= List of German women artists =

This is a list of women artists who were born in Germany or whose artworks are closely associated with that country.

== A ==
- Louise Abel (1841–1907), German-born Norwegian photographer
- Tomma Abts (born 1967), abstract painter
- Elisabeth von Adlerflycht (1775–1846), painter
- Elisabeth Ahnert (1885-1966), painter
- Anni Albers (1899–1994), German-American textile artist, printmaker
- Nykolai Aleksander (born 1978), digital artist
- Elisabeth Andrae (1876–1945), painter
- Annot (1894–1981), painter, art teacher, writer, pacifist
- Clara Arnheim (1865–1942), painter
- Ulrike Arnold (born 1950), artist
- Ursula Arnold (1929–2012), photographer
- Irene Awret (1921–2014), artist, author and Holocaust survivor
- Eva Aschoff (1900–1969), visual artist

== B ==
- Johanna Juliana Friederike Bacciarelli (1733–1809 or later), miniaturist, pastelist and court painter
- Elvira Bach (born 1951), painter
- Bele Bachem (1916–2005), graphic artist, illustrator, stage designer and writer
- Nina Lola Bachhuber (born 1971), sculptor, installation artist, artist
- Carola Baer-von Mathes (1857–1940), painter
- Alma del Banco (1862–1943), modernist painter
- Tina Bara (born 1962), photographer
- Caroline Bardua (1781–1864), painter
- Uta Barth (born 1958), photographer
- Carla Bartheel (1902–1983), actress and photographer
- Jeanna Bauck (1840–1926), painter
- Karin Baumeister-Rehm (born 1971), painter
- Mary Baumeister (1934–2023), artist
- Hilla Becher (1934–2015), photographer
- Katharina Behrend (1888–1973), photographer
- Gisela Beker (1932–2015), German-American painter
- Sibylle Bergemann (1941–2010), photographer
- Karin Baumeister-Rehm (1881–1964), painter and opera singer
- Luise Begas-Parmentier (1843–1920), painter
- Olga Beggrow-Hartmann (1862–1922), German/Russian, painter
- Julia Behr (fl.1865–1890s), portrait painter
- Amalie Bensinger (1809–1889), religious painter
- Charlotte Berend-Corinth (1880–1967), painter
- Josefa Berens-Totenohl (1891–1969), writer and painter
- Ella Bergmann-Michel (1896–1971), abstract painter, photographer, filmmaker
- Ruth Bernhard (1905–2006), German-born American photographer
- Lis Beyer (1906–1973), textile artist
- Hanna Bieber-Böhm (1851–1910), painter
- Aenne Biermann (1898–1933), photographer
- Ilse Bing (1899–1998), avant-garde photographer
- Frieda Blell (1874–1951), landscape painter
- Anna Katharina Block (1642–1719), flower painter
- Anna Blume (1937–2020), photographer
- Bärbel Bohley (1945–2010), artist, East German opposition figure
- Cosima von Bonin (born 1962), contemporary artist
- Paula Bonte (1840–1902), painter
- Madeleine Boschan (born 1979), sculptor
- Jenny Bossard-Biow (1813–c. 1858), photographer
- Pola Brändle (born 1980), collage artist
- Kerstin Brätsch (born 1979), contemporary artist
- Louise Breling (1883–1950), painter
- Marianne Breslauer (1909–2001), photographer
- Dora Bromberger (1881–1942), painter
- Theresia Anna Maria von Brühl (1784–1844), pastellist
- Hede Bühl (born 1940), sculptor
- Elisabeth Büchsel (1867–1957), painter
- Andrea Büttner (born 1972), multi-medium artist

== C ==
- Maria Caspar-Filser (1878–1968), painter
- Dorothea Chandelle (1784–1866), painter
- Suzanne Chodowiecka (1763–1819), painter
- Claricia (fl. c.1200), manuscript illuminator
- Penelope Cleyn (fl. 1668–1677), miniaturist
- Helene Cramer (1844–1916), painter
- Molly Cramer (1852–1936), painter
- Helga von Cramm (1840–1919), painter, illustrator and graphic artist
- Alice Creischer (born 1960), artist, writer and theorist

== D ==
- Anna Dabis (1847–1927), sculptor
- Hanne Darboven (1941–2009), conceptual artist
- Gabriela Dauerer (born 1958), contemporary painter
- Marie Davids (1847–1905), painter
- Wanda von Debschitz-Kunowski (1870–1935), portrait photographer
- Paula Deppe (1886–1922), painter, engraver and illustrator
- Selma Des Coudres (1883–1956), painter
- Christa Dichgans (1940–2018), painter
- Adelheid Dietrich (1827–1891), still life painter
- Minya Diez-Dührkoop (1873–1929), photographer
- Barbara Regina Dietzsch (1706–1773), painter and engraver
- Jacqueline Diffring (1920–2020), sculptor
- Christel Drillbohrer (born 1956), painter, installation artist
- Sophie Dinglinger (1736–1791), painter
- Louise Droste-Roggemann (1865–1945), painter
- Inge Druckrey (born 1940), graphic designer and educator
- Tatjana Doll (born 1970), contemporary painter
- Dr. Gindi (born 1965), sculptor
- Louise Droste-Roggemann (1865–1945), painter
- Ruth Duckworth (1919–2009), German-American sculptor and ceramist

== E ==
- Julie von Egloffstein (1792–1869), painter
- Marli Ehrman (1904–1982), German-born American textile artist
- Michaela Eichwald (born 1967), painter
- Elisabeth von Eicken (1862–1940), landscape painter
- Frauke Eigen (born 1969), photographer
- Marie Ellenrieder (1791–1863), painter
- Clara Ewald (1859–1948), painter

== F ==
- Gertrude Fehr (1895–1996), photographer
- Anke Feuchtenberger (born 1963), painter, comics artist
- Adele von Finck (1879–1943), painter
- Elsa Fraenkel (1892–1975), sculptor
- Maria Elektrine von Freyberg (1797–1847), painter
- Elsa von Freytag-Loringhoven (1874–1927), avant-garde artist, poet
- Mathilde Freiin von Freytag-Loringhoven (1860–1941), painter, writer
- Eva Frankfurther (1930–1959), painter
- Caroline Friederike Friedrich (1749–1815), flower painter
- Katharina Fritsch (born 1956), sculptor
- Helene Funke (1869–1957), painter and graphic designer

== G ==
- Edith Galliner (1914–2000), painter, potter
- Yishay Garbasz (born 1970), interdisciplinary artist
- Anna Rosina de Gasc (1713–1783), portrait painter
- Sylke von Gaza (born 1966), abstract painter
- Anna Margarethe Geiger (1783–1809), pastellist
- Senta Geißler (1902–2000), painter
- Isa Genzken (born 1948), contemporary artist
- Ida Gerhardi (1862–1927), painter
- Anna Gerresheim (1852–1921), painter, etcher
- Helga Goetze (1922–2008), embroiderer, poet, activist
- Hilde Goldschmidt (1897–1980), painter and printmaker
- Marie Goslich (1859–1936), photographer and journalist
- Sophia Goudstikker (1865–1924), Dutch-born German photographer and feminist
- Dorothea Maria Graff (1678–1743), painter
- Catrin G. Grosse (born 1964), painter, graphic designer and sculptor
- Katharina Grosse (born 1968), artist
- Rita Grosse-Ruyken (born 1948), contemporary artist
- Annelie Grund (born 1953), glass artist
- Sabina Grzimek (born 1942), sculptor
- Guda (fl. c. 1100), manuscript illuminator
- Julia Gunther (born 1979), photographer and documentary cinematographer

== H ==
- Lisel Haas (1898–1989), theatre photographer
- Ilse Häfner-Mode (1902–1973), German-Jewish artist
- Esther Haase (born 1966), photographer and film director
- Godela Habel (1929–2022), painter
- Sarah Haffner (1940–2018), German-British painter and writer
- Ilse Häfner-Mode (1902–1973), German-Jewish painter
- Julie Wilhelmine Hagen-Schwarz (1824–1902), Baltic German portrait painter from Estonia
- Marie Hager (1872–1947), painter
- Magda Hagstotz (1914–2001), abstract painter
- Henriette Hahn-Brinckmann (1862–1934), painter and lithographer
- Tina Haim-Wentscher (1887–1974), (aka Tina Haim-Wentcher), German-Australian sculptor
- Andrea Hanak (born 1969), painter
- Sandra Hastenteufel (born 1966), contemporary artist
- Iris Häussler (born 1971), German-born Canadian conceptual, installation artist
- Roswitha Hecke (born 1944), photographer
- Elise Neumann Hedinger (1854–1923), painter
- Susan Hefuna (born 1962), visual artist
- Marta Hegemann (1894–1970), avant-garde painter
- Catharina Elisabeth Heinecken (1683–1757), artist and alchemist
- Bettina Heinen-Ayech (1937–2020), painter
- Annemarie Heinrich (1912–2005), German-born Argentine photographer
- Carola Helbing-Erben, textile artist
- Amalia von Helvig (1776–1831), artist, writer, who moved to Sweden
- Ingrid Hermentin (born 1951), computer graphic artist
- Johanna Helena Herolt (1723–1868), botanical painter
- Charline von Heyl (born 1960), German-American painter
- Lotte Herrlich (1883–1956), photographer of naturism
- Eva Hesse (1936–1970), German-born American sculptor
- Vera Hilger (born 1971), painter
- Dora Hitz (1856–1924), painter
- Hannah Höch (1889–1978), avant-garde artist
- Sophie Hoechstetter (1873–1943), painter, poet
- Marta Hoepffner (1912–2000), photographer
- Candida Höfer (born 1944), photographer
- Margret Hofheinz-Döring (1910–1994), painter and graphic artist
- Bettina Hohls (born 1947), artist and designer
- Margarethe Hormuth-Kallmorgen (1857–1934), painter
- Rebecca Horn (1944–2024), installation artist
- Sabine Hornig (born 1964), photographer
- Maria Innocentia Hummel (1909–1946), nun, artist
- Irma Hünerfauth (1907–1998), painter, sculptor and object artist
- Ingeborg Hunzinger (1915–2009), sculptor
- Auguste Hüssener (1789–1877), engraver and miniaturist
- Walde Huth (1923–2011), photographer

== J ==
- Lotte Jacobi (1896–1990), German-American photographer
- Ruth Jacobsen (1932–2019), German-born American artist, collages of the Holocaust
- Hedwig Jarke (1882–1949), printmaker
- Marie Jensen (1845–1921), painter
- Charlotte Joël (1887–1943), photographer
- Ilse Jonas (1884–1922), painter
- Brigitte Jurack (born 1962), sculptor
- Tina Juretzek (born 1952), painter

== K ==
- Amalie Kärcher (1819–1887), fruit and flower painter
- Henriette Agnete Kitty von Kaulbach (1900–1992), German-Dutch painter
- Johanna Keimeyer (born 1982), photographer, artist
- Maria Countess von Kalckreuth (1857–1897), painter
- Annette Kelm (born 1975), contemporary artist, photographer
- Marie von Keudell (1838–1918), painter
- Inge King (1915–2016), German-born Australian sculptor
- Astrid Kirchner (1938–2020), photographer, artist
- Mary Louisa Kirschner (1852–1931), painter, glass artist
- Johanna Kirsch (1856–1907), painter
- Anna Klein (1883–1941), painter
- Barbara Klemm (born 1939), press photographer
- Gabriele Koch (born 1948), studio potter
- Dora Koch-Stetter (1881–1968), (aka Dora Stetter), landscape artist, portrait painter and etcher
- Käthe Kollwitz (1867–1945), painter, printmaker
- Katrin Korfmann (born 1971), contemporary artist
- Emma Körner (1788–1815), painter
- Marianne Kraus (1765–1838), painter, travel writer
- Susanne Kriemann (born 1972), artist, photographer
- Magda Kröner (1854–1935), painter
- Monika Kropshofer (born 1952), photographer
- Christiane Kubrick (born 1932), actress, dancer, painter and singer
- Germaine Krull (1897–1985), photographer, activist
- Marianne Kühn (1914–2005), politician and painter
- Susanne Kühn (born 1969), painter
- Marie Kundt (1870–1932), photographer and educator
- Marianne Kürzinger (1767–1809), history and genre painter
- Barbara Kussinger (born 1970), painter

== L ==
- Lotte Laserstein (1898–1993), German-Swedish painter
- Eva Ursula Lange (1928–2020), German painter, illustrator, graphic designer, and ceramist
- Henni Lehmann (1862–1937), painter
- Hildegard Lehnert (1857–1943), painter
- Margaret Leiteritz (1907–1976), painter
- Erna Lendvai-Dircksen (1883–1962), photographer
- Sabine Lepsius (1864–1942), portrait painter
- Esther Levine (born 1970), German-American photographer
- Sophie Ley (1849–1918), painter
- Emmy Lischke (1860–1919), painter
- Clara Lobedan (1840–1918), painter
- Elisabeth Loewe (1924–1996), Post-Expressionist painter
- Käthe Loewenthal (1878–1942), painter
- Christiane Löhr (born 1965), contemporary artist
- Elfriede Lohse-Wächtler (1899–1940), avant-garde artist
- Margarethe Loewe-Bethe (1859–1932), painter
- Käthe Loewenthal (1878–1942), painter
- Louise Hollandine of the Palatinate (1622–1709), painter and abbess
- Auguste Ludwig (1834–1901), painter
- Almuth Lütkenhaus (1930–1996), sculptor
- Loretta Lux (born 1969), photographer
- Rut Blees Luxemburg (born 1967), photographer
- Vilma Lwoff-Parlaghy (1863–1923), painter

== M ==
- Hilke MacIntyre, contemporary ceramist
- Dorothea Maetzel-Johannsen (1886–1930), portrait painter
- Ida Maier-Müller (1821–1904) landscape painter and self-portraitist
- Eva de Maizière (1915–2003), artist, sculptor and cellist
- Melanie Manchot (born 1966), photographer and installation artist
- Jeanne Mandello (1907–2001), photographer
- Henriette Manigk (born 1968), painter
- Maria Marc (1876–1953), painter, textile artist
- Hedwig Marquardt (1884–1969), ceramist and painter
- Therese Maron (1725–1806), painter
- Ellen Marx (born 1939), artist and author
- Toni Mau (1917–1981), painter, graphic artist and educator
- Susanna Mayr (1600–1674), Baroque painter
- Josephine Meckseper (fl. 1990s), contemporary artist
- Ada Mee (born 1946), multi-media artist
- Else Meidner (1901–1987), painter
- Anna Maria Mengs (1751–1792), painter
- Julia Charlotte Mengs (c.1730–c.1806), painter
- Anne Menke (born 1967), German-American photographer
- Adelheid Mers (born 1960), multi-disciplinary artist
- Alice Michaelis (1875–1943) painter, educator
- Immeke Mitscherlich (1899–1985), textile artist
- Paula Modersohn-Becker (1876–1907), Expressionist painter
- Una H. Moehrke (born 1953), painter
- Marg Moll (1884–1977), sculptor, painter and writer
- Sabine Moritz (born 1969), painter and graphic designer
- Hedda Morrison (1908–1991), photographer
- Auguste Müller (1847–1930), woodcarver, toymaker
- Karin Apollonia Müller (born 1963), contemporary artist
- Gabriele Münter (1877–1962), Expressionist painter

== N ==
- Susanne von Nathusius (1850–1929), portrait painter
- Renee Nele (born 1932), sculptor, goldsmith
- Elisabet Ney (1833–1907), sculptor
- Anja Niedringhaus (1965–2014), photojournalist
- Margret Nissen (born 1938), photographer
- Elisabeth Noltenius (1888–1964), painter
- Maria Nordman (born 1943), German-American sculptor, conceptual artist

== O ==
- Frédérique Émilie Auguste O'Connell (1823–1885), painter
- Elsa Oeltjen-Kasimir (1887–1944), German sculptor, painter, and graphic artist
- Méret Oppenheim (1913–1985), German-born Swiss Surrealist artist, photographer
- Hildegard Ochse (1935–1997), photographer
- Li Osborne (1883–1968), German-born British photographer and sculptor
- Anna Kerstin Otto (born 1972), painter
- Justine Otto (born 1974), painter
- Hermine Overbeck-Rohte (1869–1937), landscape painter

== P ==
- Cornelia Paczka-Wagner (1864–after 1930), painter
- Amalia Pachelbel (1688–1723), painter and engraver
- Louise Pagenkopf (1856–1922), landscape painter
- Margarete Palz (born 1937), textile artist
- Jeannette Papin (1761–1835), painter
- Helga Paris (1938–2024), photographer
- Lina von Perbandt (1836–1884), landscape painter
- Anna Peters (1843–1926), landscape and flower painter
- Lilo Peters (1913–2001), painter and sculptor
- Pietronella Peters (1848–1924), portrait painter
- Carlotta Ida Popert (1848–1923), German-Italian watercolourist, etcher
- Charlotte Posenenske (1930–1985), sculptor
- Bettina Pousttchi (born 1971), German-Iranian sculptor, photographer, filmmaker
- Maria Katharina Prestel (1747–1794), painter, etcher
- Hermione von Preuschen (1854–1918), painter, writer
- Emilie Preyer (1849–1930), painter
- Barbara Probst (born 1964), German-American photographer
- Anne-Katrin Purkiss (born 1959), photographer
- Doramaria Purschian (1890–1972), Expressionist painter
- Karin Putsch-Grassi (born 1960), potter

== R ==
- Doris Raab (1851–1933), print-maker
- Erna Raabe (1882–1938), painter
- Dorothee Raetsch (born 1940), sculptor, graphic artist
- Katja Rahlwes (born 1967), fashion photographer
- Katharina Rapp (born 1948), painter
- Sandra Rauch (born 1967), painter
- Hilla von Rebay (1890–1967), abstract artist, co-founder of the Guggenheim Museum
- Anita Rée (1885–1933), avant-garde painter
- Margaretha Reichardt (1907–1984), textile designer and former Bauhaus student
- Margarethe von Reinken (1877–1962), painter
- Claudia Reinhardt (born 1964), photographer
- Christophine Reinwald (1757–1847), painter
- Regina Relang (1906–1989), fashion photographer
- Jack von Reppert-Bismarck (1903–1971), painter
- Elisabeth Reuter (1853–1903), painter
- Ottilie Reylaender (1882–1965), painter
- Evelyn Richter (1930–2021), photographer
- Ursula Richter (1886–1946), theatre photographer
- Frieda Riess (1890–c. 1955), portrait photographer
- Adele Röder (born 1980), painter
- Emy Roeder (1890–1971), sculptor
- Ottilie Roederstein (1859–1937), painter
- Rita Rohlfing (born 1964), painter, photographer and installation artist
- Tata Ronkholz (1940–1997), photographer
- Jelka Rosen (1868–1935), painter
- Ulla Irina Rossek (born 1978), painter
- Valeska Röver (1849–1931), painter
- Julika Rudelius (born 1968), video and performance artist

== S ==
- Lessie Sachs (1897–1942), poet and artist
- Adelaïde Salles-Wagner (1825–1890), painter active in France
- Charlotte Salomon (1917–1943), painter
- Christa Sammler (born 1932), sculptor
- Eva Sandberg-Xiao (1911–2001), photographer
- Agnes Sander-Plump (1888–1980), painter
- Amalia von Schattenhofer (1763–1840), art collector and amateur painter
- Silke Schatz (born 1967), sculptor, installation artist
- Auguste Schepp (1846–1905), painter
- Galka Scheyer (1889–1945), German-American painter, art collector and teacher
- Ingrid Schmeck (born 1944), graphic artist
- Gerda Schmidt-Panknin (1920–2021), painter
- Julia Schmidt (born 1976), painter
- Thyra Schmidt (born 1974), visual artist
- Henriette Schneider (1747–1812), painter
- Sophie Schneider (1866–1942), painter
- Stefanie Schneider (born 1968), photographer
- Doris Schoettler-Boll (1945–2015), artist, curator and teacher
- Eva Schorr (1927–2016), painter and composer
- Caroline Friederike von Schlözer (1753–1808) painter, embroiderer
- Bertha Schrader (1845–1920), painter
- Martina Schradi (born 1972), writer, cartoonist
- Liselotte Schramm-Heckmann (1904–1995), painter
- Käthe Schuftan (1899–1958), painter and drafter
- Anna Schuleit Haber (born 1974), visual artist
- Ursula Schulz-Dornburg (born 1938), photographer
- Martina Schumacher (born 1972), conceptual artist
- Eva Schulze-Knabe (1907–1976), painter and graphic artist, resistance fighter
- Regine Schumann (born 1961), contemporary painter and installation artist
- Else Seifert (1879–1968), architectural photographer
- Else Sehrig-Vehling (1897–1994), Expressionist painter
- Louise Seidler (1786–1866), painter, custodian
- Friederike Sieburg (1761–1835), pastellist
- Alma Siedhoff-Buscher (1899–1944), designer
- Katharina Sieverding (born 1944), photographer
- Pola Sieverding (born 1981), photographer and video artist
- Clara Siewert (1862–1945), Symbolist painter
- Ludovike Simanowiz (1759–1827), portrait painter
- Zuzanna Skiba (born 1968), painter
- Maria Slavona (1865–1931), Impressionist painter
- Kiki Smith (born 1954), West German-born American sculptor, printmaker, drawer
- Annegret Soltau (born 1946), visual artist
- Margarethe Sömmering (1768–1802), painter
- Kathrin Sonntag (born 1981), visual artist
- Catharina Sperling-Heckel (1699–1741), painter and etcher
- Gertrud Staats (1859–1938), painter
- Pia Stadthäuser (born 1959), sculptor
- Jonny Star (born 1964), sculptor, installation artist
- Birgit Stauch (born 1961), contemporary sculptor
- Marél von Steinling (born 1933), painter
- Hito Steyerl (born 1966), filmmaker, visual artist and writer
- Dora Stock (1760–1832), painter
- Minna Stocks (1846–1928), painter
- Gunta Stölzl (1897–1983), textile artist
- Madeleine Strindberg (born 1955), painter
- Helene Marie Stromeyer (1834–1924), painter
- Erika Stürmer-Alex (born 1938), painter
- Johanna Dorothea Sysang (1729-1791), engraver

== T ==
- Gerda Taro (1910–1937), war photographer
- Henriette-Félicité Tassaert (1766–1818), painter
- Ebba Tesdorpf (1851–1920), illustrator and painter
- Anna Dorothea Therbusch (1721–1782), Rococo painter
- Ulrike Theusner (born 1982), printmaker
- Elsa Thiemann (1910–1981), photographer
- Amalie Tischbein (1757–1839), painter and etcher
- Elisabeth Treskow (1898–1992), goldsmith
- Catharina Treu (1743–1811), still life painter
- Rosemarie Trockel (born 1952), contemporary artist
- Alice Trübner (1875–1916), painter
- Susanne Tunn (born 1958), sculptor

== U ==
- Ellen von Unwerth (born 1954), photographer

== V ==
- Lette Valeska (1885–1985), painter
- Jutta Vialon (1917–2004), photographer
- Clara Vogedes (1892–1983), painter
- Christa Frieda Vogel (born 1960), photographer

== W ==
- Grete Waldau (born 1868), architectural painter, mural artist
- Emmi Walther (1860–1936), painter
- Maria Dorothea Wagner (1719–1792), painter
- Corinne Wasmuht (born 1964), painter
- Bertha Wehnert-Beckmann (1815–1901), Germany's first professional female photographer with a studio in Leipzig from 1843
- Hanna Weil (1921–2011), painter
- Gisela Weimann (born 1943), visual artist, feminist
- Kaethe Katrin Wenzel (born 1972), contemporary artist
- Anna Maria Werner (1688–1753), painter
- Anna Werner (born 1941), photographer
- Clara Westhoff (1878–1954), sculptor
- Brigitta Westphal (born 1944), painter
- Marianne Wex (born 1937), feminist photographer
- Eva Janina Wieczorek (born 1951), painter
- Therese Emilie Henriette Winkel (1784-1867) - painter, author, composer
- Anne Winterer (1894–1938), photographer
- Lilli Wislicenus (1872–1939), sculptor
- Herma Auguste Wittstock (born 1977), performance artist
- Karla Woisnitza (born 1952), fresco painter
- Ursula Wolff Schneider (1906–1977), photographer and photojournalist
- Julie Wolfthorn (1864–1944), painter
- Emmy Worringer (1878–1961), avant-garde artist

== Y ==
- Barbara Yelin (born 1977), cartoonist
- Yva (1900–1944), Jewish photographer

== Z ==
- Wilhelmine von Zenge (1780–1852), pastellist
- Thekla Zielke (born 1928), ceramic artist
- Margaretha Ziesenis (born c. 1740s), miniaturist
- Dorothea Schwartz Zimmer (fl. 1800), portrait painter
- Unica Zürn (1916–1970), artist and writer
- Bettina von Zwehl (born 1971), photographer

== See also ==
- List of German women photographers
