= Tatjana Doll =

German painter

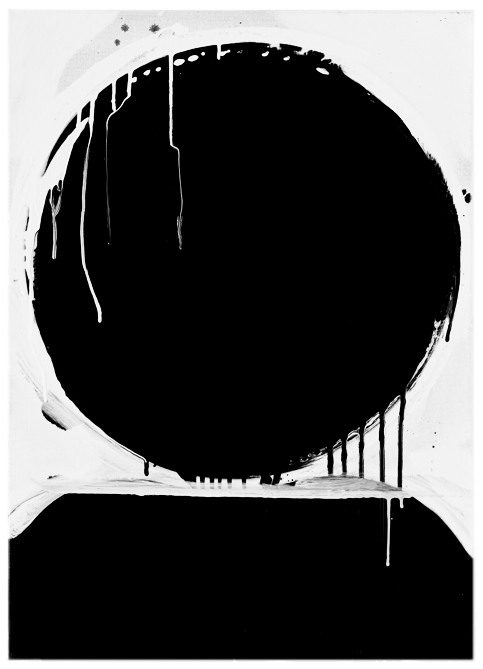
Tatjana Doll, 20 PICT Theodor, 2010

Tatjana Doll (born 1970 in Burgsteinfurt) is a contemporary German painter.

== Life ==
Doll studied at Kunstakademie Düsseldorf under the master Dieter Krieg. In 2009 she was appointed as art professor at the State Academy of Fine Arts Karlsruhe.

== Artistic work ==
Doll's pictures often show diverse everyday objects, which structure and influence our lives in the way we are often not aware of. Cardboard cups, suitcases, electronic devices, lorries or cars are depicted in large, realistic paintings and are subjects to a detailed analysis by the means of art. The focus on a single object allows taking a distance from the automatic way of seeing it, to look at it from a different point of view and to recognize social and political contexts behind it. "Doll's painting begins with social reality as well as with the question of images and symbols to represent the processes of this reality and their subjective assimilation.".

=== Technique and material ===
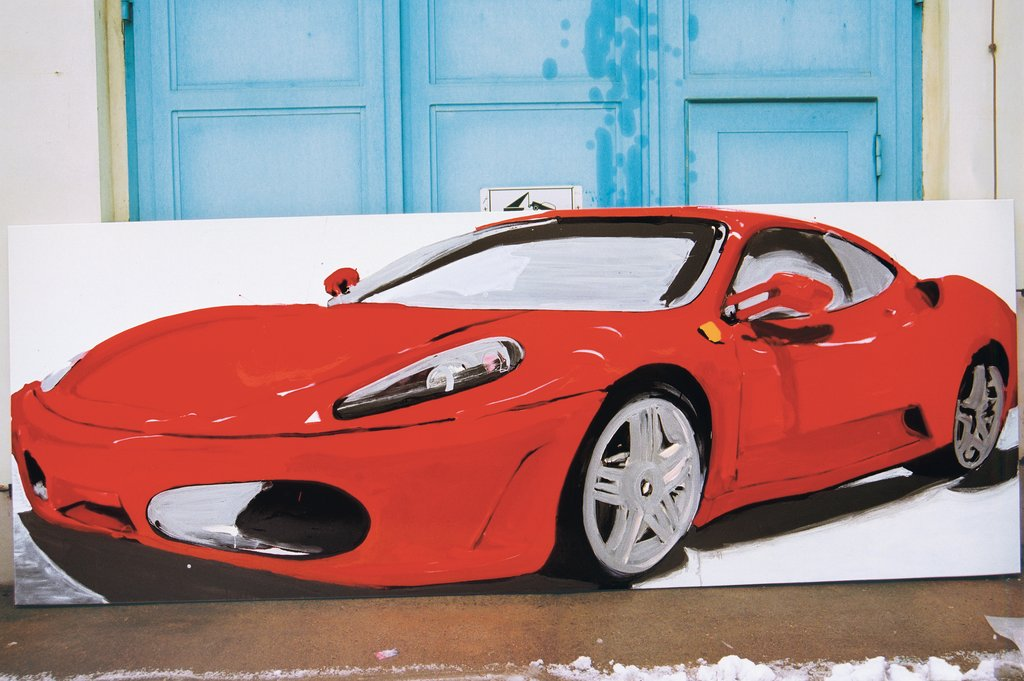
Tatjana Doll, Ferrari F430, 2005

In her works, Tatjana Doll investigates the possibilities and the borders of painting as well as "its potential to disclose social processes and our perception of them". The predominantly realistic style appears even stronger due to the oversized formats. The artist often works with the same motive across a series of pictures and therefore lets the moment of accident integrate the pictorial interplay. Tatjana Doll finds the way to express the confrontation of perfection and failure, integrity and breach. The material plays a great role – the artist works with enamel, the shiny surface of which frequently gets cracks, paint puddles, and waves.

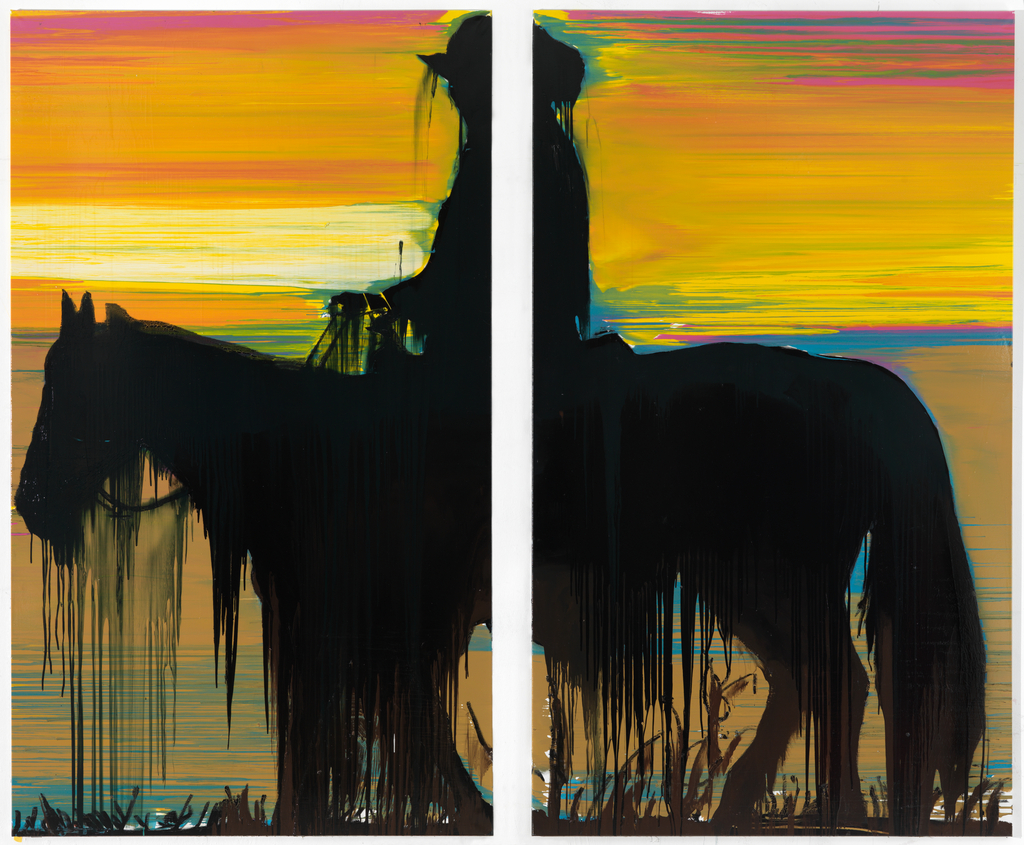
Tatjana Doll, AD Fe Real, 2010

== See also ==
- List of German women artists
