= Nina Lola Bachhuber =

German contemporary artist

- Born: Nina Lola Bachhuber; Munich, Germany
- Known for: drawing, sculpture, installation art

Nina Lola Bachhuber (born 1971) is a German contemporary artist working in the realm of sculpture, installation art and drawing.

Nina Lola Bachhuber was born in Munich, Germany, and obtained her Masters of Fine Arts at the Hochschule für bildende Künste Hamburg. Bachhuber has exhibited her work widely, e.g. at UCLA Hammer Museum, The Drawing Center, P.S.1 Contemporary Art Center, Sculpture Center, Metro Pictures and Mary Boone Galleries in New York, The Moore Space in Miami, Von der Heydt-Museum, Wuppertal, Germany, Gallery Min Min in Tokyo and the Städtische Galerie im ZKM, Karlsruhe, Germany.

Her work is the collection of the Museum of Modern Art, New York.

== See also ==
- List of German women artists
