= Adelheid Dietrich =

German painter

- Born: 1827; Wittenberg, Germany
- Died: 1891 (aged 63–64)
- Known for: Painting

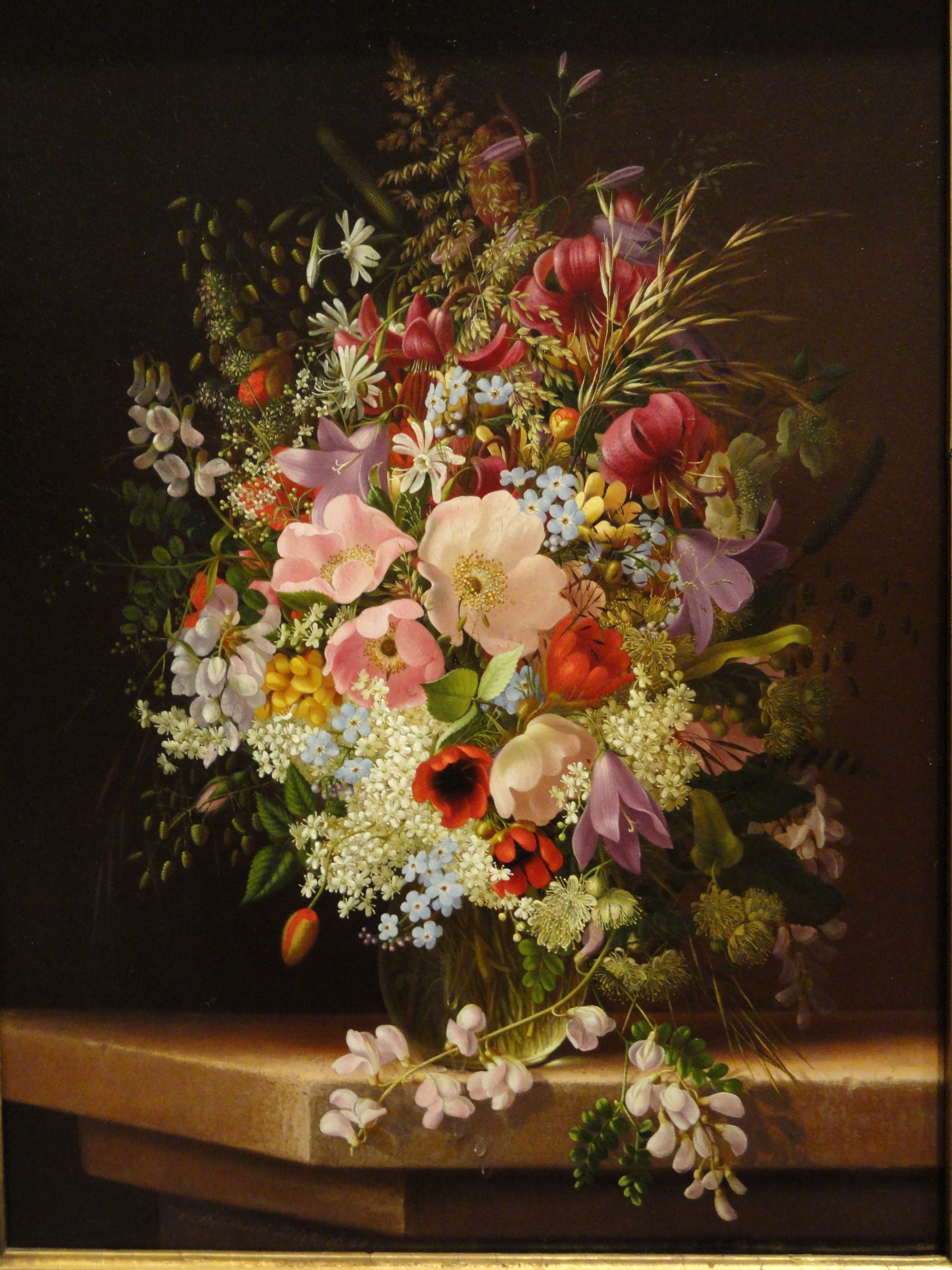
Still Life of Flowers by Adelheid Dietrich, 1868

Adelheid Dietrich (1827–1891) was a German still life painter and daughter of painter Eduard Dietrich (1803–1877).

== Life ==
Dietrich was born in Wittenberg, Germany, and painted flowers in fine detail in a manner resembling that of seventeenth-century Dutch still-life painters.

About fifty of her works are known today. Her work is held in the National Gallery of Art.

=== Works ===
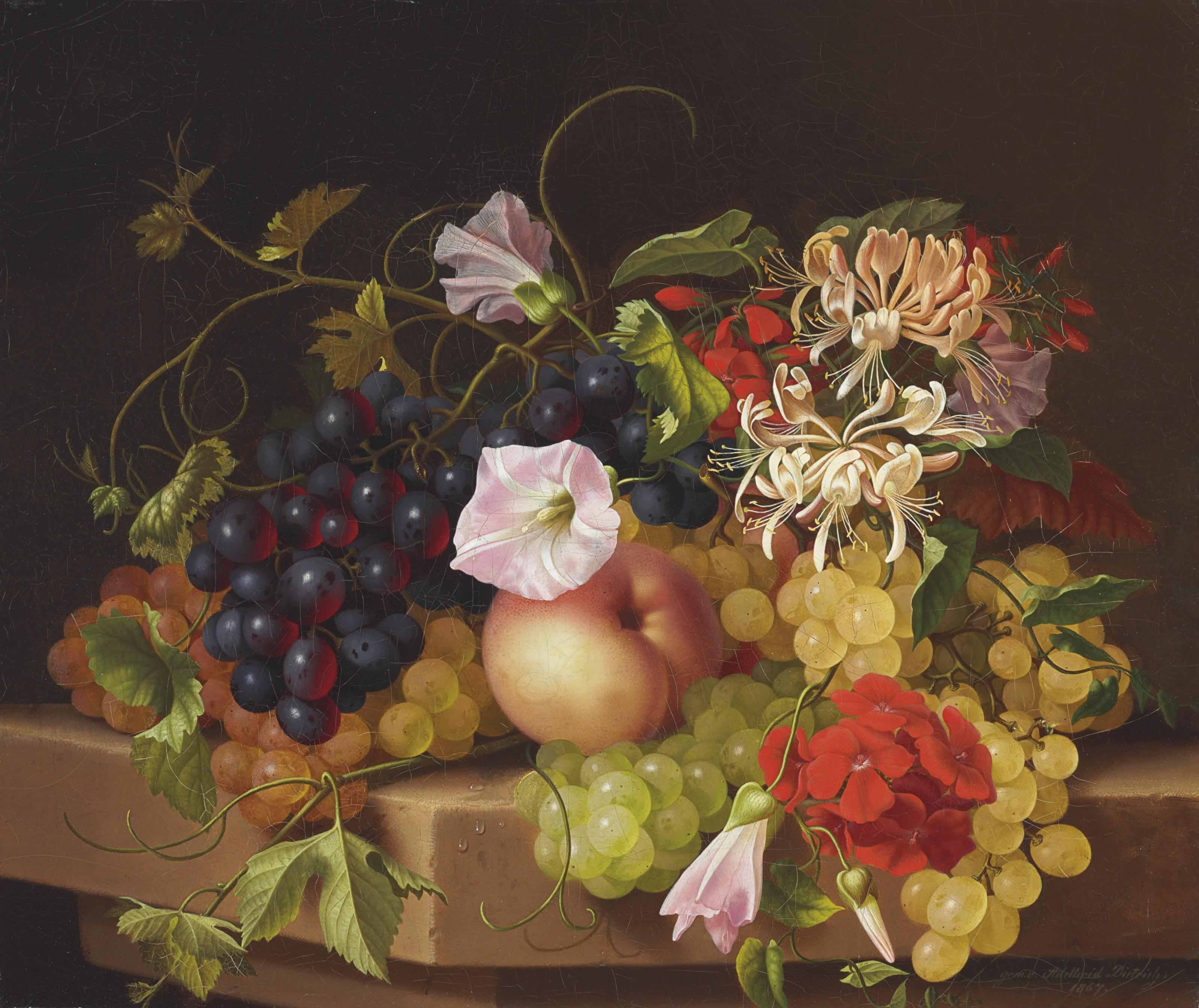
Still Life of Flowers

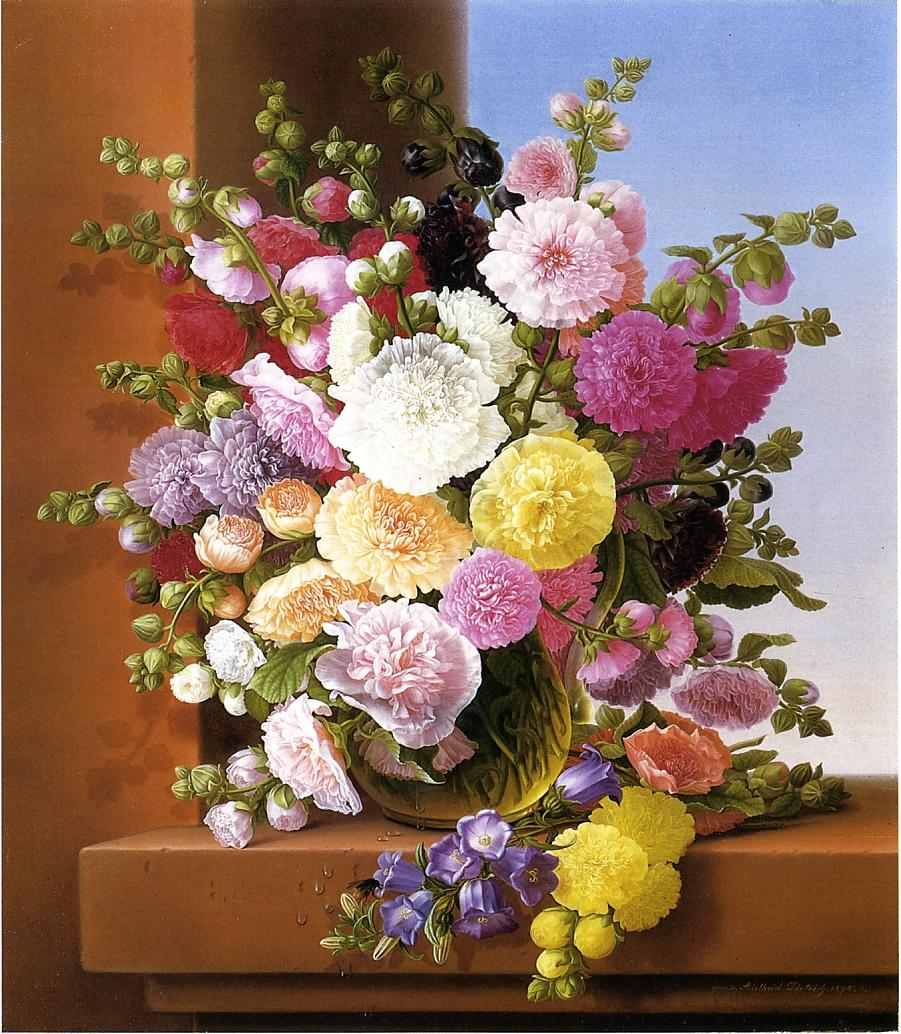
Still Life of Flowers

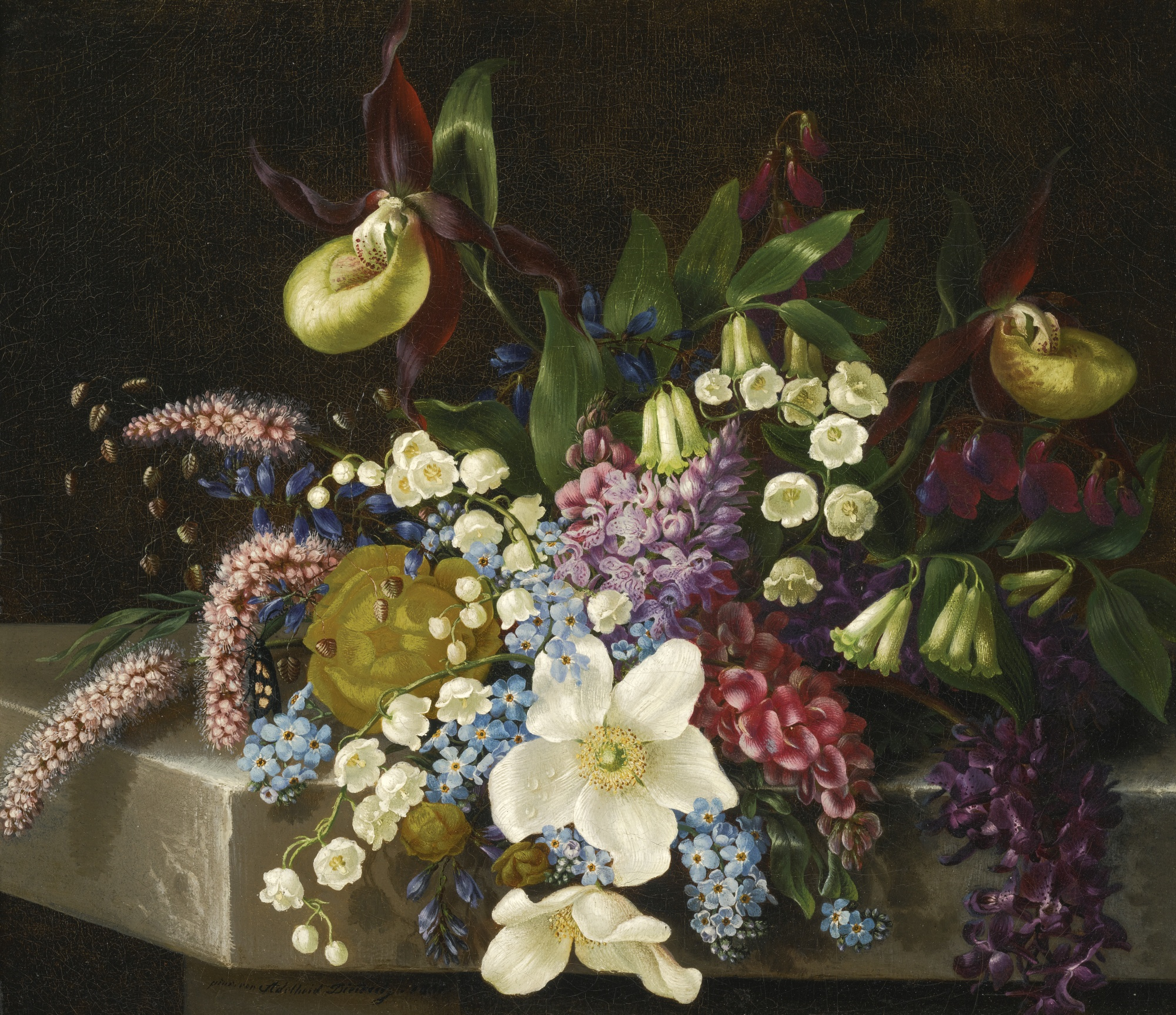
Still Life of Flowers

== See also ==
- List of German women artists
