= Cornelia Paczka-Wagner =

German artist

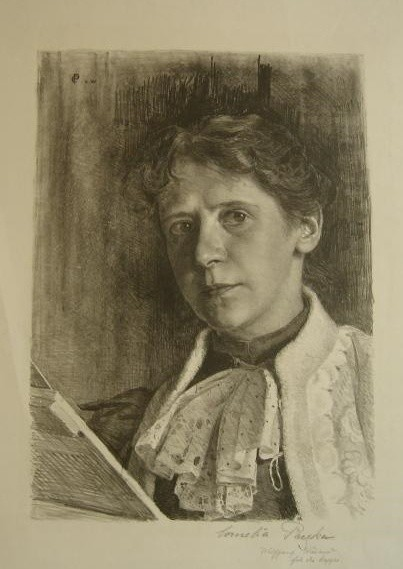
- Self-Portrait, circa 1898, The Jack Daulton Collection
- Born: 9 August 1864; Göttingen, Kingdom of Hanover
- Died: after 1930
- Known for: Painting
- Spouse: Ferenc Paczka

Cornelia Paczka-Wagner' (1864-after 1930) was a German artist.

== Biography ==
Paczka-Wagner née Wagner was born on 9 August 1864 in Göttingen. She attended the Königliche Akademie der Bildenden Kunste (Academy of Fine Arts, Munich) and studied with Karl Stauffer-Bern. She traveled to Rome to continue her studies, and there she met the Hungarian painter Ferenc Paczka, whom she married in Rome in 1890. The couple settled in Berlin. Paczka-Wagner won a bronze medal at the Paris Exposition Universelle (1889).

Sources do not have an exact date of death for Paczka-Wagner. It is stated as either "1930" or "after 1930". The Deutsche Biographie lists her death date as 1943.

== Gallery ==
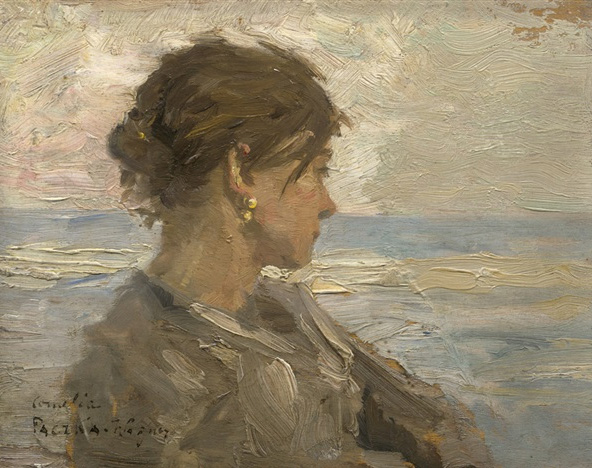
Young Woman by the Sea The Jack Daulton Collection, Los Altos Hills, California

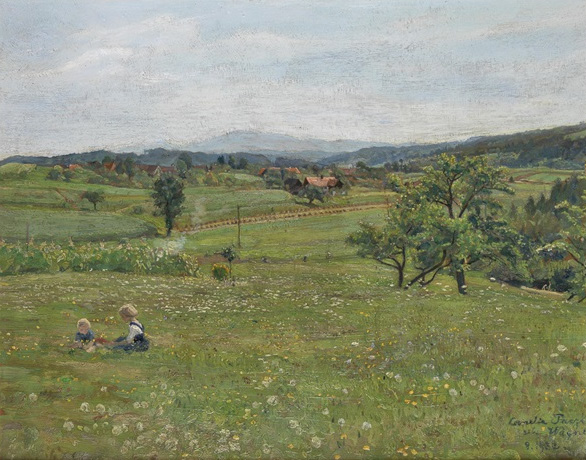
Children playing on a summer meadow

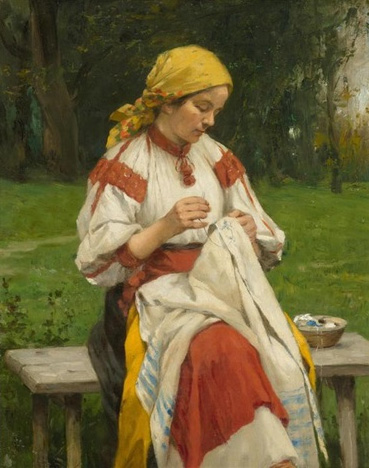
Woman embroidering
