= Hedwig Jarke =

German artist

- Born: 1882; Berlin, Germany
- Died: 1949 (aged 66–67); Starnberg, Germany
- Known for: Painting, Printmaking

Hedwig Jarke (1882–1949) was a German artist.

== Biography ==
Jarke was born in 1882 in Berlin. She died in 1949 in Starnberg. Her work is in the collection of the Städtisches Kunstmuseum Spendhaus Reutlingen (Municipal Art Museum, Spendhaus Reutlingen) and the Minneapolis Institute of Art.

== Gallery ==
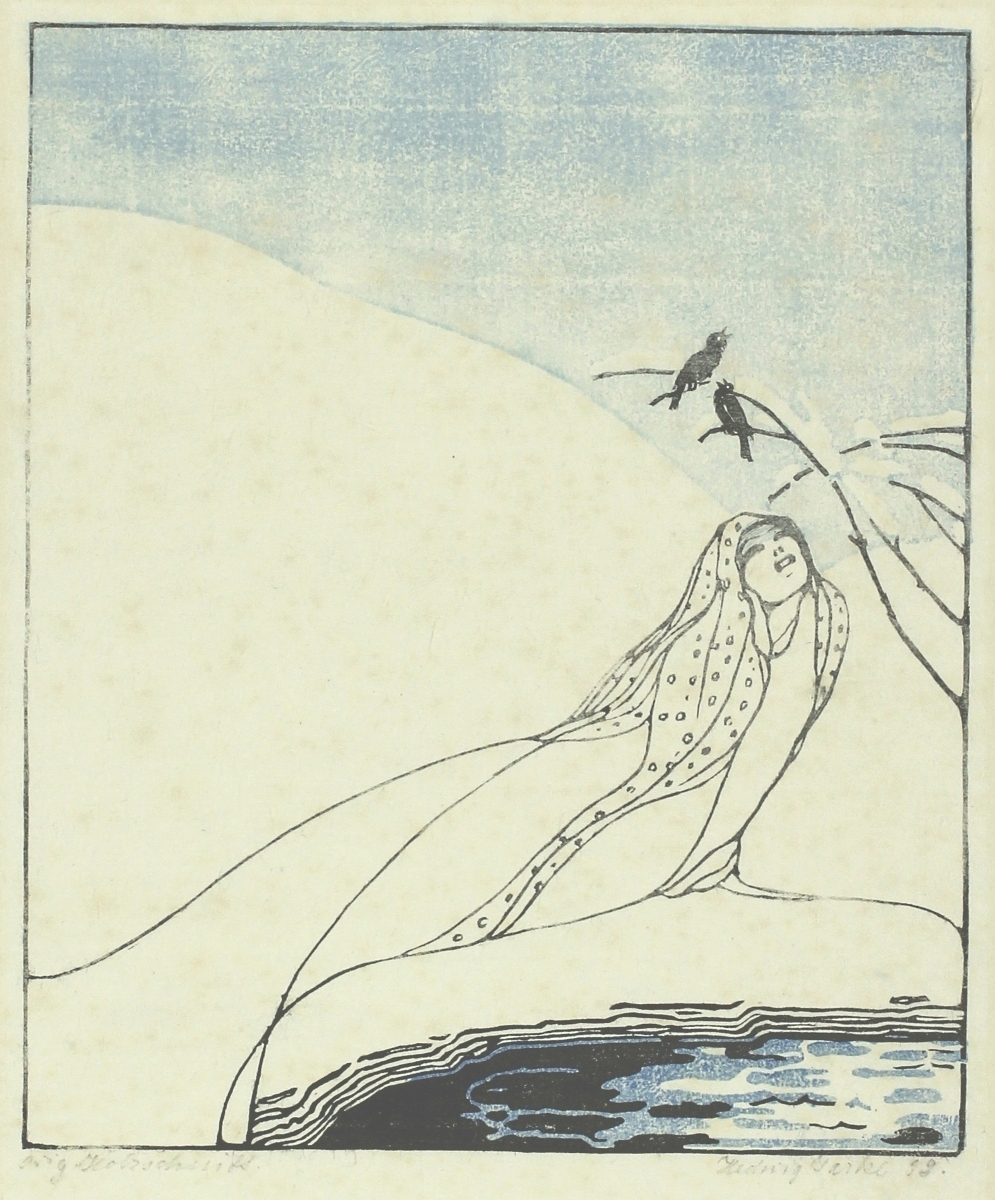
Fantasy Figure and Two Birds, color woodcut

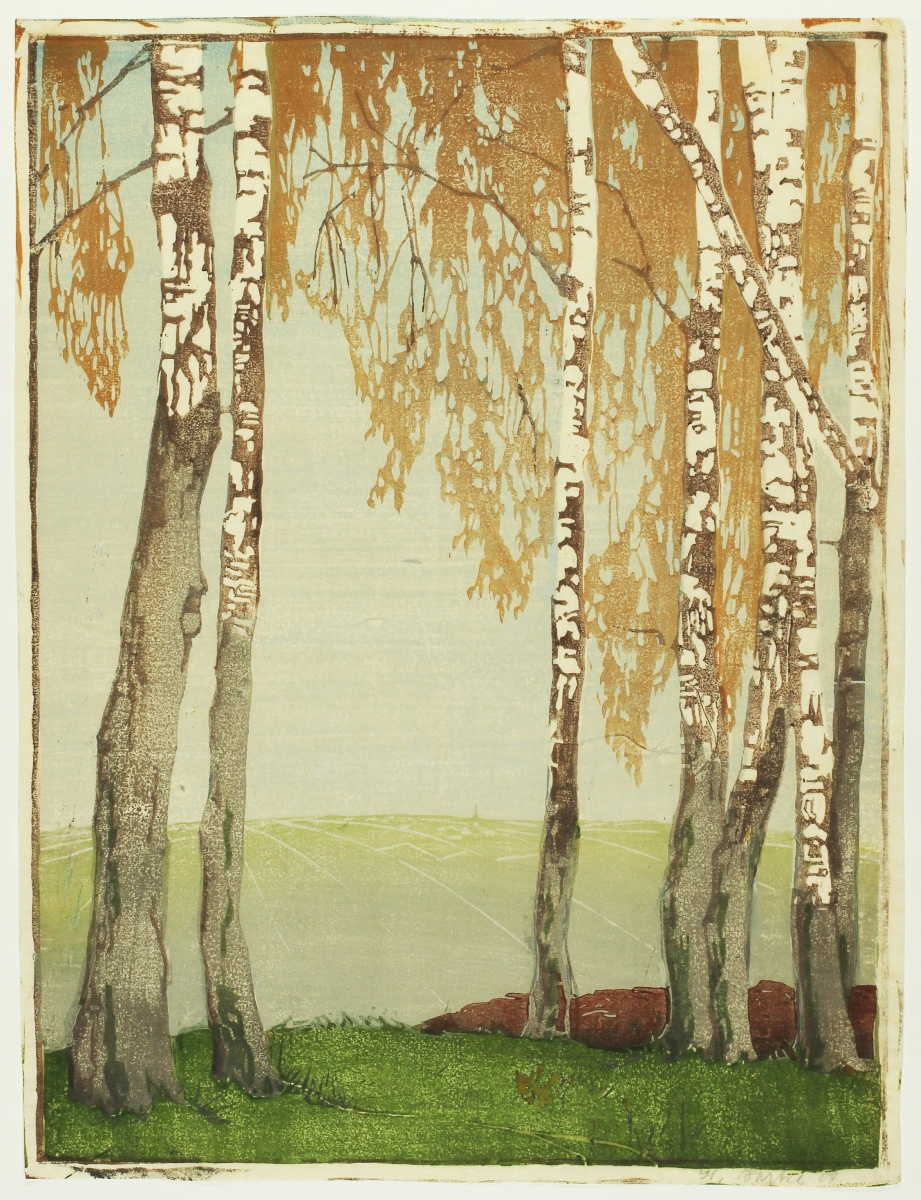
Birches, color woodcut

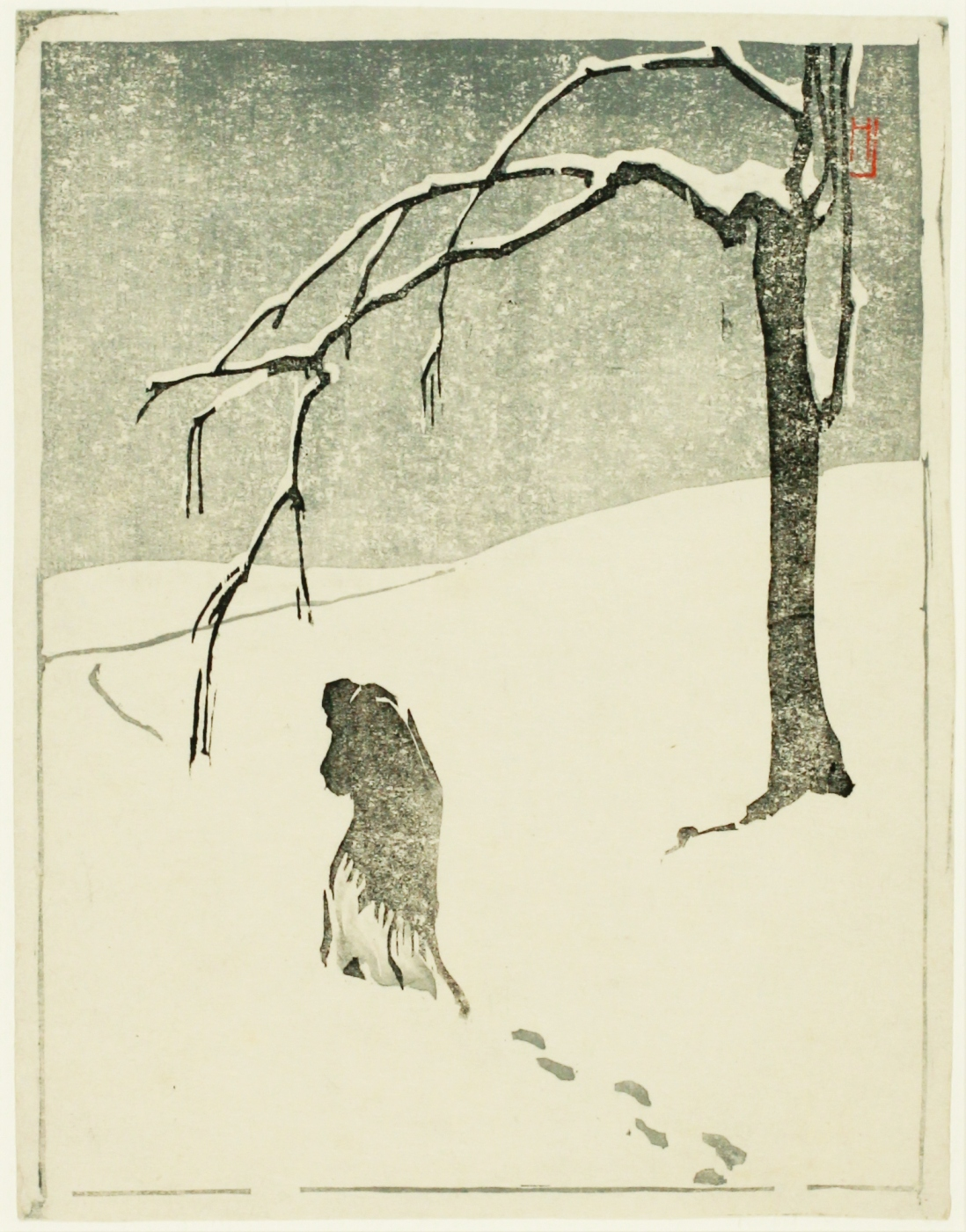
Winter, color woodcut
