= Eva Janina Wieczorek =

German painter

Eva Janina Wieczorek (born 23 May 1951) in Katowice in Poland. She is a visual artist. She is a Polish-German painter, a draftsman and sculptor. She is an artist whose works were shown in prices, publications, collections and exhibitions in Germany, Great Britain, Croatia, Poland and Belgium. Your work is characterized by a powerful implementation of light and shadow and deal with current topics in our world. Many of their works are attributed to realism and surrealism. She lives and works in Brühl, Germany.

== Biography ==
In Poland she finished an apprenticeship as a technician. When she was young she was interested in painting, and her uncle, who was a painter, brought her in contact with the fine arts. The artist studied privately free art in the field of painting with Prof. Roman Kalarus at the Academy of Fine Arts ASP in Katowice Poland. Starting with watercolours and acrylic paint she now works with oil on canvas paintings and Digital Drawings.

== Digital paintings ==
Since 2010, the artist has also turned to digital painting, inspired by David Hockney’s digital works. Even earlier, she was fascinated by the possibility of creating images using graphic software. This book provides a unique insight into Eva Janina Wieczorek’s versatility as a painter and illustrator in digital art. Her work encompasses a constant search for new forms of expression, as well as experimentation with the portrayal of women and children. Her keen sense of interpersonal relationships and interest in current fashion are also evident in numerous portraits, including those of well-known actors and singers such as Michael Jackson, Marilyn Monroe, and Whitney Houston. Additionally, she has created landscapes and underwater images, including works titled “Abgetaucht 1 and 2", “Botschaft” and “Schwimmbad”. Initially, she created her works with the help of templates or sketches on the screen. Nowadays, her pieces emerge spontaneously from mental images, often organized into color-themed series, resulting in over a hundred works.

== Exhibitions ==
- 2005 Brühl Germany, "Wintertraum", Rathausgalerie, Single Exhibition
- 2007 Brühl Germany, "Architektonische Aussichten", Orangerie Schloss Augustusburg, Single Exhibition
- 2008 Katowice Poland, "Woda, podróż i sen", Silesian Museum Katowice Poland, Single Exhibition
- 2009 Meisterschwanden Swiss, Kunst Portal International
- 2010 Brussels Belgium, Art Contemporary Gallery Croissant, Studio d.v.o
- 2010 Punat Croatia, Gallery Tos, Single Exhibition
- 2011 London, Great Britain, Parallax Art Fair, La Galleria Pall Mall, Royal Opera Arcade,
- 2011 Marl, Germany, Marler Kunststern 2011,
- 2014 Marl, Germany, Marler Kunststern 2014,
- 2015 Brühl Germany, "Schattenimpressionen", Rathausgalerie, Single Exhibition
- 2015 Brühl Germany, "Because I am a Girl", Rathausgalerie
- 2016: Art fair contemporary art, PAN Museum Niederrhein, Emmerich
- 2017: Brühl Germany, "Dream and reality", Rathausgalerie, Emmerich
- 2017: Artist of the Year 2017, Internetgalerie, Airleben.de
- 2019: Open studio from Eva Janina Wieczorek day in Brühl
- 2021: Open studio from Eva Janina Wieczorek day in Brühl
- 2023: Open Studio from Eva Janina Wieczorek day in Brühl

== Famous Works ==
- Aleppo, 2016, acrylic on canvas, 40x60 cm
- Rest Area, 2006, oil on canvas, 50x60 cm, in the collection of the Silesian Museum in Katowice
- Silence, 2006, acrylic on canvas, 100x80 cm, in the collection of the Silesian Museum in Katowice
- Olive Tree, 2009, oil on canvas, 50x60 cm, in the City of Brühl Collection

== Paintings in public possession ==
- Silesian Museum, Katowice Poland (polish)
- Brühl (Rhineland], Germany

== Literature ==
- Catalog of the exhibition at National Library of Poland ISBN 978-83-60353-64-6 (polish; German)
- "Brühler Fragebogen .... mit Eva Wieczorek". Brühler Fragebogen.
- Maria Fiderkiewicz: Wasser, Reise und Traum. Malerei von Eva Wieczorek / Woda, podróż i sen - Malarstwo Evy Wieczorek. Muzeum Slaskie, Katowice Poland 2008, ISBN 978-83-60353-64-6.
- Łukasz Kałębasiak, Eva Wieczorek: Artystka z licencją na malowanie". Magazine: "Gazeta Wyborcza", Katowice Poland, 7 April 2007
- Britta Havlicek, "Zwischen Mensch und Natur". Magazine: "Kölner Stadt Anzeiger" "Rhein Erft", Cologne Germany. Nr.38, 24 April 2007
- Harald Zeyen, "Bilder mit Realismus und Elementen des Surrealismus. Magazine "Brühler Schlossbote", Brühl Germany 25. April 2007
- Tobias Gonszerowski: Brühler Fragebogen... mit Eva Wieczorek. Journal: "Brühler Fragenbogen", Brühl Germany Nr. 250, April 2008
- Harald Zeyen, "Lichtblicke in der Orangerie". Magazine: "Brühler Schlossbote", Brühl Germany 22. April 2009
- Claudia Grosse: Ein Spiel mit Licht und Schatten. Journal: "Kölner Stadt Anzeiger" . Colonia Germany. Nr. 91, 20. April 2009
- Hanna Styrie: Das Spiel von Licht und Schatten. Journal: Kölnische Rundschau, Colonia Germany. Nr. 91, 20. April 2009
- Prof. Jasna Rodin: Samostalna izložba Eve Wieczorek. Catalog from Gallery Toš, Verlag: Corngraf d.o.o Umag, Punat Croatia. 18.June 2010
- Harald Zeyen, "Spiel mit dem Schatten". Magazine "Brühler Schlossbote". 17. February 2015
- Gabi Ignor, "Eva Wieczorek Schattenimpressionen" Magazine "InBrühl" Der Veranstaltungs- und Tourismus Kalender, Nr. 64 January–March 2015
- Colleen Boyett, H. Micheal Tarver, Mildred Diane Gleason: „Daily Life of Women“, Bloomsbury Publishing USA, ISBN 1440846936, ISBN 9781440846939, 7. Dezember 2020

== Grants ==
- 2008: Silesian Museum, ( Solo Exhibition: Woda, podróż i sen), Curator: Maria Fiderkiewicz
- 2011: Art prize Marler Kunststern 2011
- 2014: Art prize Marler Kunststern 2014
- 2017: Artist of the Year 2017, nominated, Internetgalerie, Airleben.de
