= Senta Geißler =

German painter (1902–2000)

Senta Geißler (24 July 1902 – 19 October 2000) was a German painter. Despite her gender, in 1919 she enrolled at the Academy of Fine Arts in Karlsruhe. She was one of the first women to be permitted to do this.

== Youth and training ==
Maria Zentia "Senta" Geißler was born in Heidelberg where her father held a senior position with the Schroedl Brewery. She had a brother who died when only a few months old, with the result that she benefitted from all the very considerable parental and family support that might otherwise have been devoted to (or at least shared with) her brother. Sources assert that this is why she was able to receive specialist education for an artist's career. Her great uncle, Wilhelm Nagel (1866-1945), who taught art both at the Academy of Fine Arts in Karlsruhe and at the Großherzogliche Malerinnenschule (royal arts academy), was able to bring her closer to the world of painting on the painting expeditions into the surrounding countryside that they undertook together. They painted landscapes.

Very little is known of Geißler's school years. A biographer speculates persuasively that having decided, during those painting trips with her great-uncle through the nearby Odenwald, that she wanted to make art her career, she left school when she was seventeen without ever completing the curriculum. The larger challenge, but one in which she was supported by Wilhelm Nagel, probably involved persuading her parents that her talent was sufficient to support her ambition, not withstanding the additional hurdles presented by her being a woman. That meant it was out of the question for her to enroll at the Academy of Fine Arts, so she enrolled, instead, at the Großherzogliche Malerinnenschule. The aftermath of World War I brought widespread hunger and hardship, along with an outburst of revolutionary activity on the streets of ports and cities, as the soldiers returned defeated and unemployed from the battlefront. Revolution also brought progress, however. In 1919 the Karlsruhe Academy of Fine Arts was renamed and relaunched. For the first time, women were to be admitted, and Senta Geißler switched to the academy, joining a course in drawing for the winter term of 1919/1920. The focus of the next year was on art-teaching (Vorbildungskurs), and in 1921/22 she took part on a specialist course for painters under the direction of Friedrich Fehr. The year after that she stayed on at the academy and was for a period a special student (Meisterschulerin) of Albert Haueisen (1872-1954) whom she greatly impressed, and with whom she remained in contact long after the conclusion of her formal education. It was Haueisen who gave her insights into the power of colours, sharpened her visual perception and awoke her creative enthusiasm for presenting landscapes and nature. In 1925 Senta Geißler returned to Heidelberg and set up her own studio at her parents' house.

== Marriage ==
In Winter 1926 she met the man who later became her husband. Albert Rohrbach was a physician from Ludwigshafen, a nearby industrial city that had grown prosperous though the rapid expansion of the Pharmaceuticals sector. Dr. Rohrbach was passionate about art. He was a member of various arts-relate associations: he was chairman of the "Kunstverein Ludwigshafen". And he was a collector, described in more than one source as an "avante-garde collector". Till this point Geißler had drawn inspiration from the German impressionists, notably Max Liebermann. Rohrbach helped her come to terms with influences from across the Rhine, notably Paul Cézanne and Henri Matisse. Her work became more "laid-back", individualistic and "dabby", with a growing attention to the reflections of light that references the work of the French impressionists. Rohrbach was a positive influence artistically and, more especially after they married, hugely supportive administratively. He kept meticulous records detailing where, when and how his wife's works had been included in exhibitions, and he organised her daily life in a way that seems to have suited them both.

== Career ==
Towards the end of the 1920s Senta Geißler began to gain public recognition. Her first significant exhibition involvement came in 1927 when 11 of her pictures were included in an exhibition at the "Kunsthandlung Vogel" gallery in Heidelberg. A year later her 1926 work "Frühling (Spring) in Rohrbach" was exhibited at the major annual art exhibition in Baden-Baden and was purchased, in the end, by the state for 300 marks. In 1930 the city of Heidelberg purchased her work "Rosen" ("Roses"), after which she held an exhibition at the Heidelberger Kunstverein, which then as now placed its focus on contemporary art. She exhibited delicately colorful drawings, many in the Japonisme style, from which several of the more immediately appealing motifs were reproduced as picture postcards. In 1932 Senta Geißler and Albert Rohrbach finally got married, setting up home in Ludwigshafen, on the west bank of the Rhine which had been vacated by French occupation forces a couple of years earlier. It was also in 1932 that the city of Ludwigshafen purchased Geißler's 1930 painting "White anemones".

The Nazi take-over in January 1933 ushered in a difficult period. Albert Rohrbach was an outspoken government critic who never troubled to hide his political beliefs. He was neither Jewish nor a Communist, but his candour nevertheless placed him in constant danger. He had also developed a drug dependency, and around this time lost his medical practice license. The surgery was closed and their home, which had been part of the same building, was lost. The couple moved back to Heidelberg and went to live with Senta's parents. From the twelve National Socialist years, which included six years of war, only two works by Senta Geißler have been identified. These are both landscapes dating from around 1940. She sent a few works from earlier periods to exhibitions, but most of her energies were devoted to supporting her husband who underwent several drug withdrawal crises: he eventually had his medical licence returned and was again able to work as a physician.

In 1956 Albert Rohrbach died. For a year and a half Geißler was plunged into aimlessness, loneliness and depression. Then, encouraged by a neighbour whom she had befriended, she took up her painting again. Initially she returned to the style she had followed when she had left off painting. There were a lot of still lifes. But there seemed to be a greater focus on individual objects: the works were more concentrated and fuller, and she began to work with different colours and surfaces. Gradually artistic strength and confidence returned. She began to wander out into Ludwigshafen's destroyed streetscapes and then to record the postwar reconstruction. It is striking, however, that human figures become ever rarer in Geißler's work, and in the end they disappear completely from her paintings.

In 1958 she traveled to Italy. During this time she developed a new way of working. She was less and less inclined to produce a finished canvas directly, and worked more from sketches. Later she also used photographs or even postcards. Her style also changed: Impressionist elements disappeared, while her pieces became more carefully structured and arranged. There was another Italian trip in 1959. Following her mother's death that year she took the decision to settle in Italy. She based herself in a succession of locations before ending up in Agrigento on the southern coast of Sicily. Here she produced numerous sketches, generally with architectural features in view, but nature remained a defining inspiration. There were also still lifes, now with the elements carefully arranged. After 1970 she often photographed these. Over the years her style continued to evolve. The architectural pieces became more abstract and more compact, with careful colour choices to emphasize different moods. By now she was almost always using photographs as templates for her paintings. Back in Germany Geißler was honoured with a solo GEDOK exhibition in 1964. She also took part in various exhibitions in Italy and received various awards during the 1960s.

After fifteen years Senta Geißler returned to Ludwigshafen in 1974 and involved herself in the arts community there, working with various arts related organisations. She also made a start on sorting out her late husband's art-related legacy. She herself no longer painted much. Senta Geißler died in 2000 a few months after her 98th birthday.

== Legacy ==
Her artistic archive is held by the Wilhelm Hack Museum of Modern and Contemporary Art in Ludwigshafen. They also hold the art collection built up by her husband, Albert Rohrbach. In 2008 the Rudolf Scharpf Galery at the Wilhelm Hack Museum teamed up with the Ludwigshafen City Museum to present a retrospective exhibition of Geißler's work.
