= Magda Kröner =

German artist

- Born: Magda Helmcke; 24 January 1854; Rendsburg, Duchy of Holstein
- Died: 31 October 1935 (aged 81); Düsseldorf, Germany
- Known for: Painting
- Spouse: Christian Kröner (m. 1883; died in 1911)

Magda Kröner (1854–1935) was a German painter known for her still lifes.

== Biography ==
Kröner née Helmcke was born on 24 January 1854 in Rendsburg, Germany. In 1883 she married the painter Christian Kröner (1838–1911) with whom she had two children. In 1895 she exhibited her art at the Crystal Palace in London where she received a bronze medal. In 1901 Kaiser Wilhelm II purchased two of her paintings.

The Kröners settled in Düsseldorf and one of their sons, Erwin Kröner (1889–1963), had a career in painting.

Kröner died on 31 October 1935 in Düsseldorf.

== Gallery ==
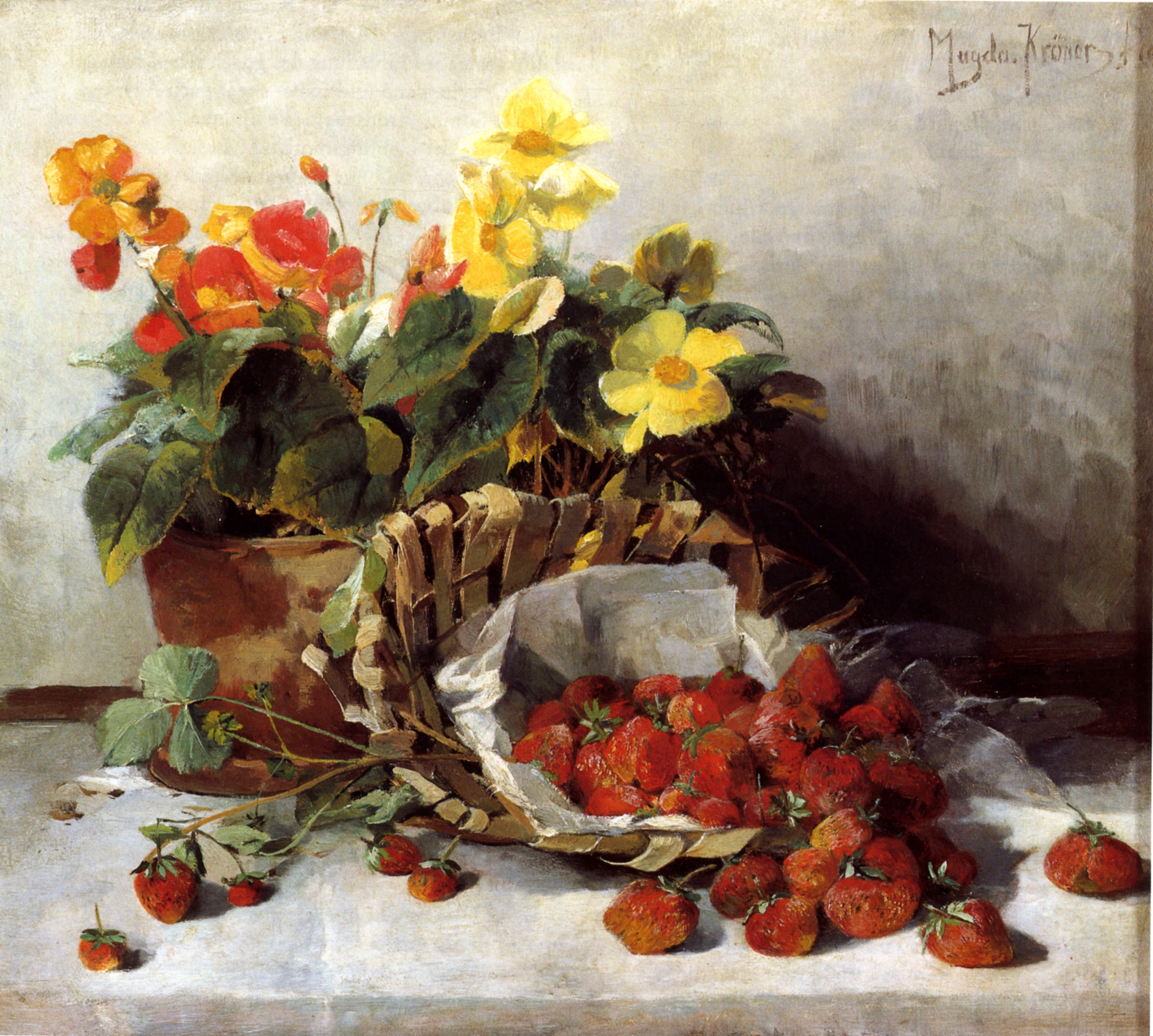
Stillleben

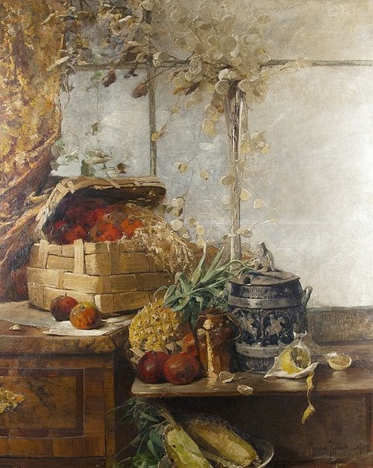
Großes Stilleben

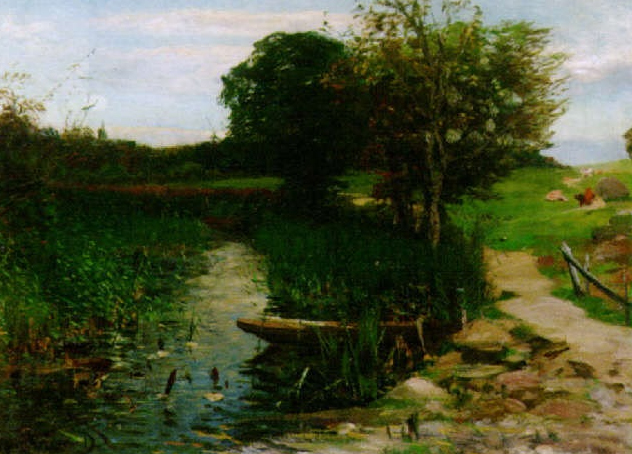
Sommerliche Flußlandschaft
