= Olga Beggrow-Hartmann =

German-Russian painter

- Born: 29 October 1862; Heidelberg, Grand Duchy of Baden
- Died: 12 January 1922 (aged 59); Munich, Germany
- Known for: Painting
- Spouse: Karl Hartmann

Olga Fedorovna Beggrow-Hartmann (1862–1922) was a German-Russian painter.

== Biography ==
Beggrow-Hartmann was born on 29 October 1862 in Heidelberg, Grand Duchy of Baden. She studied art at the Staatliche Kunstakademie in Stuttgart where she was taught by Ferdinand Keller. She was married to the painter Karl Hartmann (Maler, 1861). Beggrow-Hartmann lived for a time in Saint Petersburg, Russia.

She exhibited her work at the Woman's Building and at the Russian Exhibition at the 1893 World's Columbian Exposition in Chicago, Illinois.

Beggrow-Hartmann died on 12 January 1922 in Munich, Germany.

== Gallery ==
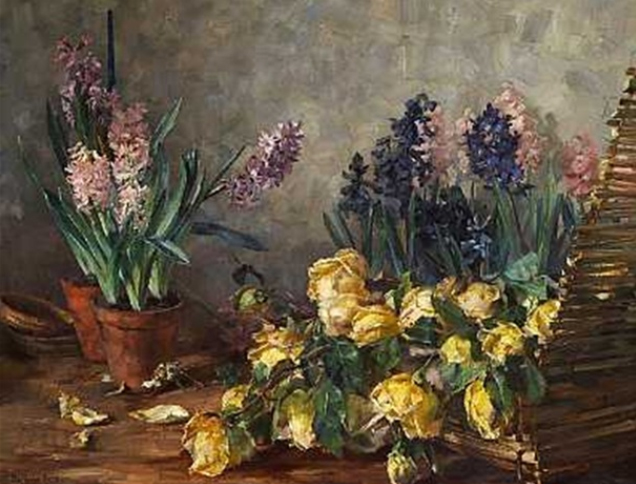
Still life with hyacinths and roses on a table

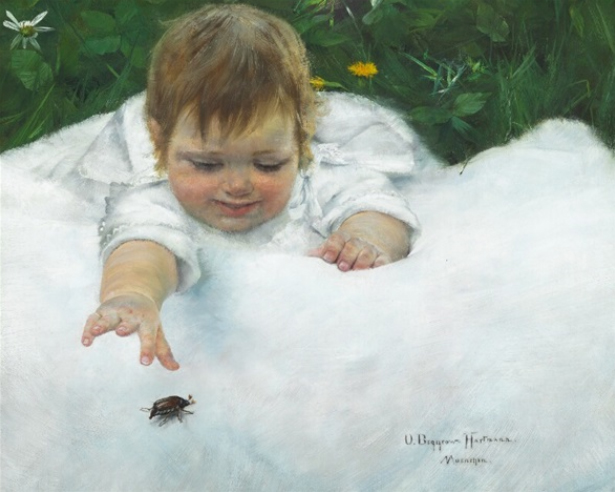
A little girl catching a beetle on the white quilt
