= Dorothea Schwartz Zimmer =

German artist

Dorothea Schwartz Zimmer was a German painter active around 1800.

Daughter of the painter Johann Christian August Schwartz, Zimmer was married to painter and draughtsman Johann Samuel Zimmer; upon his death she married her cousin, painter Joseph Dantieux. Active in Göttingen, where her first husband taught at the university, she was recorded during her lifetime as a portraitist working in oils and pastel, and to have produced landscapes as well. Another source records that she painted portrait miniatures as well. None of her work is known to survive, but she has been posited as the artist of a head of Samuel Taylor Coleridge dating to c. 1799 and currently attributed to an anonymous artist.
