= Johanna Dorothea Sysang =

German copper engraver (1729-1791)

- Born: April 7, 1729; Dresden, Germany
- Died: March 2, 1791 (aged 61); Leipzig, Germany
- Known for: Engraving and illustration

Johanna Dorothea Sysang (1729-1791) was a German engraver.

Sysang was born on April 7, 1729 in Dresden, Germany. Her father, Johann Christoph Sysang, taught her the art of engraving in copper. Sysang died on March 2, 1791 in Leipzig, Germany.

Her work is in the Nationalmuseum, the New York Public Library, the Rijksmuseum and the Royal Collection Trust.

== Gallery ==
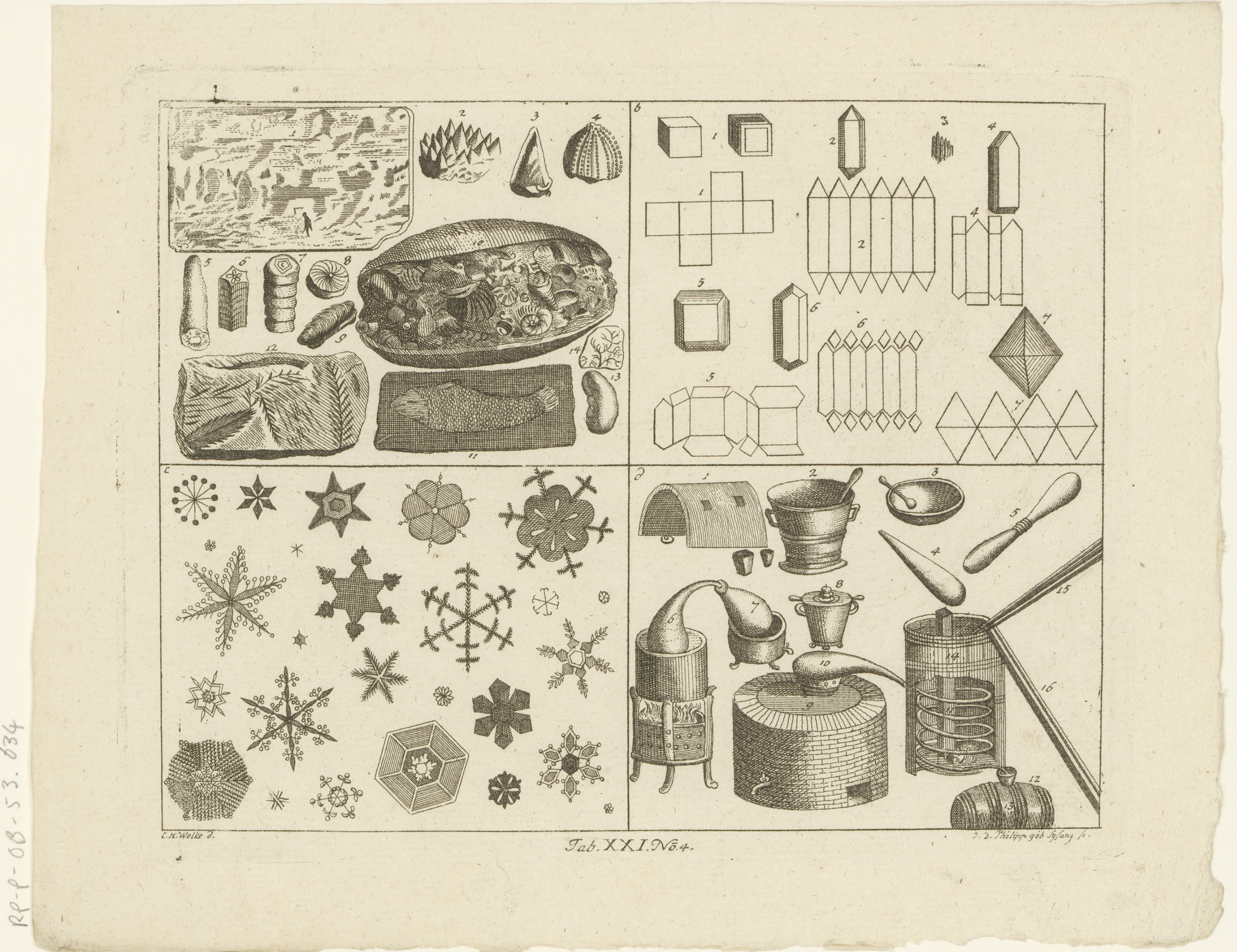
Encyclopedische voorstelling van fossielen, geometrie, ijskristallen en ovens

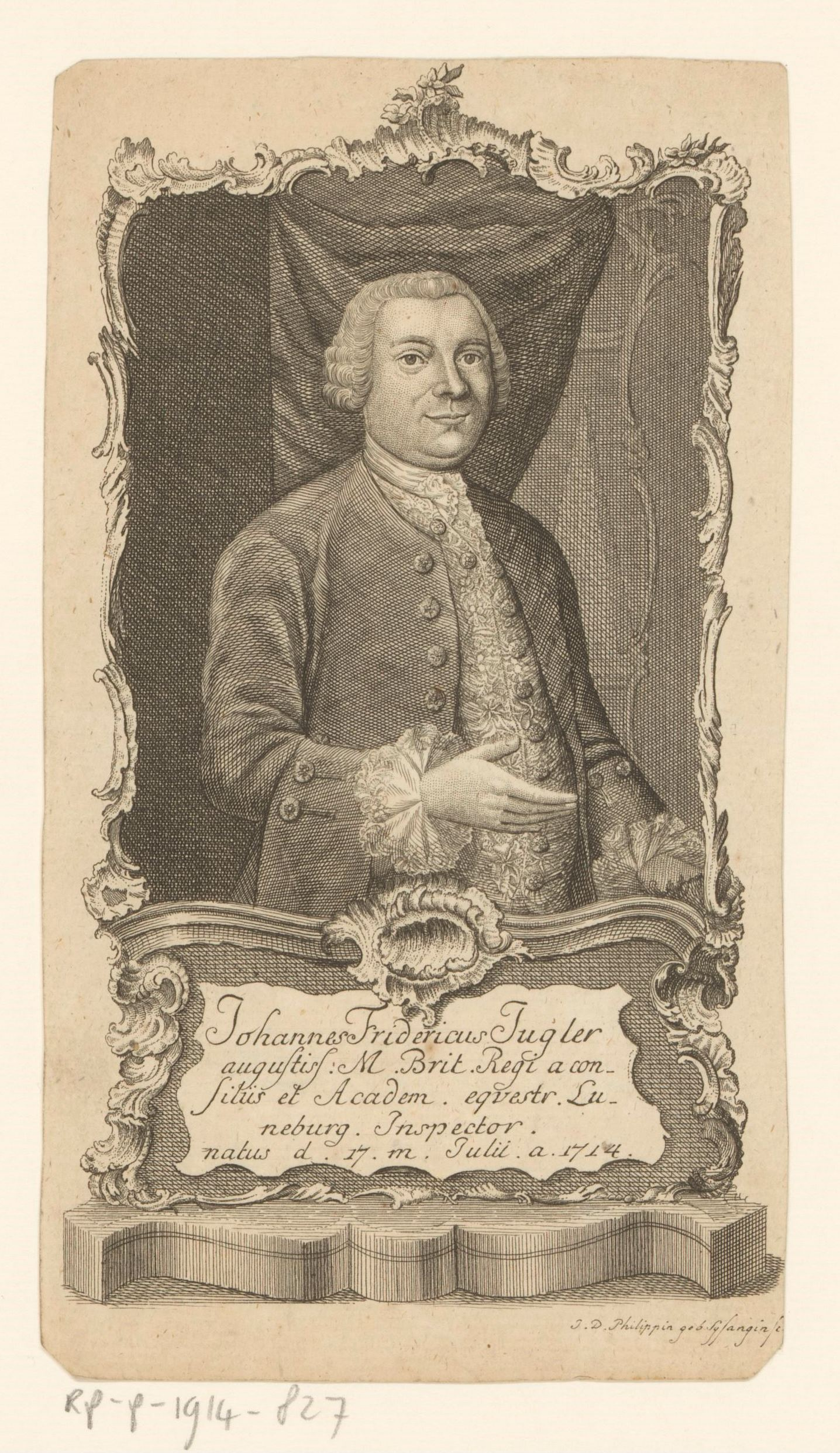
Portret van Johann Friedrich Jugler

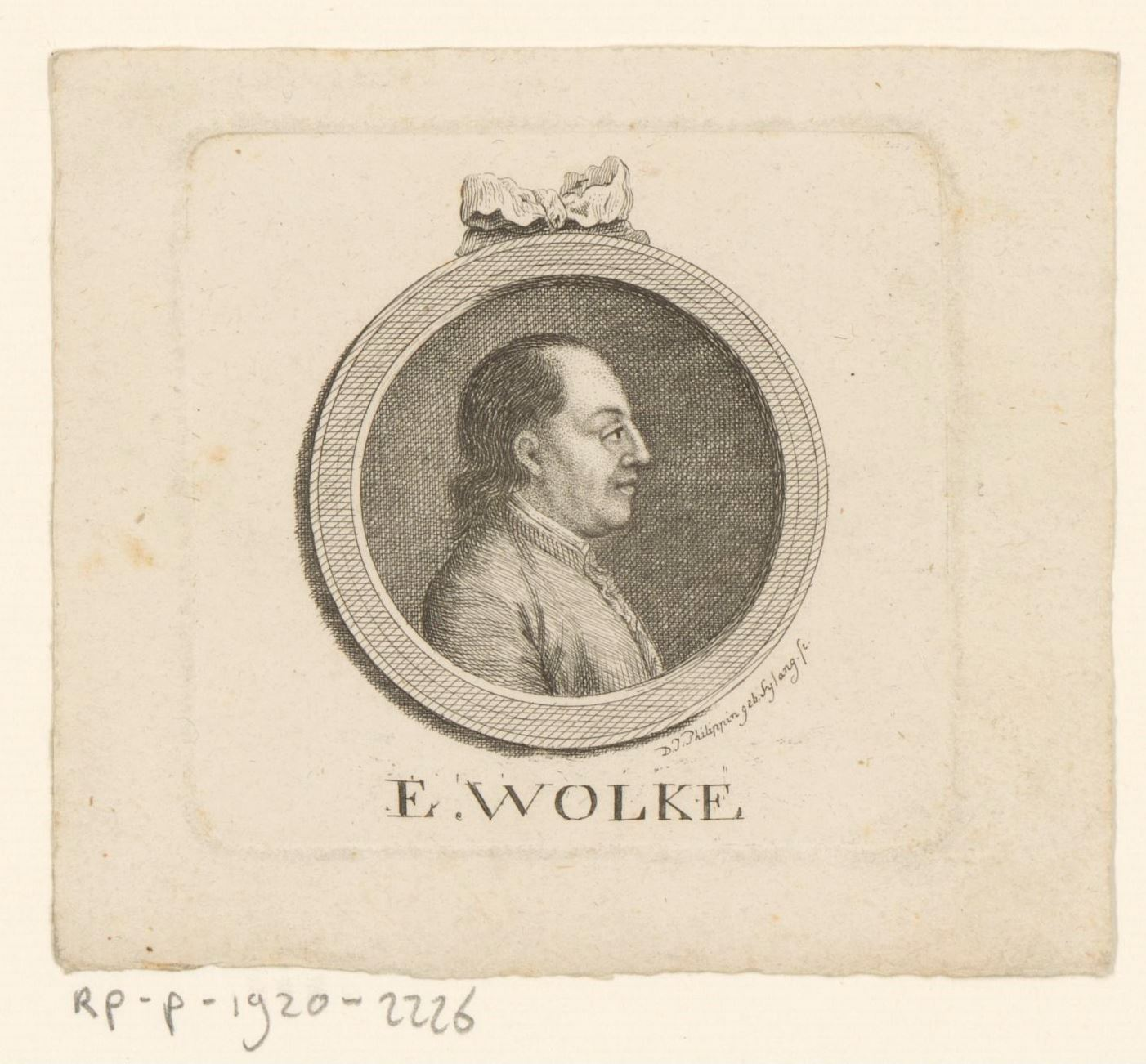
Portret van E. Wolke
