= Anna Maria Werner =

German artist (1688–1753)

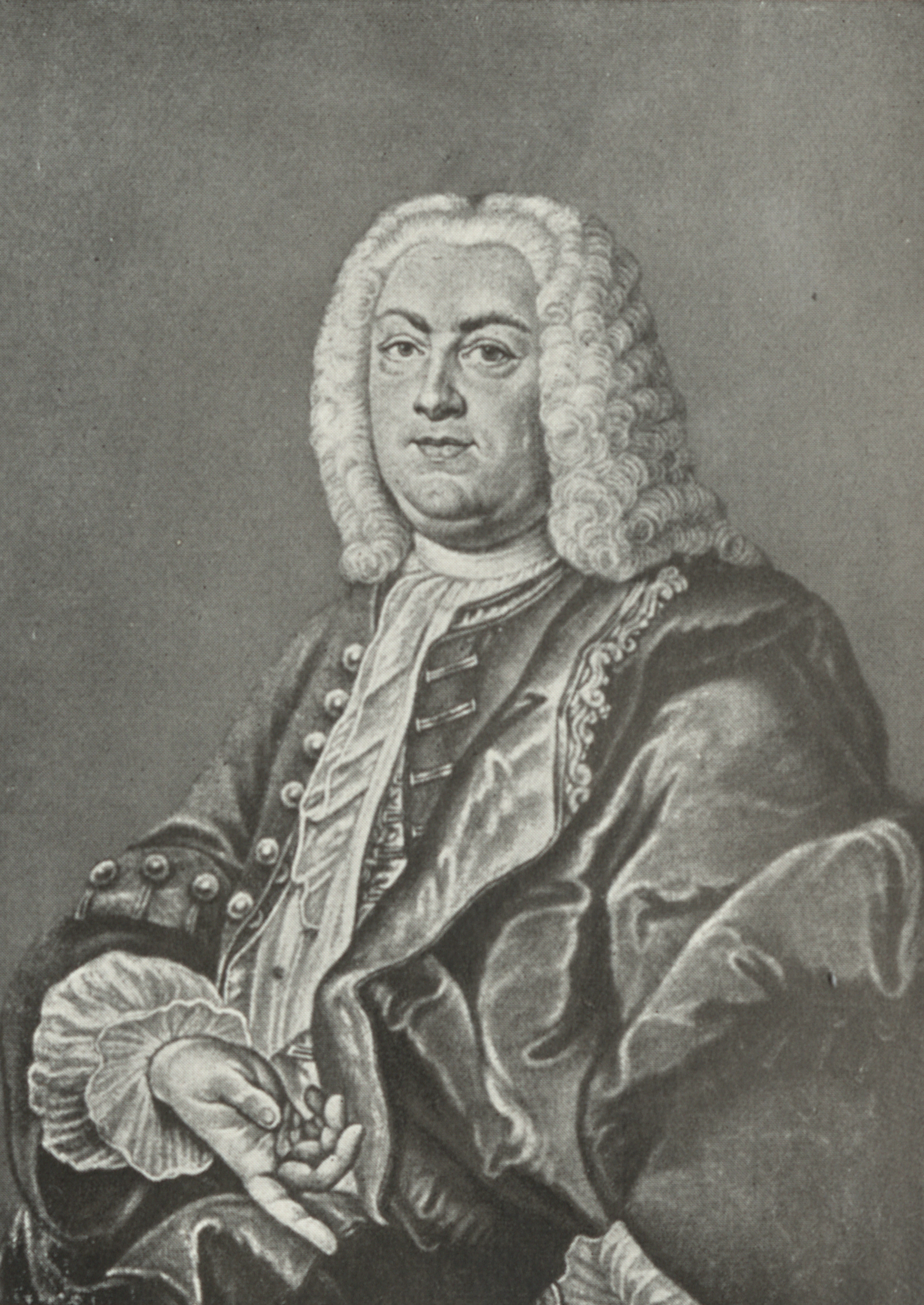
Johann Christoph Gottsched by Anna Maria Werner

Anna Maria Werner, née Haid (1688–1753) was a German painter. Her maiden name has sometimes been given as Hayd or Heid, and her married name as Wernerin or Vernerin; her first name is sometimes given as Marianna.

Born in Gdańsk, then part of the Polish-Lithuanian Commonwealth, Werner was the daughter of an important Berlin goldsmith; later she married the painter Christoph Johann Werner and moved to Dresden, Electorate of Saxony. Active as a miniature painter, she also taught, counting among her pupils painter Christian David Müller, enamelist Johann Emanuel Göbel, and her own son, Christoph Joseph II Werner. In 1757 a biography was published in the Leipzig journal Das Neueste aus der anmuthigen Gelehrsamkeit. Werner died in Dresden; she has been credited by some, including the 1911 Encyclopedia Britannica, as the inventor of pastels.
