= Karin Baumeister-Rehm =

German artist

Karin Baumeister-Rehm (born 1971 in Bavaria, West Germany) is a German born artist. Her career spans many years, starting as an abstract painter, and developing into a major creative force. Today she is known for painted flowers and panel canvases. She prefers bright colors, enjoys painting texture, and blending acrylics.

== Biography ==
Having lived in Tokyo for a number of years before coming to the United States, Baumeister-Rehm's works can be correlated to Ikebana style art. Baumeister-Rehm lived in Apex, North Carolina with her husband Norbert, and two children, Tim and Jannik.

Baumeister-Rehm had a painting studio in Apex, North Carolina, and did metal work and welding in a studio in Siler City, North Carolina. She started a series with heritage and historical windows/metal work creations.

Baumeister-Rehm is the originator of the Nesting for Peace global art project.

She moved back to Bavaria, Germany in spring 2009.

== See also ==
- List of German painters
