= Elise Neumann Hedinger =

German painter

- Born: Elise Neumann; 3 July 1854; Berlin, Germany
- Died: 1923 (aged 68–69)
- Known for: Painting
- Spouse: Captain Hedinger (m. 1873)

Elise Neumann Hedinger (1854–1923) was a German painter known for her still life painting.

== Biography ==
Hedinger née Neumann was born on 3 July 1854 in Berlin, Germany. She studied in Germany and France with Charles Hoguet, Albert Hertel, Eugen Bracht, and Karl Gussow. Hedinger exhibited her work at the Woman's Building at the 1893 World's Columbian Exposition in Chicago, Illinois.

She died in 1923.

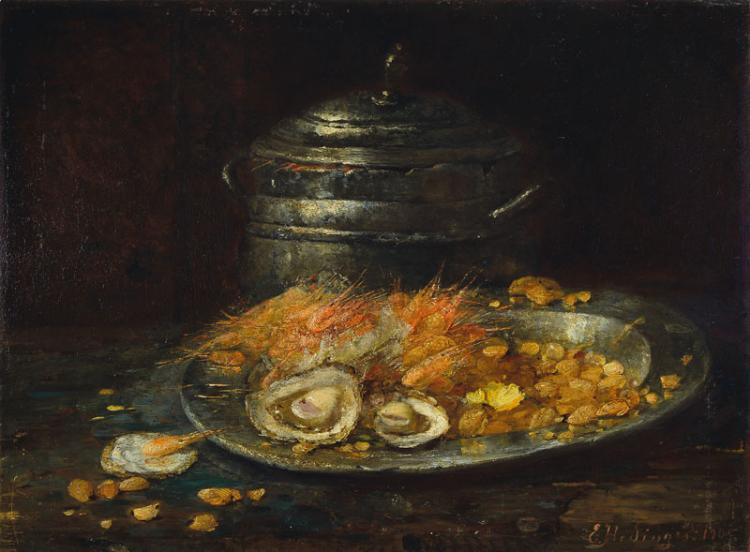
Still Life by Elise Neumann Hedinger
