= Eva Ursula Lange =

German artist (1928–2020)

Eva Ursula Lange (née Lorenz ; 11 September 1928, in Niederkaina – 20 December 2020) was a German painter, illustrator, graphic designer, and ceramist, best remembered for her works honouring Sorbian culture during the GDR. She was awarded a Ćišinski Prize and the Hans Grundig Medal in 1985. Her works were exhibited at the Art exhibition of the GDR, and at the Sorbian Museum.
