= Louise Droste-Roggemann =

German painter (1865–1945)

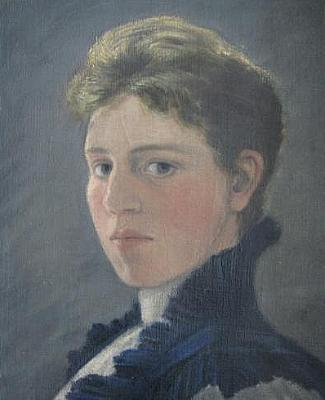
- Occupation: Painter
- Known for: Nature paintings

Louise Droste-Roggemann (20 October 1865 – 30 December 1945) was a German painter.

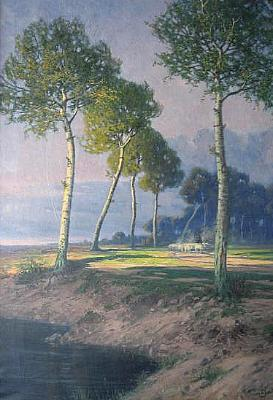
Sheep by the river

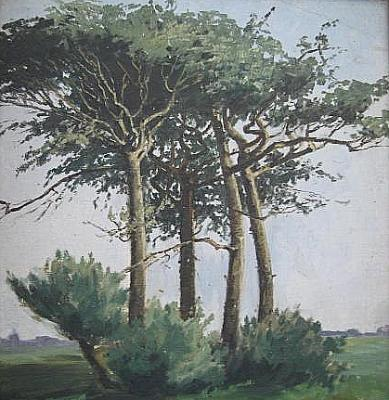
Pine trees

== Life ==
Droste-Roggemann completed school in Bad Zwischenahn where she excelled in drawing. She lived with her parents and siblings in a house on Bahnhofstraße. The house was demolished many years ago and today there is an old people's home on the property where Drose-Roggemann's parents used to live.

After finishing school, Droste-Roggemann decided to become an artist. She was able to finance her education and other trips from an inheritance. Around 1890, she left her parents' home and travelled to Weimar and Dresden. Both cities had art academies, whose teachers gave private painting and drawing lessons as an additional source of income. Since women were not yet admitted to art academies, private classes were the only available option for Droste-Roggemann. She probably lived in Dresden between 1890 and 1891, where she became acquainted with the Oldenburg painter Bernhard Winter, who went to the Kunstakademie Dresden in 1887 and studied painting there until 1891. Until 1900, Droste-Roggemann undertook many study trips, on which she created oil paintings and pencil sketches. She created many pencil sketches during her excursions to the mountains in Scandinavian countries.

After moving to Bad Zwischenahn in 1901, Droste-Roggemann became acquainted with Oskar Droste (1851–1941), a merchant from Bremen who had taken over a peat factory in the village. They married in 1902 and Louise took the surname Droste-Roggemann. In 1904 a daughter was born, their only child. After her return to Bad Zwischenahn, the artist took every opportunity to paint from nature.

== Gallery ==
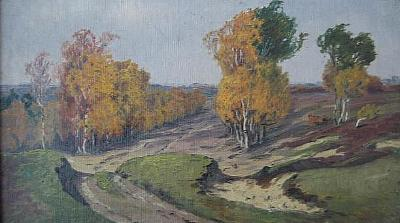
Birches in autumn

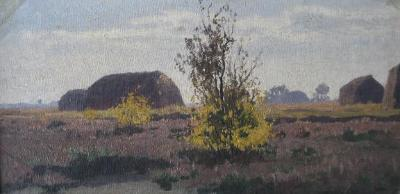
Broom blossom

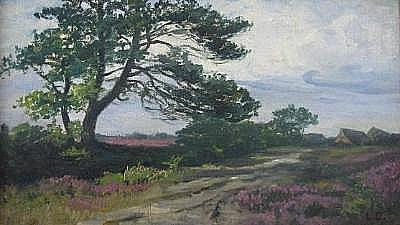
Landscape

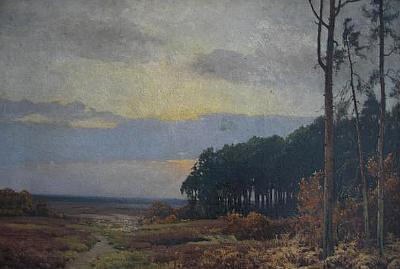
Landscape with pine forest

== Sources ==
- Heinrich Poppe und Horst Wichmann: Neues Dötlinger Dorfbuch. ISBN 3-87358-113-2
- Nils Aschenbeck: Künstlerkolonie Dötlingen. ISBN 3-932292-76-2
- Jürgen Derschewsky: Oldenburger Künstler. Nordwest-Zeitung Dezember 2008
