= Elsa Oeltjen-Kasimir =

German sculptor and painter (1887–1944)

Elsa Oeltjen-Kasimir (8 March 1887, in Ptuj – 5 December 1944, in Ptuj) was a German sculptor, painter, and graphic artist. Her works are today part of the State Museum for Art and Cultural History and the Stadtmuseum Oldenburg. She was the sister of Luigi Kasimir.
