= Frédérique Émilie Auguste O'Connell =

German painter (1822–1885)

Frédérique O'Connell
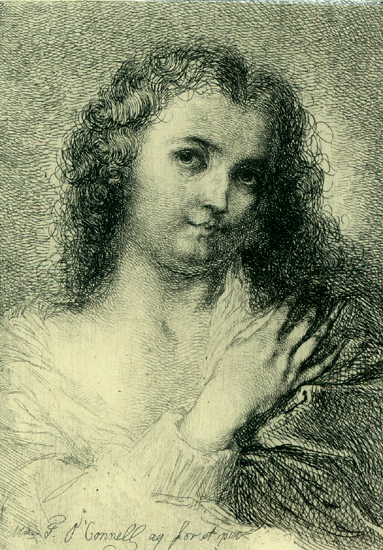
- Self-Portrait, Etching drawn by Frédérique O'Connell, published by L'Artiste in 1879
- Born: Emilie Friederike Auguste Miethe; 28 March 1822; Potsdam, Germany
- Died: 21 October 1885 (aged 63); Paris, France
- Known for: Painting
- Movement: Romanticism
- Spouse(s): Carl Joseph Begas; Louis Gallait

Frédérique Émilie Auguste O'Connell, born Emilie Friederike Auguste Miethe (28 March 1822 – 21 October 1885), was a German painter and portraitist. Her work was in vogue among the Parisian social set of the Second Empire. Her works of engraving, rare and limited in number, were prized by the critics of the era. Nonetheless, she died forgotten as an artist.

Madame O'Connell is mentioned in the memoir of Irish pastel portraitist Henriett Corkran (1841/2- 1911) who recalled that O'Connell lived and worked in La Place Vintimille, in Paris. Miss Corkran, who wished to become one of O'Connell's pupils, described her as having a 'plain countenance ... redeemed by wonderful dark eyes, full of fire and intelligence'. Among the paintings Corkran observed in Madame O'Connell's studio were portraits of poet Théophile Gautier, author Alexandre Dumas and the social reformer le Père Enfantin. Corkran further recalls that O'Connell was 'interested in the rights of humanity, the liberty of women.
