= Christiane Löhr =

German artist

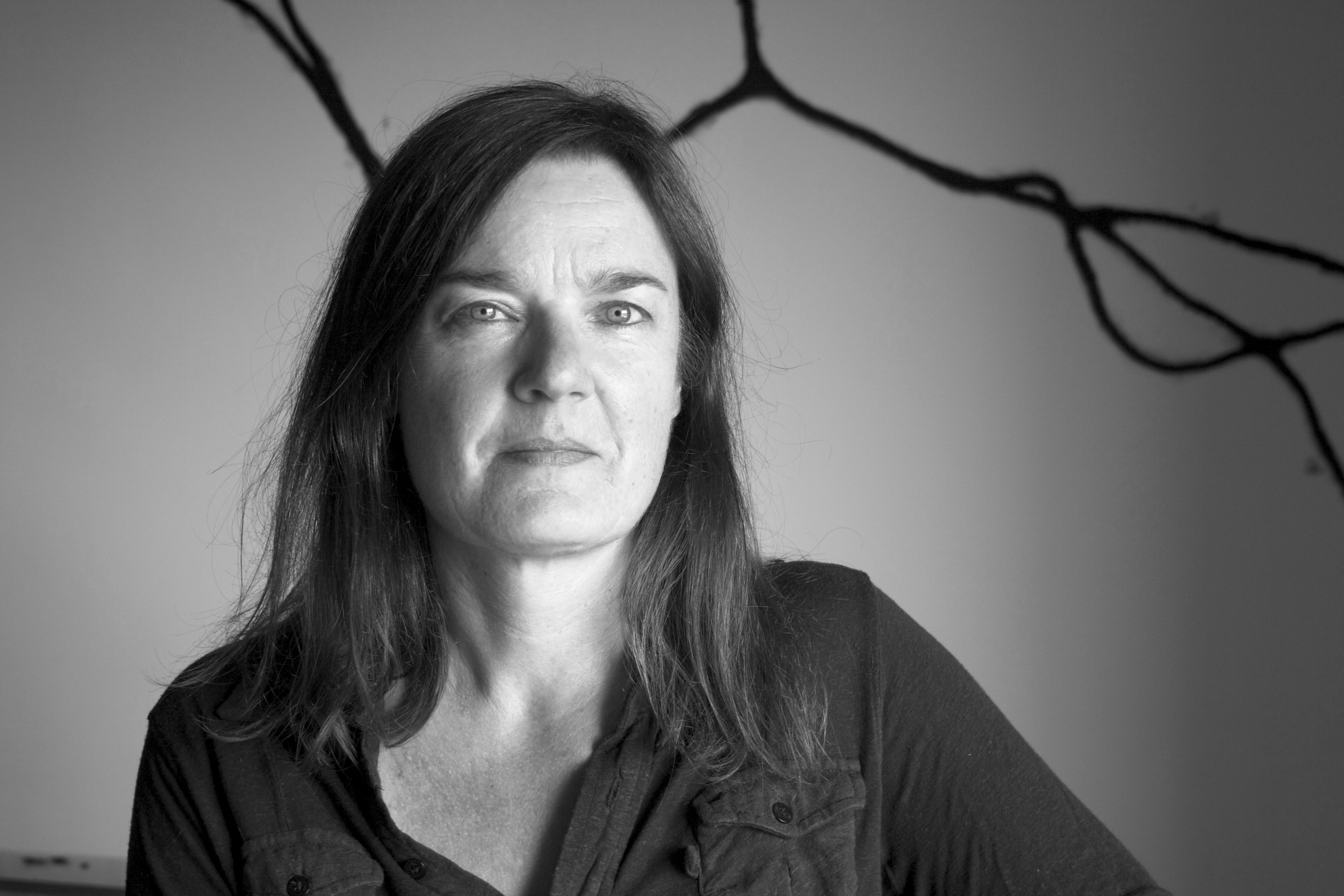
Portrait of Christiane Löhr, 2018, Photographer Salvatore Mazza

Christiane Löhr (born 1965 in Wiesbaden) is a contemporary German artist, who lives and works in Cologne, Germany and near Prato, Italy.

== Life and work ==
Born in Wiesbaden in 1965, Christiane Löhr studied Egyptology, classical archeology and history at the University of Bonn and art education and German studies at the University of Mainz before enrolling at the Kunstakademie Düsseldorf, where she completed her master student degree in 1996 by Jannis Kounellis. She is member of the Deutscher Künstlerbund and since 2020 member of the North Rhine-Westphalian Academy of Sciences and Arts in Düsseldorf.

Christiane Löhr, Installation view of dividere il vuoto at Villa e Collezione Panza, 2010

Löhr is best known for her sculptures and installations that are composed of organic elements as construction materials, including horsehair, airborne seeds, plant stalks, tree blossoms, burrs and other elements from nature. The Italian art historian Germano Celant describes her artistic attitude as follows: “Contrary to the heaviness and the physical and environmental gravity of much contemporary sculpture, the aspiration of this German artist is to express a sense of delicacy and evanescence, softness and lightness.” She uses oil stick, ink and graphite as drawing material. ”Surface and space are the major themes of her drawings. Linear structures 'grow' out from a point often from the bottom of the page to the top edge, the artist describes this effect as 'a streaming out, from the inside to the outside'. Optically the structures strive for space far beyond the borders of the paper, it seems they could grow endlessly and take over the room.”

Löhr has exhibited extensively in Europe, Asia and in the United States, including at the 49th Biennale di Venezia. Her solo exhibition at the Villa Menafoglio Litta Panza in Varese, Italy, in 2010, was the last exhibition conceived by the acclaimed collector Giuseppe Panza.
