= Martina Schradi =

German cartoonist

- Born: 1972 (age 53–54); Nuremberg, Bavaria, West Germany
- Occupation: Cartoonist
- Known for: Oh, I see?!
- Awards: ICOM-Sonderpreis der Jury 2015 for exceptional comic book publications Michael-Schmidpeter-Sonderpreis 2014
- Website: comic-von-schradi.de

Martina Schradi (/ʃʁadi/ born 1972) is a German author, cartoonist and certified psychologist from Nuremberg. She is known for Oh, I see?!, a collection of comics depicting the daily lives and struggles of people in the LGBT*I community. After successfully exhibiting her work, Schradi began travelling throughout Germany to conduct workshops and readings. These workshops are designed to inform people on how to use her comics to fight prejudice.

== Career ==
After completing her Psychology diploma in Erlangen and Amsterdam, Schradi practiced as a psychologist for several years. In addition, she completed degrees in Communication Design and Media Author in Nuremberg and Stuttgart. Eventually, she returned to sketching comics, a childhood passion, spending several years self-publishing them. Some of her comics have been released as the book Oh, I see?! (Ach, so ist das?! in the original German title) with the publishing company Zwerchfell.

=== Oh, I see?! ===
Schradi noted discussions in the province of Baden-Wuerttemberg on the implementation of LGBT*I themes in the school curriculum as catalyst for Oh, I see?!. The comics are a collection of true stories about people ages 20–68 in the LGBT*I community. Different themes are found throughout the comics including coming out stories, anonymity at work and experiences on how peers at school view homosexuality. A book was first published in 2014, but many of the comics can also be found on the official website for Oh, I see?!, available in German, Chinese, English, Spanish, and Russian. A Chinese translation is in preparation Beyond being a collection of people's lives, it is an anti-discrimination project supported by the Federal Ministry of Family Affairs, Senior Citizens, Women and Youth in a project titled Toleranz fördern – Kompetenz stärken(Promoting tolerance-strengthening competence), the Human Rights Office of the City of Nuremberg, and the Hannchen-Mehrzweck-Stiftung. More details on this project are given in a chapter which Schradi co-authored in the book Teaching Gender.

=== Pedagogy in Germany ===
After discussions in Baden-Wuerttemberg concerning the inclusion of LGBT*I themes in the school curriculum were met with backlash, Schradi began collecting stories from people and sketched them. Studies demonstrating how many people are still too afraid to out themselves at work also inspired her to do her work. In addition to this, many teachers still do not react to homophobic behavior in the classroom. The success of the comics gave her opportunities to be involved in how LGBT*I themes can be incorporated in the classroom.

Beyond her work as a cartoonist, Schradi has been published, alongside Christine Burmann, in a chapter of Teaching Gender? titled Ach, so ist das?! Ein Antidiskriminierungsprojekt zu LSBTI* auch fuer die Schule (Oh, I see?! An anti-discrimination project about LSBTI* even for school). There they discuss how comics can offer insight into the life of the LGBT*I community on a textual and visual level. More specifically, how these comics can inform people at workshops as well as further educate teachers for their curriculum. The work's relevance is cited in the prevalence of homophobia in modern-day Germany. An online questionnaire showed that almost half of the participants had been discriminated against in the previous year, and a third were closeted at their school.

Until 2015, she was in charge of the blog Infothek Lehre, which is funded by the German ministry of education and research. It is a platform dedicated to informing teachers, and professors about current publications in the field of teaching. Schradi herself conducted interviews with people in the German education system from different fields where their ideas, methodologies, and goals were discussed.

== Activism ==
Schradi has made it her mission to expose people to the daily lives and trials of people in the LGBT*I community. This mission has been realized after her work was successfully exhibited in Nuremberg. Since then, she has introduced her work throughout Germany, Austria, Switzerland, Finland, Tunisia, Italy and Ukraine. A funding by the ministry of family has helped the team around Christine Burmann and Martina Schradi develop methodologies showing how teachers can discuss LGBT*I themes in their classrooms. In 2015, she had the opportunity to introduce her work at notable events such as the Proud At Work (PAW) conference. Ways in which comics, such as Oh, I see?!, may be used as teaching material are discussed in workshops. Oh, I see?! is already being used at the Friedrich-Alexander University in conventions and workshops for the further education of teachers.

Schradi also worked as federal manager for Lambda e.V. an organization that acts on behalf of LGBT*I youth in the political and public spectrum. It also offers youth an opportunity to discuss their feelings in a non-judgmental environment, where they can be themselves. In Schradi's own words, "We have dedicated ourselves to support the youth on their path of self-discovery and in psychological crisis situations."

== Works ==
=== Comics ===
Oh, I see?!(winner of the ICOM-Sonderpreis der Jury 2015 for exceptional comic book publications and Michael-Schmidpeter-Sonderpreis 2014) ISBN 978-3943547139

=== Non-Fiction ===
The chapter "Ach, so ist das?! Ein Antidiskriminierungsprojekt zu LSBTI* auch fuer die Schule" (Oh, I see?! An anti-discrimination project about LSBTI* even for school) for the book "Teaching Gender?"

A contribution to Patient Education for People with Parkinson's Disease and their Carers: A Manual

== Awards ==
- ICOM-Sonderpreis der Jury 2015 for exceptional comic book publications
- Michael-Schmidpeter-Sonderpreis 2014
- mentioned as an Extraordinary Book by the International Literature Festival Berlin
