= Henriette Schneider =

German artist (1747–1812)

Henriette Schneider (1747–1812) was a German painter.

Born in Neuwied, Schneider was the daughter of Ludwig Schneider. She produced portraits in pastel and enamel, and was proficient in miniature painting as well. She died in Munich.
