= Immeke Mitscherlich =

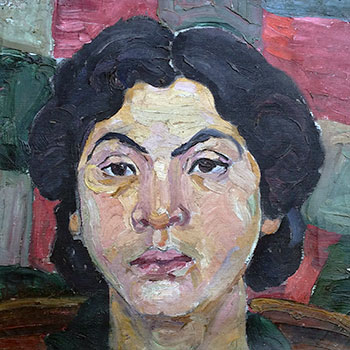
Portrait of Immedke Mitscherlich by Theodor Steinkühler (1919)

Immeke Mitscherlich née Emma Catarina Caroline Schwollmann (1899–1985) was a German textile artist. After completing studies in weaving in the late-1920s at the Bauhaus in Dessau, she married the artist Alexander Mitscherlich in March 1929 and moved with him to Krefeld in 1932. When her husband died in 1940, she worked for various textile manufacturers and taught at Krefeld's Textilingenieurschule (Weaving School) where she remained until her retirement in 1965. Her most celebrated work is the huge tapestry she created for the Landtag of North Rhine-Westphalia.

== Early life ==
Born on 29 April 1899 in Schmiedenau (now Kowalewo) near Margonin in the former Prussian Province of Posen, Emma (Immeke) Catarina Caroline Schwollmann was the daughter of the estate owner and later school principal Otto Schwollmann and his wife Gretchen née Rossell. Her elder sister Ilse Molzahn (1895–1981) became a successful writer. She began her studies in 1917 at the Bauhaus School in Weimar and continued at the Bauhous Dessau (1919–1927) where she studied weaving under Georg Muche. In March 1929 she married the artist Alexander Mitscherlich (1887–1940).

== Career ==
In the late 1920s, she worked as a weaver in Dessau, Magdeburg and Partenkirchen before moving to Berlin where she married Alexander Mitscherlich. In 1932, the couple moved to Krefeld where Immeke joined the informal political group known as "Die Kernianer".

When her husband died in 1940, she worked as a designer, first for Marva (later called Marna) and from 1950 for Weber & Co. In 1952, she was appointed a leading teacher in fashion and fashion design classes at the Krefeld Weaving School (Textilingenieurschule) where she remained until her retirement in 1940. Thereafter she lived in Krefeld with her daughter until the 1970s.

Mitscherlich's most celebrated work is the huge tapestry she designed for the State Parliament in North Rhine Westphalia. Created in 1971 and depicting the North Rhine horse (Roß), the Lippish Rose and the River Rhine, it hung on the rear wall of the plenary debating chamber of the former Landtag building in Düsseldorf.

Immeke Mitscherlich died in Diez an der Lahn on 30 May 1985.
