= Eva de Maizière =

German artist, sculptor and cellist

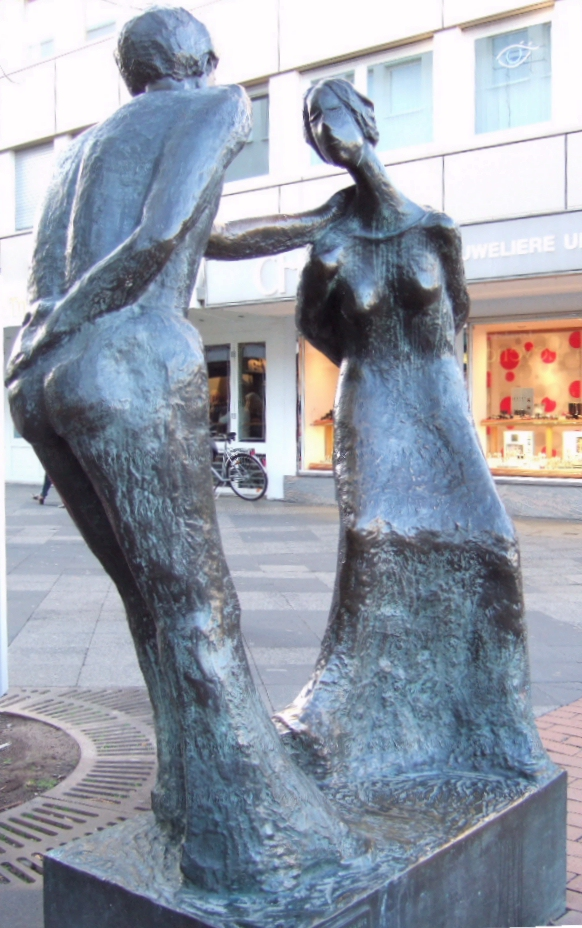
Begegnung, Bronzeskulptur de Maizières in Bad Godesberg

Eva de Maizière (née Werner; 27 March 1915, in Hanover – October 2003, in Bonn) was a German artist, sculptor and cellist. She was married to Ulrich de Maizière until her death in 2003. Their sons are Andreas and Thomas de Maizière, both politicians.
