= Sophie Schneider =

German painter

Sophie Schneider (30 October 1866, Blaufelden - 25 May 1942, Blaufelden) was a German painter.

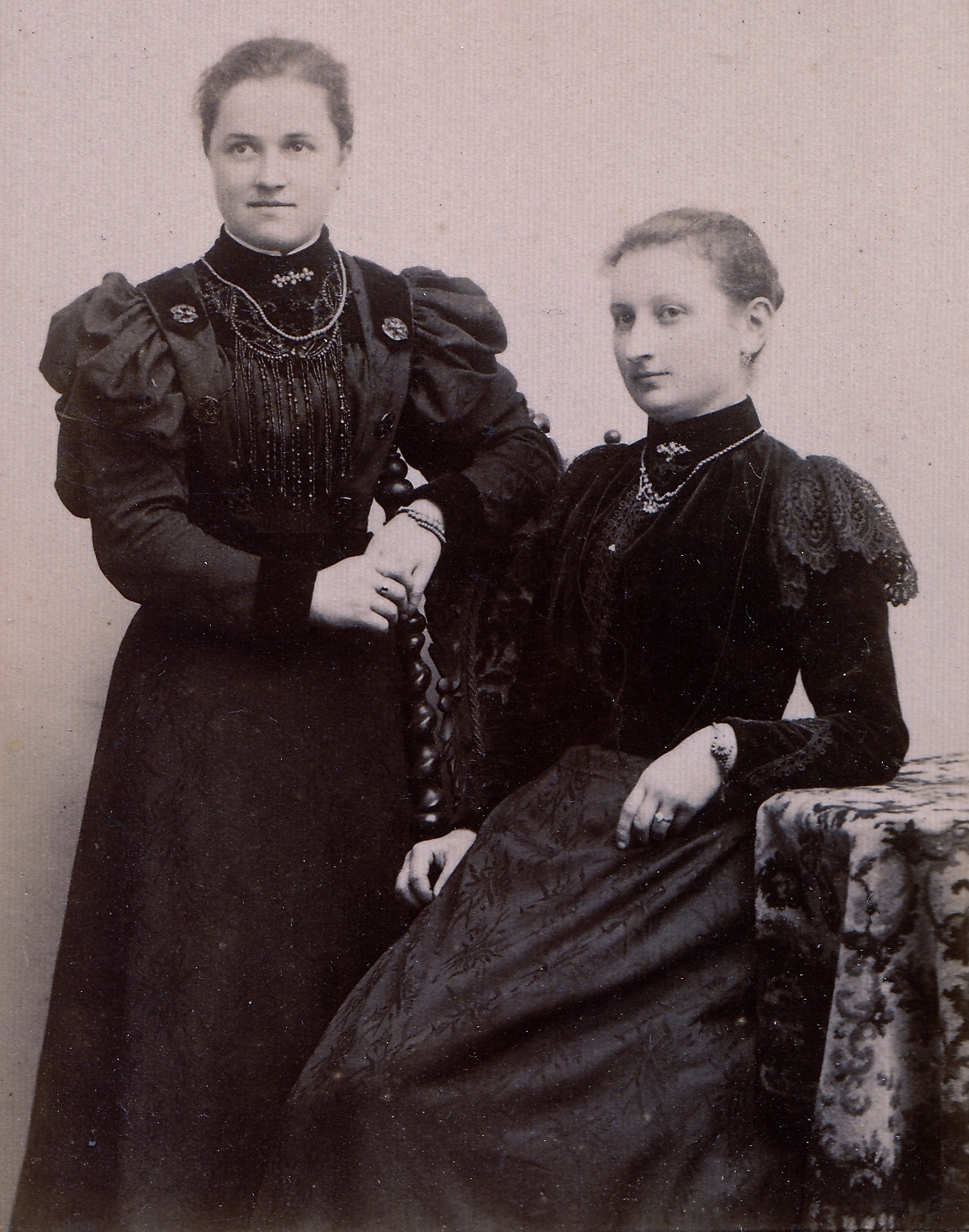
Sophie and Anna Schneider

== Biography ==
She was one of eight siblings born to a farming family and spent her youth working on their farm. In 1890, she went to Switzerland and taught German at a boarding school.

After brief stays in Paris and London, she went to a farm in Ireland, where her passion for painting was encouraged. After returning to Germany, she began taking formal art lessons in Hannover. This was followed by a trip to Italy, after which she went to live with her sister Anna in Berlin and set up a studio there. She also gave free drawing lessons and began to participate in exhibitions.

In 1911, she was back in Italy and visited Sicily. When World War I began, she returned to her home village, where she set up a facility to care for the sick and wounded.

She concentrated on scenes from everyday life, landscapes and city views. In addition, she created some religious paintings, commissioned by local churches. Many of her works were painted on cardboard.

Her sister, Betty (1875-1928), was also a painter of some note.

== Selected paintings ==
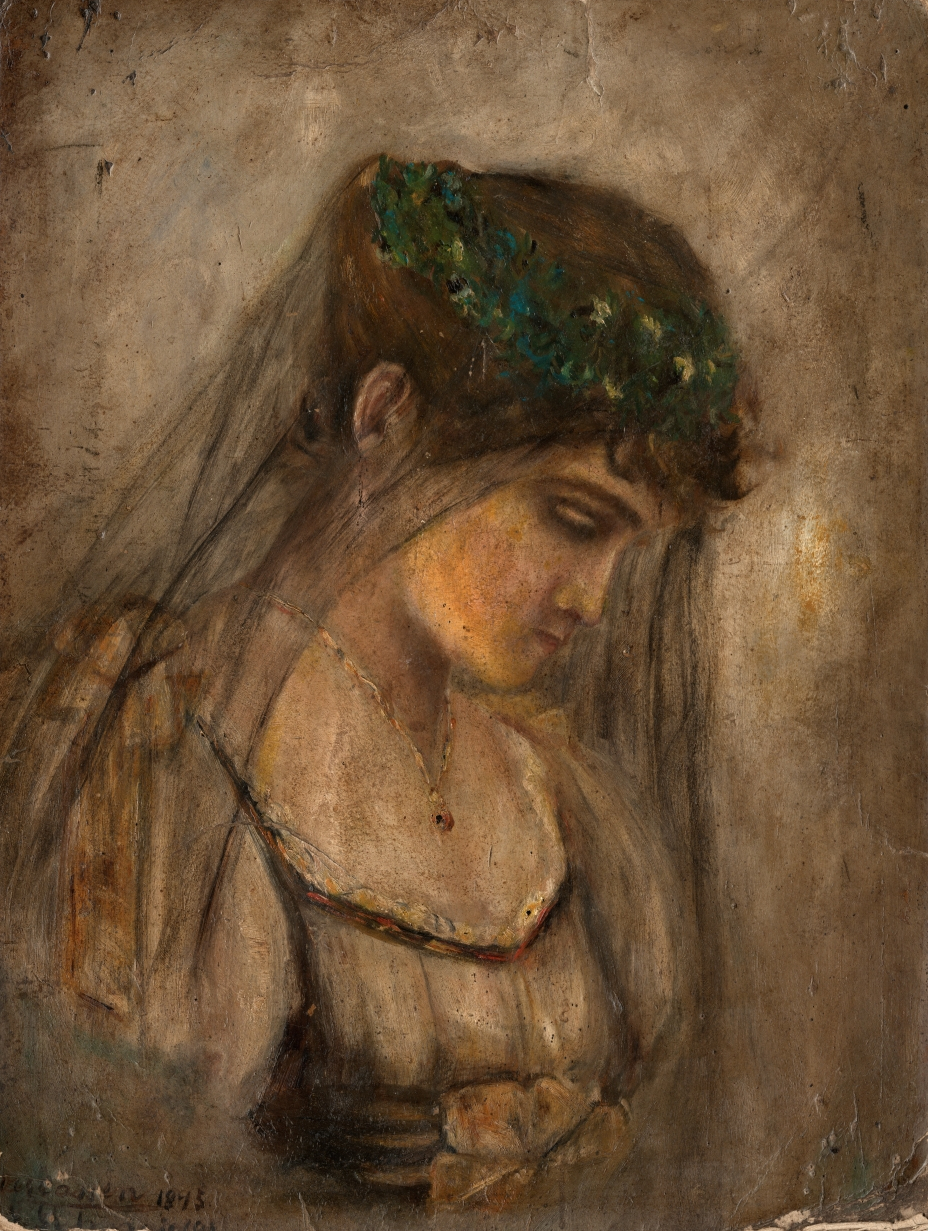
Untitled

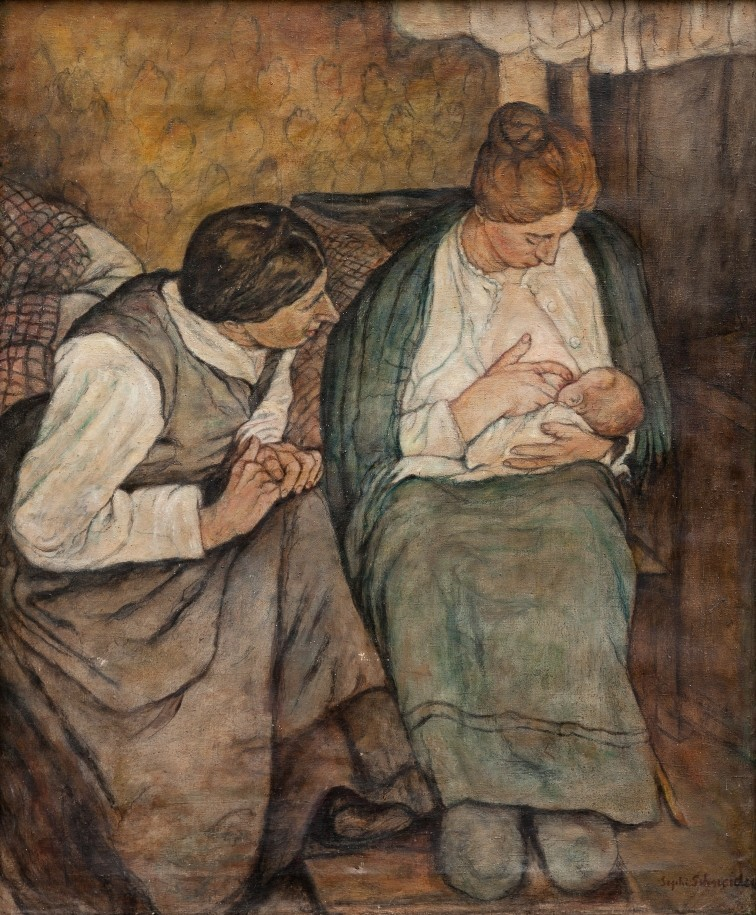
Three Marias

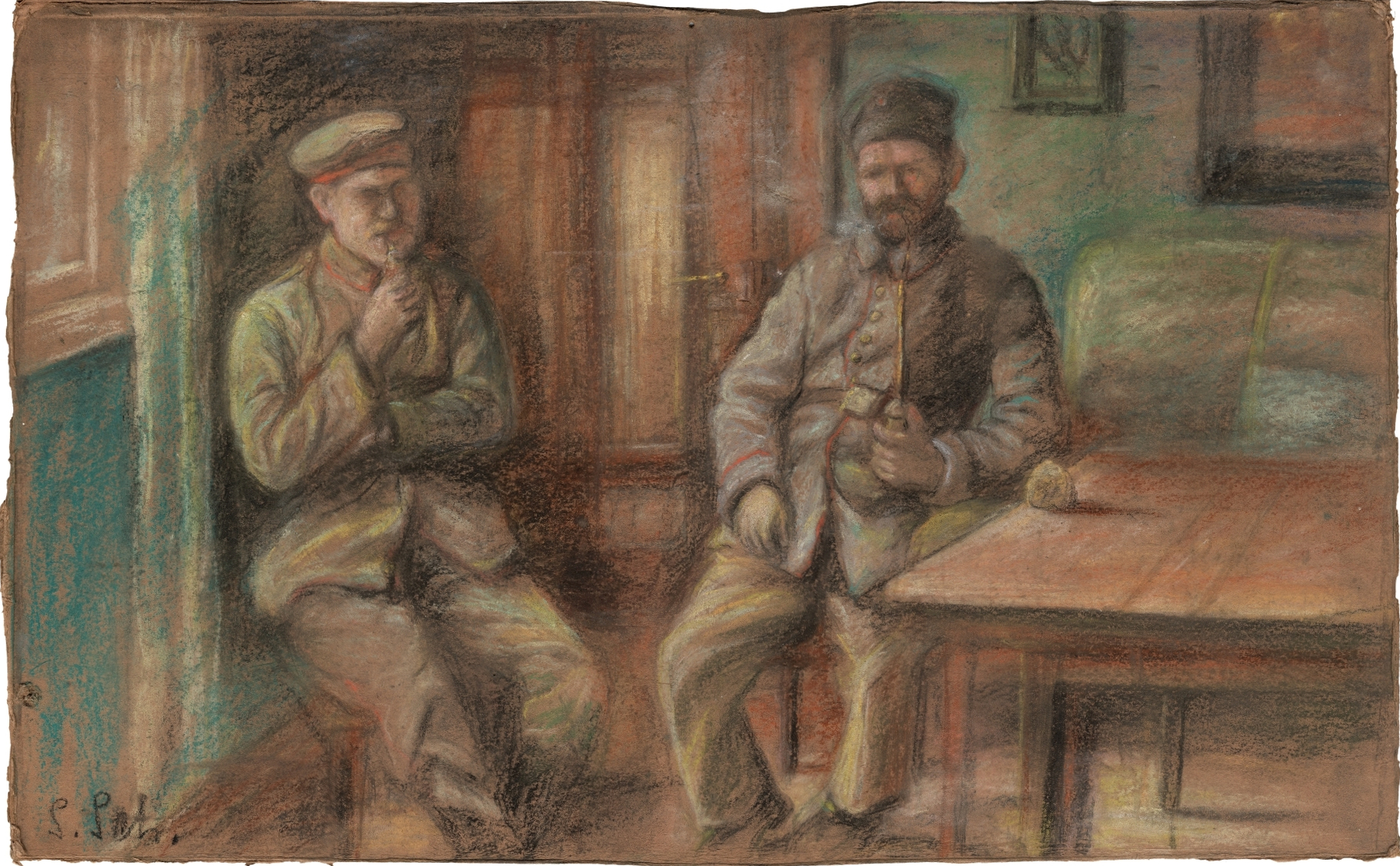
French Prisoners of War

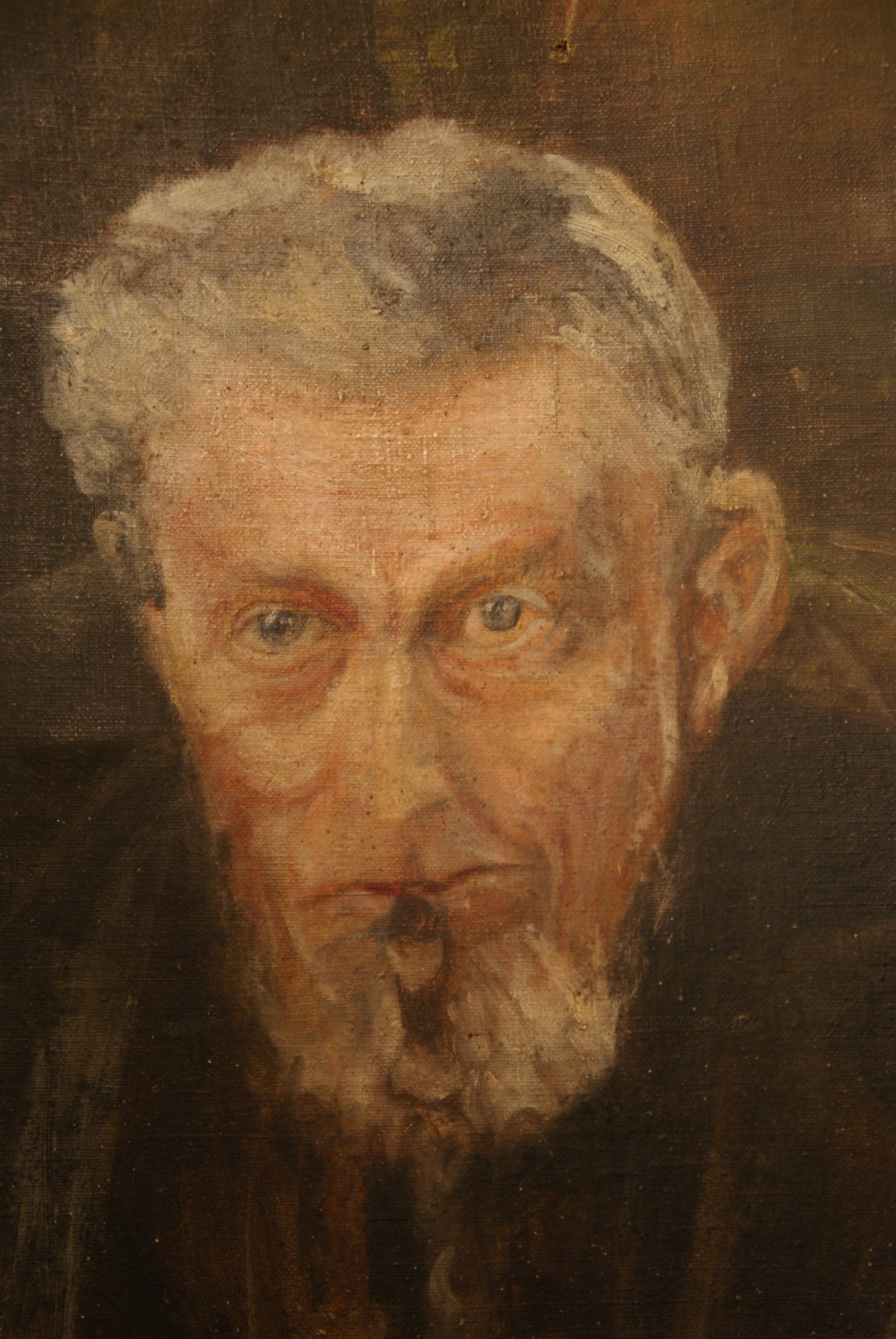
Portrait of her Father

== Sources ==
- Dieter Narr: Sophie Schneider. In: Württembergisch Franken. Jahrbuch. Vol.62, 1978, Pgs.144ff.
- Friederike Lindner: Sophie (1866–1942) und Betty (1875–1928) Schneider. Malerinnen aus Hohenlohe. Begleitbuch zur gleichnamigen Ausstellung im Stadtmuseum im Spital Crailsheim, 31. Mai bis 31. August 2014. Baier-BPB-Verlag, Crailsheim 2014, ISBN 978-3-942081-35-1
