= Anne Menke =

German photographer (born 1967)

Anne Menke is a German-born photographer now based in New York City who specializes in editorial advertising, and beauty photography.

== Biography ==
Anne Menke was born on March 26, 1967, in Wittlich, Germany. In 1987, she finished her apprenticeship in Germany and worked as an assistant in Düsseldorf for 2 years. She opened up her own studio, then moved to Paris in 1991 and worked on her own in fashion and advertising all around the world. In 1995, she moved to New York City and travelled around the world for her shoots. She also co-founded the Costa Verde International school in Sayulita, Mexico.

== Career ==
Anne Menke has shot for the Swimsuit Issue of Sports Illustrated. Her photographs have also been published in Self, Travel + Leisure Magazine, Cosmopolitan Germany, Elle France, Vogue Nippon, Vogue Russia, and Seventeen.
