= Ilse Jonas =

German painter

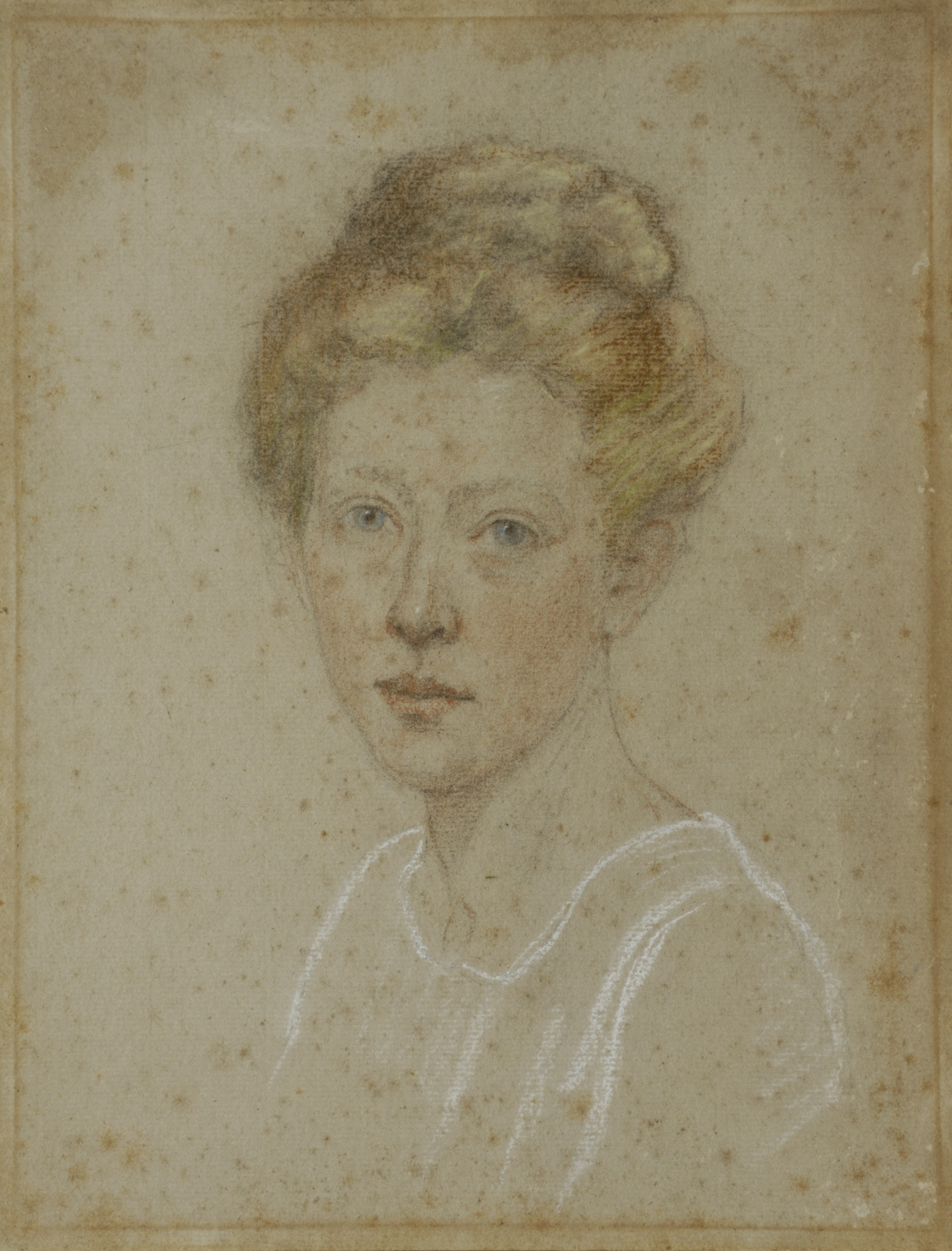
- Self-portrait
- Born: 29 May 1884; Berlin, Germany
- Died: 30 April 1922 (aged 37); Berlin, Germany
- Known for: Painting

Ilse Jonas (29 May 1884–30 April 1922) was a German painter.

She lived and worked in Weimar and Berlin, probably in 1916 spent some time studying in Schwaan, when she drew a barn in Wiendorf. That year she also made the painting Warnowbrücke (Warnow Bridge). Other women who came to study in Schwaan were Elisabeth von Aster, Barkenhöft, Lilly Schmidt, Hedwig von Germar, and Helene Dolberg.

== Early artistic education ==
Ilse Jonas wanted to be an artist at an early age, and with the support of her parents she took private painting lessons as a teenager. In 1904 she began her studies at the Verein der Künstlerinnen zu Berlin in 1867. Her teacher, Margarete Hoenerbach (1848-1924), was a portrait, still life and landscape painter. Jonas belonged to Hoenerbach's portrait class until 1909.

== Work ==
Jonas' artwork focuses on portraits and landscapes. Her known work comprises about 50 paintings, small sculptures and 6 sketchbooks, most of which are owned by the family.

== Association of Berlin Artists ==
On March 29, 1922, Ilse Jonas submitted the necessary documents and some of her works for admission to the Verein der Berliner Künstlerinnen. Shortly thereafter, on April 3, 1922, the Association of Women Artists in Berlin informed Ilse Jonas that she had been unanimously accepted as a member of the association on the basis of the works she had submitted. In the same month, on April 30, 1922, Ilse Jonas died of the effects of pneumonia, at a time when her free career as an artist was actually just beginning.
