= June 1 =

June 1 this year in various calendars
- Monday, 1 June 2026
Akan	Kurudwo
Armenian	16 Margach 1475
Aztec	Teotleco 2, 13 Itzcuintli
Babylonian	14 Ayaru, 2337 SE
Balinese pawukon	Menga, Pasah, Laba, Wage, Paniron, Coma of Julungwangi, Indra, Dangu, Dewa
Bengali	18 Joishtho, BS 1433
Chinese	Yang Fire Horse・Heart Mansion; Fire Horse Year, Month 4, Day 16 (Xiaoman, 4 days until Mangzhong)
Common Era	1 June 2026 CE
Coptic	24 Pashons, AM 1742
Egyptian	16 Phaophi, 2775 NE
Ethiopian	24 Genbot, 2018 Amätä Məhrät
French Republican	Décade II, Tridi de Prairial de l'Année 234 de la République
Gregorian	1 June, AD 2026
Hebrew	16 Sivan, AM 5786
Hindu	Jyeṣṭhā・Siddha; Solar: 18 Jyeṣṭha, 1948 SE; Lunisolar: Pratipada, Kṛishna pakṣa of Adhika Jyeṣṭha, 2083 VE; Rāudra・5127 KY・1,872,727
Icelandic	Mánudagur, 10 Skerpla 2026
Islamic	15 Dhu al-Hijjah, AH 1447 (using tabular method)
ISO week date	2026-W23-1
Japanese	16 Uzuki, Reiwa 8 (Shōman, 5 days until Bōshu)
Julian	19 May, AD 2026 (AM 7534)
Julian day	2461193
Korean	16 Baemdal, 4359 DE
Maya	13.0.13.11.10; 3 Zotz, 13 Oc
Roman	ante diem XIV Kalendas Iunias, MMDCCLXXIX AUC
Solar Hijri	11 Khordad, SH 1405
Tibetan	16 sa ga, me pho rta 2153 or 1772 or 1000

<<	June					>>
Su	Mo	Tu	We	Th	Fr	Sa
	1	2	3	4	5	6
7	8	9	10	11	12	13
14	15	16	17	18	19	20
21	22	23	24	25	26	27
28	29	30
2026

June 1 in recent years
2026 (Monday)
2025 (Sunday)
2024 (Saturday)
2023 (Thursday)
2022 (Wednesday)
2021 (Tuesday)
2020 (Monday)
2019 (Saturday)
2018 (Friday)
2017 (Thursday)

June 1 is the 152nd day of the year (153rd in leap years) in the Gregorian calendar; 213 days remain until the end of the year.

== Events ==
=== Pre-1600 ===
- 193 – The Roman Senate passes a motion proclaiming Septimius Severus emperor, awards divine honours to Pertinax, and sentences current emperor Didius Julianus to death.
- 1252 – Alfonso X is proclaimed king of Castile and León.
- 1298 – Residents of Riga and the Grand Duchy of Lithuania defeat the Livonian Order in the Battle of Turaida.
- 1412 – The Treaty of Lubowla between the kingdoms of Hungary and Poland is confirmed with one of the largest and magnificent royal meetings and feasts ever held in Buda. King Sigismund of Hungary host king Władysław II Jagiełło while several thousand nobles attend.
- 1494 – A monk, John Cor, records the first known batch of Scotch whisky.
- 1533 – Anne Boleyn is crowned Queen of England.
- 1535 – Combined forces loyal to Charles V attack and expel the Ottomans from Tunis during the Conquest of Tunis.

=== 1601–1900 ===
- 1648 – The Roundheads defeat the Cavaliers at the Battle of Maidstone in the Second English Civil War.
- 1649 – Start of the Sumuroy Revolt: Filipinos in Northern Samar led by Agustin Sumuroy revolt against Spanish colonial authorities.
- 1670 – In Dover, England, Charles II of England and Louis XIV of France sign the Secret Treaty of Dover, which will force England into the Third Anglo-Dutch War.
- 1676 – Battle of Öland: allied Danish-Dutch forces defeat the Swedish navy in the Baltic Sea, during the Scanian War (1675–79).
- 1679 – The Scottish Covenanters defeat John Graham of Claverhouse at the Battle of Drumclog.
- 1773 – Wolraad Woltemade rescues 14 sailors at the Cape of Good Hope from the sinking ship De Jonge Thomas by riding his horse into the sea seven times. Both he and his horse, Vonk, are drowned on his eighth attempt.
- 1779 – The court-martial for malfeasance of Benedict Arnold, a general in the Continental Army during the American Revolutionary War, begins.
- 1792 – Kentucky is admitted as the 15th state of the United States.
- 1794 – The battle of the Glorious First of June is fought, the first naval engagement between Britain and France during the French Revolutionary Wars.
- 1796 – Tennessee is admitted as the 16th state of the United States.
- 1812 – War of 1812: U.S. President James Madison asks the Congress to declare war on the United Kingdom.
- 1813 – Capture of USS Chesapeake.
- 1815 – Napoleon promulgates a revised Constitution after it passes a plebiscite.
- 1831 – James Clark Ross becomes the first European at the North Magnetic Pole.
- 1849 – Territorial Governor Alexander Ramsey declared the Territory of Minnesota officially established.
- 1854 – Åland War: The British navy destroys merchant ships and about 16,000 tar barrels of the wholesale stocks area in Oulu, Grand Duchy of Finland.
- 1855 – The American adventurer William Walker conquers Nicaragua.
- 1857 – Charles Baudelaire's Les Fleurs du mal is published.
- 1857 – The Revolution of the Ganhadores begins in Salvador, Bahia, Brazil.
- 1861 – American Civil War: The Battle of Fairfax Court House is fought.
- 1862 – American Civil War: Peninsula Campaign: The Battle of Seven Pines (or the Battle of Fair Oaks) ends inconclusively, with both sides claiming victory.
- 1868 – The Treaty of Bosque Redondo is signed, allowing the Navajo to return to their lands in Arizona and New Mexico.
- 1879 – Napoléon Eugène, the last dynastic Bonaparte, is killed in the Anglo-Zulu War.
- 1890 – The United States Census Bureau begins using Herman Hollerith's tabulating machine to count census returns.

=== 1901–present ===
- 1913 – The Greek–Serbian Treaty of Alliance is signed, paving the way for the Second Balkan War.
- 1916 – The United States Senate confirms the appointment of Louis Brandeis to the United States Supreme Court, making him the first Jew to be an Associate Justice.
- 1918 – World War I: Western Front: Battle of Belleau Wood: Allied Forces under John J. Pershing and James Harbord engage Imperial German Forces under Wilhelm, German Crown Prince.
- 1919 – Prohibition comes into force in Finland.
- 1922 – The Royal Ulster Constabulary is founded.
- 1929 – The 1st Conference of the Communist Parties of Latin America is held in Buenos Aires.
- 1939 – First flight of the German Focke-Wulf Fw 190 fighter aircraft.
- 1941 – World War II: The Battle of Crete ends as Crete capitulates to Germany.
- 1941 – The Farhud, a massive pogrom in Iraq, starts and as a result, many Iraqi Jews are forced to leave their homes.
- 1943 – BOAC Flight 777 is shot down over the Bay of Biscay by German Junkers Ju 88s, killing British actor Leslie Howard and leading to speculation that it was actually an attempt to kill British Prime Minister Winston Churchill.
- 1946 – Ion Antonescu, "Conducator" ("Leader") of Romania during World War II, is executed.
- 1950 – The Declaration of Conscience speech, by U.S. Senator from Maine, Margaret Chase Smith, is delivered in response to Joseph R. McCarthy's speech at Wheeling, West Virginia.
- 1950 – The Chinchaga fire ignites. By September, it would become the largest single fire on record in North America.
- 1951 – Washington State Ferries, the largest ferry system in the United States, begins operation under state ownership after a buyout of the Puget Sound Navigation Company.
- 1958 – Charles de Gaulle comes out of retirement to lead France by decree for six months.
- 1961 – The Canadian Bank of Commerce and Imperial Bank of Canada merge to form the Canadian Imperial Bank of Commerce, the largest bank merger in Canadian history.
- 1962 – Adolf Eichmann, former SS officer in Nazi Germany, is hanged in Israel for having committed crimes against humanity, war crimes, and other offenses.
- 1974 – The Heimlich maneuver for rescuing choking victims is published in the journal Emergency Medicine.
- 1975 – The Patriotic Union of Kurdistan was founded by Jalal Talabani, Nawshirwan Mustafa, Fuad Masum and others.
- 1976 – Aeroflot Flight 418 crashes in Bioko, Equatorial Guinea, killing 46.
- 1978 – The first international applications under the Patent Cooperation Treaty are filed.
- 1979 – The first black-led government of Rhodesia (now Zimbabwe) in 90 years takes power.
- 1980 – Cable News Network (CNN) begins broadcasting.
- 1988 – The Intermediate-Range Nuclear Forces Treaty comes into effect.
- 1990 – Cold War: George H. W. Bush and Mikhail Gorbachev sign a treaty to end chemical weapon production.
- 1993 – Dobrinja mortar attack: Thirteen are killed and 133 wounded when Serb mortar shells are fired at a soccer game in Dobrinja, west of Sarajevo.
- 1994 – Republic of South Africa becomes a republic in the Commonwealth of Nations.
- 1999 – American Airlines Flight 1420 slides and crashes while landing at Little Rock National Airport, killing 11 people on a flight from Dallas to Little Rock.
- 2001 – Nepalese royal massacre: Crown Prince Dipendra of Nepal shoots and kills several members of his family including his father and mother.
- 2001 – Dolphinarium discotheque massacre: A Hamas suicide bomber kills 21 at a disco in Tel Aviv.
- 2004 – Oklahoma City bombing co-conspirator Terry Nichols is sentenced to 161 consecutive life terms without the possibility of parole.
- 2007 – Cyclone Gonu develops from an area of convection in the Arabian Sea, becoming the worst recorded natural disaster in Oman.
- 2008 – A fire on the back lot of Universal Studios breaks out, destroying the attraction King Kong Encounter and a large archive of master tapes for music and film, the full extent of which was not revealed until 2019.
- 2009 – Air France Flight 447 crashes into the Atlantic Ocean off the coast of Brazil on a flight from Rio de Janeiro to Paris. All 228 passengers and crew are killed.
- 2009 – General Motors files for Chapter 11 bankruptcy. It is the fourth largest United States bankruptcy in history.
- 2011 – A rare tornado outbreak occurs in New England; a strong EF3 tornado strikes Springfield, Massachusetts, during the event, killing four people.
- 2011 – Space Shuttle Endeavour makes its final landing after 25 flights.
- 2015 – A ship carrying 458 people capsizes in the Yangtze river in China's Hubei province, killing 442 people.

== Births ==
=== Pre-1600 ===
- 1134 – Geoffrey, Count of Nantes (died 1158)
- 1300 – Thomas of Brotherton, 1st Earl of Norfolk, English politician, Lord Marshal of England (died 1338)
- 1451 – Giles Daubeney, 1st Baron Daubeney (died 1508)
- 1460 – Enno I, Count of East Frisia, German noble (died 1491)
- 1480 – Tiedemann Giese, Polish bishop (died 1550)
- 1498 – Maarten van Heemskerck, Dutch painter (died 1574)
- 1522 – Dirck Coornhert, Dutch writer and scholar (died 1590)
- 1563 – Robert Cecil, 1st Earl of Salisbury, English politician, Secretary of State for England (died 1612)

=== 1601–1900 ===
- 1612 – Frans Post, Dutch painter (died 1680)
- 1633 – Geminiano Montanari, Italian astronomer and academic (died 1687)
- 1637 – Jacques Marquette, French missionary and explorer (died 1675)
- 1653 – Georg Muffat, French organist and composer (died 1704)
- 1675 – Francesco Scipione, marchese di Maffei, Italian archaeologist and playwright (died 1755)
- 1762 – Edmund Ignatius Rice, Irish priest and missionary, founded the Irish Christian Brothers (died 1844)
- 1765 – Christiane Vulpius, mistress and wife of Johann Wolfgang Goethe (died 1816)
- 1770 – Friedrich Laun, German author (died 1849)
- 1790 – Ferdinand Raimund, Austrian actor and playwright (died 1836)
- 1796 – Nicolas Léonard Sadi Carnot, French physicist and engineer (died 1832)
- 1800 – Edward Deas Thomson, Australian educator and politician, Chief Secretary of New South Wales (died 1879)
- 1801 – Brigham Young, American religious leader, 2nd President of The Church of Jesus Christ of Latter-day Saints (died 1877)
- 1804 – Mikhail Glinka, Russian composer (died 1857)
- 1808 – Henry Parker, English-Australian politician, 3rd Premier of New South Wales (died 1881)
- 1815 – Otto of Greece (died 1862)
- 1819 – Francis V, Duke of Modena (died 1875)
- 1822 – Clementina Maude, Viscountess Hawarden, English portrait photographer (died 1865)
- 1825 – John Hunt Morgan, American general (died 1864)
- 1831 – John Bell Hood, American general (died 1879)
- 1833 – John Marshall Harlan, American lawyer, associate justice of the U.S. Supreme Court, and politician; Attorney General of Kentucky (died 1911)
- 1843 – Henry Faulds, Scottish physician and missionary, developed fingerprinting (died 1930)
- 1869 – Richard Wünsch, German philologist (died 1915)
- 1873 – Elena Alistar, Bessarabian politician (died 1955)
- 1874 – Yury Nikolaevich Voronov, Russian botanist (died 1931)
- 1878 – John Masefield, English author and poet (died 1967)
- 1878 – Sam Dreben, American soldier and mercenary (died 1925)
- 1879 – Max Emmerich, American triathlete and gymnast (died 1956)
- 1887 – Clive Brook, English actor (died 1974)
- 1889 – Charles Kay Ogden, English linguist and philosopher (died 1957)
- 1890 – Frank Morgan, American actor (died 1949)
- 1892 – Amanullah Khan, sovereign of the Kingdom of Afghanistan, (died 1960)
- 1896 – Sydney Kyte, British bandleader (died 1981)

=== 1901–present ===
- 1901 – Hap Day, Canadian ice hockey player, referee, and manager (died 1990)
- 1901 – Tom Gorman, Australian rugby league player (died 1978)
- 1901 – John Van Druten, English-American playwright and director (died 1957)
- 1903 – Vasyl Velychkovsky, Ukrainian-Canadian bishop and martyr (died 1973)
- 1903 – Hans Vogt, Norwegian linguist and academic (died 1986)
- 1905 – Robert Newton, English-American actor (died 1956)
- 1907 – Jan Patočka, Czech philosopher (died 1977)
- 1907 – Frank Whittle, English airman and engineer, developed the jet engine (died 1996)
- 1909 – Yechezkel Kutscher, Slovak-Israeli philologist and linguist (died 1971)
- 1910 – Gyula Kállai, Hungarian communist leader, Chairman of the Council of Ministers of the People's Republic of Hungary (died 1996)
- 1912 – Herbert Tichy, Austrian geologist, author, and mountaineer (died 1987)
- 1913 – Bill Deedes, English journalist and politician (died 2007)
- 1915 – John Randolph, American actor (died 2004)
- 1917 – William Standish Knowles, American chemist and academic, Nobel Prize laureate (died 2012)
- 1920 – Robert Clarke, American actor and producer (died 2005)
- 1921 – Nelson Riddle, American composer and bandleader (died 1985)
- 1922 – Joan Caulfield, American model and actress (died 1991)
- 1922 – Povel Ramel, Swedish singer-songwriter and pianist (died 2007)
- 1924 – William Sloane Coffin, American minister and activist (died 2006)
- 1925 – Dilia Díaz Cisneros, Venezuelan teacher (died 2017)
- 1926 – Johnny Berry, English footballer (died 1994)
- 1926 – Andy Griffith, American actor, singer, producer, and screenwriter (died 2012)
- 1926 – Marilyn Monroe, American model and actress (died 1962)
- 1926 – George Robb, English international footballer and teacher (died 2011)
- 1926 – Richard Schweiker, American soldier and politician, 14th United States Secretary of Health and Human Services (died 2015)
- 1928 – Georgy Dobrovolsky, Soviet Ukrainian pilot and astronaut (died 1971)
- 1928 – Steve Dodd, Australian actor and composer (died 2014)
- 1928 – Bob Monkhouse, English actor and screenwriter (died 2003)
- 1928 – K. W. Lee, American journalist (died 2025)
- 1929 – Nargis, Indian actress (died 1981)
- 1929 – James H. Billington, American academic and Thirteenth Librarian of Congress (died 2018)
- 1930 – Matt Poore, New Zealand cricketer (died 2020)
- 1930 – Edward Woodward, English actor (died 2009)
- 1931 – Walter Horak, Austrian footballer (died 2019)
- 1932 – Frank Cameron, New Zealand cricketer (died 2023)
- 1932 – Christopher Lasch, American historian and critic (died 1994)
- 1933 – Haruo Remeliik, Palauan politician, 1st President of Palau (died 1985)
- 1934 – Pat Boone, American singer-songwriter and actor
- 1934 – Peter Masterson, American actor, director, producer and screenwriter (died 2018)
- 1934 – Doris Buchanan Smith, American author (died 2002)
- 1935 – Norman Foster, Baron Foster of Thames Bank, English architect, founded Foster and Partners
- 1935 – Reverend Ike, American minister and television host (died 2009)
- 1935 – Jack Kralick, American baseball player (died 2012)
- 1935 – John C. Reynolds, American computer scientist and academic (died 2013)
- 1936 – Anatoly Albul, Soviet and Russian wrestler (died 2013)
- 1936 – André Bourbeau, Canadian politician (died 2018)
- 1936 – Bekim Fehmiu, Bosnian actor (died 2010)
- 1936 – Gerald Scarfe, English illustrator and animator
- 1937 – Morgan Freeman, American actor and producer
- 1937 – Rosaleen Linehan, Irish actress
- 1937 – Colleen McCullough, Australian neuroscientist and author (died 2015)
- 1939 – Cleavon Little, American actor and comedian (died 1992)
- 1940 – René Auberjonois, American actor (died 2019)
- 1940 – Katerina Gogou, Greek writer and actress (died 1993)
- 1940 – Kip Thorne, American physicist, astronomer, and academic
- 1941 – Dean Chance, American baseball player and manager (died 2015)
- 1941 – Toyo Ito, Japanese architect, designed the Torre Realia BCN and Hotel Porta Fira
- 1941 – Alexander V. Zakharov, Russian physicist and astronomer
- 1942 – Parveen Kumar, Pakistani-English physician and academic
- 1943 – Orietta Berti, Italian singer and actress
- 1943 – Richard Goode, American pianist
- 1943 – Lorrie Wilmot, South African cricketer (died 2004)
- 1944 – Colin Blakemore, British neurobiologist (died 2022)
- 1944 – Robert Powell, English actor
- 1945 – Linda Scott, American singer
- 1945 – Lydia Shum, Chinese-Hong Kong actress (died 2008)
- 1945 – Frederica von Stade, American soprano and actress
- 1946 – Brian Cox, Scottish actor
- 1947 – Ron Dennis, English businessman, founded the McLaren Group
- 1947 – Jonathan Pryce, Welsh actor
- 1947 – Ronnie Wood, English guitarist, songwriter, and producer
- 1948 – Powers Boothe, American actor (died 2017)
- 1948 – Tomáš Halík, Czech Roman Catholic priest, philosopher, theologian and scholar
- 1948 – Michel Plasse, Canadian ice hockey player (died 2006)
- 1950 – Perrin Beatty, Canadian businessman and politician
- 1950 – Charlene, American singer-songwriter
- 1950 – Jean Lambert, English educator and politician
- 1950 – Michael McDowell, American author and screenwriter (died 1999)
- 1952 – Şenol Güneş, Turkish footballer and manager
- 1952 – Mihaela Loghin, Romanian shot putter
- 1953 – Ronnie Dunn, American singer-songwriter and guitarist
- 1953 – Ted Field, American entrepreneur and race car driver
- 1953 – David Berkowitz, American serial killer and arsonist
- 1954 – Jill Black, Lady Black of Derwent, English lawyer and judge
- 1955 – Chiyonofuji Mitsugu, Japanese sumo wrestler (died 2016)
- 1955 – Lorraine Moller, New Zealand runner
- 1955 – Tony Snow, American journalist, 26th White House Press Secretary (died 2008)
- 1956 – Patrick Besson, French writer and journalist
- 1956 – Petra Morsbach, German author
- 1956 – Lisa Hartman Black, American actress
- 1957 – Jeff Hawkins, American neuroscientist and engineer
- 1958 – Nambaryn Enkhbayar, Mongolian lawyer and politician, 3rd President of Mongolia
- 1958 – Gennadiy Valyukevich, Belarusian triple jumper (died 2019)
- 1959 – Martin Brundle, English racing driver and sportscaster
- 1959 – Alan Wilder, English singer-songwriter, keyboard player, and producer
- 1960 – Simon Gallup, English musician
- 1960 – Vladimir Krutov, Russian ice hockey player and coach (died 2012)
- 1960 – Sergey Kuznetsov, Russian footballer and manager
- 1960 – Giorgos Lillikas, Cypriot politician, 8th Cypriot Minister of Foreign Affairs
- 1960 – Lucy McBath, American politician
- 1960 – Elena Mukhina, Russian gymnast (died 2006)
- 1961 – Paul Coffey, Canadian ice hockey player
- 1961 – Mark Curry, American actor
- 1961 – Werner Günthör, Swiss shot putter and bobsledder
- 1961 – John Huston, American golfer
- 1961 – Peter Machajdík, Slovak-German pianist and composer
- 1961 – Yevgeny Prigozhin, Russian oligarch, mercenary chief and restaurateur (died 2023)
- 1963 – Vital Borkelmans, Belgian footballer
- 1963 – Miles J. Padgett, Scottish physicist and academic
- 1963 – David Rudman, American puppeteer ("Sesame Street", "The Muppets")
- 1963 – David Westhead, English actor and producer
- 1965 – Larisa Lazutina, Russian skier
- 1965 – Olga Nazarova, Russian sprinter
- 1965 – Nigel Short, English chess grandmaster
- 1966 – Greg Schiano, American football player and coach
- 1968 – Jason Donovan, Australian actor and singer
- 1968 – Mathias Rust, German aviator
- 1969 – Luis García Postigo, Mexican footballer
- 1969 – Teri Polo, American actress
- 1970 – Alexi Lalas, American soccer player, manager, and sportscaster
- 1970 – Alison Hinds, British-Barbadian soca singer
- 1971 – Mario Cimarro, Cuban-American actor and singer
- 1973 – Frédérik Deburghgraeve, Belgian swimmer
- 1973 – Adam Garcia, Australian actor
- 1973 – Heidi Klum, German-American model, fashion designer, and producer
- 1973 – Derek Lowe, American baseball player
- 1974 – Alanis Morissette, Canadian-American singer-songwriter, guitarist, producer, and actress
- 1974 – Michael Rasmussen, Danish cyclist
- 1974 – Sarah Teather, English politician
- 1975 – Michal Grošek, Czech-Swiss ice hockey player and coach
- 1975 – Frauke Petry, German politician
- 1976 – Marlon Devonish, English sprinter and coach
- 1977 – Arsen Gitinov, Russian and Kyrgyzstani freestyle wrestler
- 1977 – Danielle Harris, American actress
- 1977 – Brad Wilkerson, American baseball player and coach
- 1977 – Sarah Wayne Callies, American actress
- 1978 – Antonietta Di Martino, Italian high jumper
- 1979 – Santana Moss, American football player
- 1979 – Markus Persson, Swedish game designer, founded Mojang
- 1981 – Brandi Carlile, American singer-songwriter and guitarist
- 1981 – Amy Schumer, American comedian and actress
- 1981 – Carlos Zambrano, Venezuelan baseball player
- 1981 – Aleksei Mikhailovich Uvarov, Russian footballer
- 1982 – Justine Henin, Belgian tennis player
- 1984 – Jean Beausejour, Chilean footballer
- 1984 – Olivier Tielemans, Dutch racing driver
- 1984 – Nikki Glaser, American comedian
- 1985 – Dinesh Karthik, Indian cricketer
- 1985 – Nick Young, American basketball player
- 1985 – Sam Young, American basketball player
- 1986 – Moses Ndiema Masai, Kenyan runner
- 1986 – Chinedu Obasi, Nigerian footballer
- 1986 – Ben Smith, New Zealand rugby player
- 1987 – Zoltán Harsányi, Slovak footballer
- 1987 – Yarisley Silva, Cuban pole vaulter
- 1988 – Javier Hernández, Mexican footballer
- 1989 – Nataliya Goncharova, Ukrainian/Russian volleyball player
- 1989 – Sammy Alex Mutahi, Kenyan runner
- 1990 – Miller Bolaños, Ecuadoran footballer
- 1990 – Carlota Ciganda, Spanish golfer
- 1990 – Roman Josi, Swiss ice hockey player
- 1991 – Zazie Beetz, German-American actress
- 1991 – Tyrone Roberts, Australian rugby league player
- 1994 – Kagayaki Taishi, Japanese sumo wrestler
- 1996 – Edvinas Gertmonas, Lithuanian footballer
- 1996 – Tom Holland, English actor
- 1999 – Technoblade, American YouTuber and streamer (died 2022)
- 1999 – Dmytro Udovychenko, Ukrainian violinist

== Deaths ==
=== Pre-1600 ===
- 195 BC – Emperor Gaozu of Han (born 256 BC)
- 193 – Marcus Didius Julianus, Roman Emperor (born 133)
- 352 – Ran Min, Emperor of Ran Wei during the Sixteen Kingdoms
- 654 – Pyrrhus, patriarch of Constantinople
- 829 – Li Tongjie, general of the Tang Dynasty
- 847 – Xiao, empress of the Tang Dynasty
- 896 – Theodosius Romanus, Syriac Orthodox patriarch of Antioch
- 932 – Thietmar, duke of Saxony
- 1146 – Ermengarde of Anjou, Duchess regent of Brittany (born 1068)
- 1186 – Minamoto no Yukiie, Japanese warlord
- 1220 – Henry de Bohun, 1st Earl of Hereford (born 1176)
- 1310 – Marguerite Porete, French mystic
- 1354 – Kitabatake Chikafusa (born 1293)
- 1434 – King Wladislaus II of Poland
- 1449 – Polissena Sforza, Lady of Rimini (born 1428)
- 1571 – John Story, English martyr (born 1504)

=== 1601–1900 ===
- 1616 – Tokugawa Ieyasu, Japanese shogun (born 1543)
- 1625 – Honoré d'Urfé, French author and poet (born 1568)
- 1639 – Melchior Franck, German composer (born 1579)
- 1660 – Mary Dyer, English-American martyr (born 1611)
- 1662 – Zhu Youlang, Chinese emperor (born 1623)
- 1681 – Cornelis Saftleven, Dutch genre painter (born 1607)
- 1710 – David Mitchell, Scottish admiral and politician (born 1642)
- 1740 – Samuel Werenfels, Swiss theologian (born 1657)
- 1769 – Edward Holyoke, American pastor and academic (born 1689)
- 1773 – Wolraad Woltemade, South African folk hero (born 1708)
- 1795 – Pierre-Joseph Desault, French anatomist and surgeon (born 1744)
- 1815 – Louis-Alexandre Berthier, French general and politician, French Minister of War (born 1753)
- 1823 – Louis-Nicolas Davout, French general and politician, French Minister of War (born 1770)
- 1826 – J. F. Oberlin, French pastor and philanthropist (born 1740)
- 1830 – Swaminarayan, Indian religious leader (born 1781)
- 1832 – Jean Maximilien Lamarque, French general and politician (born 1770)
- 1833 – Oliver Wolcott Jr., American lawyer and politician, 2nd United States Secretary of the Treasury, 24th Governor of Connecticut (born 1760)
- 1841 – David Wilkie, Scottish painter and academic (born 1785)
- 1846 – Pope Gregory XVI (born 1765)
- 1861 – John Quincy Marr, American captain (born 1825)
- 1864 – Hong Xiuquan, Chinese rebel, led the Taiping Rebellion (born 1812)
- 1868 – James Buchanan, American lawyer and politician, 15th President of the United States (born 1791)
- 1872 – James Gordon Bennett, Sr., American publisher, founded the New York Herald (born 1795)
- 1873 – Joseph Howe, Canadian journalist and politician, 5th Premier of Nova Scotia (born 1804)
- 1876 – Hristo Botev, Bulgarian poet and journalist (born 1848)
- 1879 – Napoléon, Prince Imperial of France (born 1856)

=== 1901–present ===
- 1908 – Allen Butler Talcott, American painter (born 1867)
- 1925 – Thomas R. Marshall, American politician, 28th Vice President of the United States (born 1854)
- 1927 – Lizzie Borden, American accused murderer (born 1860)
- 1927 – J. B. Bury, Irish historian, philologist, and scholar (born 1861)
- 1934 – Sir Alfred Rawlinson, 3rd Baronet, English colonel and polo player (born 1867)
- 1935 – Arthur Arz von Straußenburg, Romanian-Hungarian general (born 1857)
- 1938 – Ödön von Horváth, Croatian-French author and playwright (born 1901)
- 1941 – Hans Berger, German neurologist and academic (born 1873)
- 1941 – Hugh Walpole, New Zealand-English author (born 1884)
- 1943 – Leslie Howard, English actor, director, and producer (born 1893)
- 1943 – Wilfrid Israel, English-German businessman and philanthropist (born 1899)
- 1946 – Ion Antonescu, Romanian marshal and politician, 43rd Prime Minister of Romania (born 1882)
- 1948 – Alex Gard, Russian-American cartoonist (born 1900)
- 1952 – John Dewey, American psychologist and philosopher (born 1859)
- 1953 – Emanuel Vidović, Croatian painter and illustrator (born 1870)
- 1954 – Martin Andersen Nexø, Danish-German journalist and author (born 1869)
- 1960 – Lester Patrick, Canadian ice hockey player and coach (born 1883)
- 1960 – Paula Hitler, German-Austrian sister of Adolf Hitler (born 1896)
- 1962 – Adolf Eichmann, German Nazi SS-Obersturmbannführer, key organizer of the Holocaust (born 1906)
- 1963 – Walter Lee, Australian politician, 24th Premier of Tasmania (born 1874)
- 1965 – Curly Lambeau, American football player and coach, founded the Green Bay Packers (born 1898)
- 1966 – Papa Jack Laine, American drummer and bandleader (born 1873)
- 1968 – Helen Keller, American author and activist (born 1880)
- 1968 – André Laurendeau, Canadian playwright, journalist, and politician (born 1912)
- 1969 – Ivar Ballangrud, Norwegian speed skater (born 1904)
- 1971 – Reinhold Niebuhr, American theologian and academic (born 1892)
- 1979 – Werner Forssmann, German physician and academic, Nobel Prize laureate (born 1904)
- 1980 – Arthur Nielsen, American businessman, founded the ACNielsen company (born 1897)
- 1981 – Carl Vinson, American lawyer and politician (born 1883)
- 1983 – Prince Charles, Count of Flanders (born 1903)
- 1983 – Anna Seghers, German writer (born 1900)
- 1985 – Richard Greene, English actor and soldier (born 1918)
- 1986 – Jo Gartner, Austrian racing driver (born 1958)
- 1987 – Rashid Karami, Lebanese lawyer and politician, 32nd Prime Minister of Lebanon (born 1921)
- 1988 – Herbert Feigl, Austrian philosopher from the Vienna Circle (born 1902)
- 1989 – Aurelio Lampredi, Italian engineer, designed the Ferrari Lampredi engine (born 1917)
- 1991 – David Ruffin, American singer-songwriter (born 1941)
- 1996 – Neelam Sanjiva Reddy, Indian politician, 6th President of India (born 1913)
- 1999 – Christopher Cockerell, English engineer, invented the hovercraft (born 1910)
- 2000 – Tito Puente, American drummer, composer, and producer (born 1923)
- 2001 – Hank Ketcham, American cartoonist, created Dennis the Menace (born 1920)
- 2001 – notable victims of the Nepalese royal massacre
  - Aishwarya of Nepal (born 1949)
  - Birendra of Nepal (born 1945)
  - Dhirendra of Nepal (born 1950)
  - Prince Nirajan of Nepal (born 1978)
  - Princess Shruti of Nepal (born 1976)
- 2002 – Hansie Cronje, South African cricketer (born 1969)
- 2004 – William Manchester, American historian and author (born 1922)
- 2005 – Hilda Crosby Standish, American physician (born 1902)
- 2005 – George Mikan, American basketball player and coach (born 1924)
- 2007 – Tony Thompson, American singer and songwriter (born 1975)
- 2008 – Tommy Lapid, Israeli journalist and politician, 17th Justice Minister of Israel (born 1931)
- 2008 – Yves Saint Laurent, French fashion designer, founded Saint Laurent Paris (born 1936)
- 2009 – Vincent O'Brien, Irish horse trainer (born 1917)
- 2010 – Kazuo Ohno, Japanese dancer (born 1906)
- 2010 – Andrei Voznesensky, Russian poet (born 1933)
- 2011 – Haleh Sahabi, Iranian humanitarian and activist (born 1957)
- 2012 – Faruq Z. Bey, American saxophonist and composer (born 1942)
- 2012 – Pádraig Faulkner, Irish educator and politician, 19th Irish Minister of Defence (born 1918)
- 2012 – Milan Gaľa, Slovak politician (born 1953)
- 2013 – James Kelleher, Canadian lawyer and politician, 33rd Solicitor General of Canada (born 1930)
- 2014 – Ann B. Davis, American actress (born 1926)
- 2014 – Valentin Mankin, Ukrainian sailor (born 1938)
- 2014 – Timofei Moșneaga, Moldovan physician and politician, Moldovan Minister of Health (born 1932)
- 2015 – Charles Kennedy, Scottish journalist and politician (born 1959)
- 2015 – Joan Kirner, Australian educator and politician, 42nd Premier of Victoria (born 1938)
- 2015 – Nicholas Liverpool, Dominican lawyer and politician, 6th President of Dominica (born 1934)
- 2015 – Jacques Parizeau, Canadian economist and politician, 26th Premier of Quebec (born 1930)
- 2015 – Jean Ritchie, American singer-songwriter (born 1922)
- 2019 – Ani Yudhoyono, Indonesian politician, 6th First Lady of Indonesia. (born 1952)
- 2024 – Tin Oo, Burmese general and politician (born 1927)
- 2025 – Jonathan Joss, American actor (born 1965)

== Holidays and observances ==
- Children's Day (International), and its related observances:
  - The Day of Protection of Children Rights (Armenia)
  - Mothers' and Children's Day (Mongolia)
- Christian feast day:
  - Blessed Alfonso Navarrete
  - Annibale Maria di Francia
  - Crescentinus
  - Fortunatus of Spoleto
  - Herculanus of Piegaro
  - Íñigo of Oña
  - Blessed John Story
  - Justin Martyr (Roman Catholic, Eastern Orthodox, Anglican, Lutheran)
  - Ronan of Locronan
  - Pamphilus of Caesarea (Roman Catholic only)
  - June 1 (Eastern Orthodox liturgics)
- Gawai Dayak, harvest festival in the state of Sarawak (Malaysia)
- Global Day of Parents (International)
- Independence Day, celebrates the independence of Samoa from New Zealand in 1962.
- Madaraka Day (Kenya)
- National Maritime Day (Mexico)
- National Tree Planting Day (Cambodia)
- Pancasila Day (Indonesia)
- President's Day (Palau)
- The beginning of Crop over, celebrated until the first Monday of August. (Barbados)
- Victory Day (Tunisia)
- World Milk Day (International)
- National Technology Day (Libya)
