= National Information Security and Safety Authority (Libya) =

- الهيئة الوطنية لأمن وسلامة المعلومات
- Nickname: NISSA

The National Information Security and Safety Authority (NISSA) is a Libyan government authority responsible for cybersecurity and information security policy in Libya. The authority has legal personality and financial independence and is headquartered in Tripoli, Libya. It is responsible for developing national cybersecurity policies and standards and for protecting Libya’s information and communications infrastructure from digital threats and cyber risks.

== History ==
The authority was established by Libyan Council of Ministers Decision No. 28 of 2013. It was created as an institutional upgrade of the former Information Security and Safety Department within the Ministry of Communications. Following the decision, the department was transformed into an independent national authority affiliated with the Prime Minister’s Office and tasked with coordinating cybersecurity protection at the national level.

== Functions ==
According to its founding mandate, the authority is responsible for several strategic and operational functions, including:

- Cybersecurity policy development – Developing the national cybersecurity strategy and setting information security policies and standards.
- Infrastructure protection – Securing critical government and private-sector networks and systems from cyber threats.
- Incident response – Managing the national computer emergency response team (Libya-CERT) to respond to cybersecurity incidents.
- Audit and compliance – Evaluating and reviewing networks and information systems and issuing compliance certifications with national security standards.
- Awareness and capacity building – Promoting cybersecurity awareness among institutions and the general public.
- Licensing – Authorizing companies that import or provide cybersecurity equipment and solutions.

== Services ==
The authority provides services to both public and private sectors, including:

- Cybersecurity solutions and consultancy, including firewalls and intrusion detection systems.
- Research and studies aimed at improving national information security capabilities.
- Network monitoring and analysis to detect vulnerabilities and cyber threats.

== See also ==
- Telecommunications in Libya
- Information security
- Libyan Technology Foundation
