= Sabine Hornig =

German visual artist and photographer

- Born: June 5th
- Movement: Photography
- Website: https://sabine-hornig.de

Sabine Hornig (born 1964, West Germany) is a German visual artist and photographer who lives and works in Berlin. Her work in photography, sculpture, and site-specific installation art is known for her interpretations of modernist architecture and contemporary urban life. Her work has appeared in solo exhibitions throughout the world, including Double Transparency at Art Unlimited Basel in Switzerland (2014) and Projects 78 at the Museum of Modern Art in New York (2003), and in numerous group exhibitions at institutions like the J.Paul Getty Museum in Los Angeles and ICA London.

Hornig's work is included in the collections of the Solomon R. Guggenheim Museum in New York, the Baltimore Museum of Art, the Museum of Modern Art (MoMA) in New York, the Los Angeles County Museum of Art (LACMA), the Cleveland Clinic, Hirshorn Museum and Sculpture Garden in Washington, DC, Pinakothek der Moderne in Munich, and Malmö Konstmuseet in Sweden.

== Education ==
Hornig studied sculpture and photography at the Hochschule der Künste (since 2001 the Universität der Künste Berlin, UdK (Berlin University of the Arts)), in Berlin from 1986 to 1992 receiving a BFA and an MFA.

== Work ==
Hornig's work plays with and challenges the way in which human beings perceive the world around them, blurring scale and perspective. Many of her works combine photographs and three-dimensional structures, often creating a tromp l’œil effect. These stretch the boundaries of what would commonly be considered “photography” or “sculpture” and do not fit easily into any single categorization. Hornig's work is frequently described as incorporating a philosophy of Minimalism, frequently incorporating windows or doors that frame barren city landscapes as well as the viewer's own image reflected in the object's surface. The artist, however, has stated that she does not find that Minimalist description wholly accurate or appropriate.

Hornig's art considers the built environment and incorporates everyday architectural elements like doors, walls, and windows, as well as industrial materials such as concrete. These appear in both sculpture and site-specific installations. One 2002 sculptural work, Balcony, installed a full stucco balcony – complete with a drying towel – floating above the floor in a gallery. In a 2005 Lisbon exhibition, Hornig created a “stone” wall out of newspaper and glue, extending along and reflecting in a glass gallery wall of windows. One major site-specific work is the Glass Façade Project, or Das Glasfassaden-Projekt, which in 2005 provided a large installation for an elementary school building at Pfeuferstraße 1, in Munich's Sendling district. The project features silkscreen printed with transparent colors on safety glass. Brightly colored balloons, bookshelves, and seemingly billowing white sheets appear on the façade of the urban school. The silkscreened images are visible from inside the glass façade and outside of it. In certain works that incorporate architectural elements, she simplifies and omits details like door handles and adjusts an item's scale in order to transform a recognizable object into a sculpture.

Windows are another common motif in Hornig's art, appearing in major installations like her 2003 work at MoMA Queens, Projects 78, with photographs of urban or outdoor spaces frequently appearing embedded within solid window or doorframes. She has created an ongoing Windows series since 2001, utilizing photographs of and through windows. In some of these works the empty windows, and the empty storefronts viewed through the window frame, reflect potential for change and provide an opportunity for reflection. Referring to arthistory tradition her photographs often have a room description in the title as in Der zerstörte Raum from 2005, that refers to Jeff Wall's slide called The Destroyed Room from 1978.

Her 2013 exhibition at the Tanya Bonakdar Gallery in New York, called Transparent Things, took its title from a 1972 novel by Vladimir Nabokov and explored themes of temporality and urban spaces. The exhibition combined sculptural pieces, mimicking industrial urban objects and made out of materials like concrete, polyester, and aluminum, with photographs depicting run-down spaces in modern Berlin. Both the structures and the photographs subvert viewers’ visual understanding of the objects and the physical space. Nearly all of the photographs are captured through windows, in a manner that compresses and distorts depth perception and sense of place, throwing viewers off-balance and creating spatial confusion that is characteristic of Hornig's work. The artist herself has said that she communicates a sense of abstraction, “placelessness,” and “indistinctness” in her work, to encourage critical thought in her viewers.

Commissioned by LaGuardia Airport, Hornig realized her largest architectural intervention to date, La Guardia Vistas (2020), running 268 feet long and 42 feet tall on the glass facade of the Terminal B passageway to the parking garage. Taking the view of Manhattan’s skyline from the airport as a conceptual departure point, she shot more than 1,100 high-resolution photographs of Manhattan from its rooftops as well as from the waterfront in Queens. She merged the images into a stacked composition punctuated with 20 quotations by and about Fiorello La Guardia.

== Exhibitions ==
=== Solo exhibitions ===
- Anlage Lichtschacht, HdK Berlin (1992)
- Ateliereinbau II, Kunst-Werke, Berlin (1992)
- Orange Fassade, Lukas + Hoffman, Köln/Cologne
- Prototype – Memory is Reconstruction, Malmö Konstmuseet, Sweden (1996)

- Wiensowski & Harbord, Berlin (1998)

- Rauhputz City, Galerie Barbara Thumm, Berlin (2000)
- Window with Curtain, Bonakdar Jancou Gallery, New York (2001)
- Balkon, Galerie Barbara Thumm, Berlin (2002)
- Out Front, Tanya Bonakdar Gallery, New York (2002)
- Fenster, Galerie Barbara Thumm, Berlin (2003)
- Projects 78, Museum of Modern Art (MoMA), New York (2003)
- Schule/School, Tanya Bonakdar Gallery, New York (2004)
- Balkong, Galeri Lars Bohman, Stockholm (2004)
- Vorhang 3, Galerie Barbara Gross, Munich (2005)
- Der zweite Raum/The Second Room, Centro Cultural de Belem, Lisbon (2005)
- Raum mit groβem Fenster/ Room with Large Window, Berlinische Galerie, Berlin (2006)
- Vorher und Nachher, Galerie Barbara Thumm (2006)
- Gebilde, Tanya Bonakdar Gallery, New York (2007)
- Landscape Negative, Cristina Guerra Contemporary Art, Lisbon, Portugal (2009)
- Die Gegenstände ziehen sich zurück, Galerie Barbara Thumm, Berlin (2009)
- Just Then, Cristina Guerra Contemporary Art, Lisbon, Portugal (2010)
- Fenster an der Karl-Marx-Allee (site-specific), Deutsche Bundesbank, Berlin (2010)
- Durchs Fenster, Pinakthek der Moderne, Munich (2011–12)
- Stillleben am Fenster, Galerie Barbara Gross, Munich (2011-2012)
- Der dunkle und der helle Raum, Kunstverein Schwäbisch Hall, Germany (2012)
- Transparent Things, Tanya Bonakdar Gallery, New York (2013)
- Double Transparency, Sensory Spaces 2 (site specific work), Boijmans van Beuningen Museum, Rotterdam, Netherlands (2013-2014)
- Sabine Hornig. Fotografien und Modelle, Drawing Room, Hamburg, Germany (2014)
- Nomadicity, Museo Nivola, Orani, Italy (2015–16)

=== Group exhibitions ===
- Installation im Rohbau, in Zusammenarbeit mit (in cooperation with) Bettina Hoffman, Doris Kuwert, Friedrichstraβe, Berlin (1990)
- heute, Künstlerhaus Bethanien, Berlin (1991)
- In Zusammenarbeit mit Isa Genzken, HdK Berlin (1991)
- Multiples, Neuer Berlin Kunstverein, Berlin (1994)
- Sammlung Volkmann/Volkmann Collection, Berlin (1994)
- Urbane Legenden Berlin, Staatliche Kunsthalle Baden-Baden (1995)
- Memento Metropolis, Turbinhallerne, Copenhagen (1996)
- Fasten Seat Belt, Galerie Krinziger, Vienna (1997)
- Take Off, Galerie Krinzinger, Bregenz (1997)
- Memento Metropolis, Antwerp (1997)
- Made in Berlin, Rhethymnon Center of Contemporary Art, Crete (1998)
- Double Vision, Nexus Art Center, Atlanta, Georgia (1999)
- Konstruktionzeichnungen, Kunst-Werke, Berlin
- Made in Berlin, House of Cyprus, Athens (1999)
- Clockwork, P.S. 1 Contemporary Art Center, Clocktower Gallery, New York (2000)
- Karl-Schmidt-Rottluff-Stipendiaten, Kunstakademie Dresden and Kunsthalle Düsseldorf (2000)
- ein/räumen, Hamburger Kunsthalle (2000)

- Berlin-London, ICA London (2001)

- Skulptur-Biennale Münsterland, Kreis Steinfurt (2001)
- New York, Tanya Bonakdar Gallery, New York (2001)
- Best of the Season: Selected Highlights from the 2000-2001 Manhattan Gallery Season, The Aldrich Museum of Contemporary Art, Ridgefield, USA (2001)
- Hortus Ludi, The Garden of Joy, Maastricht (2003)
- The invisible and the visible as an indivisible unity, Mendelssohn-Haus, Berlin (2003)
- Uma Nova Geometria, Galeria Fortes Vilaça, São Paulo (2003)
- Collección de Fotografia Contemporánea de Telefonica, Fundación Telefónica, Madrid (2004)
- Art …chitecture, EVO Gallery, Santa Fe (2004)
- Beyond Delirious, Cisneros Collection, Cisneros Fontanals Art Foundation (CIFO), Miami (2005)
- Vanishing Point, Wexner Center, Columbus, Ohio (2005)
- Post-Modellismus. Models in Art, Galerie Krinzinger, Vienna (2005)
- Collección de Fotografia Contemporánea de Telefonica, Museo de Arte Contemporánea de Vigo, Spain (2005)
- Constructing New Berlin, Phoenix Art Museum (2006)
- Constructing New Berlin, Bass Museum, Miami (2006)
- Berlin-Tokyo/Tokyo-Berlin, Neue Nationalgalerie Berlin (2006)

- Art Basel Unlimited (2006)

- Reality Bites - Making Avant-Garde Art in Post-Wall Germany, Mildred Lane Kemper Art Museum, St. Louis (2007)
- Design For Living. New works from the Frank Cohen Collection, Initial Access, Wolverhampton, UK (2007)
- Morel’s Island, Centre Photographique d’Ile de France, Pontault-Combault, France (2007)
- Urban Landscapes, ...emancipation and nostalgia, David Winton Bell Gallery at Brown University, Providence (2008)
- Die Stadt von morgen - Beiträge zu einer Archäologie des Hansaviertels Berlin, Akademie der Künste, Berlin (2007)
- Made in Germany, Sprengel Museum Hannover, Kunstverein Hannover, Kestner Gesellschaft Hannover, Germany (2007)
- INSIDE // OUTSIDE. Innenraum und Ausblick in der zeitgenössischen deutschen Fotografie, Museum Küppersmühle (MKM), Duisburg, Germany (2009-9)
- Urban Reflections, Stills Gallery, Edinburgh, UK (2008-9)
- Leichtigkeit und Enthusiasmus, Kunstmuseum Wolfsburg, Germany (2009)
- Atlantis I - Hidden Histories - New Identities, XVI. Rohkunstbau, Schloss Marquardt, Potsdam (2009)
- Contemporary Photographs from the Collection, MoMA (2009)
- Conflicting Tales, Burger Collection, Berlin (2009)
- I look at the window, Galerie Axel Obinger, Berlin (2010)
- Durchsichtige Dinge, Kunstverein Freiburg, Germany (2011)
- Insight - Outsight II, Collection Florian Peters-Messer, Städtische Galerie im Park, Viersen, Germany (2012)
- Re-Encounters, Objects and Phenomena, 601 Artspace, New York (2012)
- 30 Künstler / 30 Räume, Kunsthalle Nürnberg, Germany (2012)
- FRESH WIDOW. The Window in Art since Matisse and Duchamp, Kunstsammlung Nordrhein-Westfalen, K20, Düsseldorf, Germany (2012)
- Lost Places – Orte der Fotografie, Kunsthalle Hamburg, Germany (2012)
- At the Window. The Photographer's View, J. Paul Getty Museum, Los Angeles (2013–14)
- Vom Außenraum zum Innenraum, Kunsthaus Potsdam/Potsdam Museum, Germany (2014)
- Double Transparency, Art Unlimited Basel, with Cristina Guerra Contemporary Art, Lisbon (2014)
- S.I.L.K., Kochi-Muziris Biennale, Pepper House Residency, Kochi, India (2014–15)
- Spilled Light, Checkpoint California, Deutsche Bank KunstHalle, Berlin (2015)
- Elective Affinities (German Art since the late 1960s), Latvian National Museum of Art, Riga, Latvia (2016)

== Recognition ==
Karl Schmidt-Rottluff Stipendium (1998)

P.S. 1 International Studio Program, New York (1999-2000)

Goethe Institute (2009)

Villa Aurora, Los Angeles (2009)

== See also ==
- List of German women artists
