= Teed =

- Company type: Technological Innovation
- Industry: Educational technology
- Founded: 2008
- Headquarters: Mexico
- Number of locations: 18

Teed is a Mexican startup which creates academic software and similar technology.

== History of the company ==
Their main objective was to develop high quality technologies in order to make the country significantly more productive. etc. With mobile applications and educational software, Teed seeks to reduce the users amount of time spent on tasks, in order to maximize teaching. Throughout the years, they have created new tools that are easy to access and they serve to improve interaction with new technologies.

After eight years, Teed has positioned as the leader in software development with specialization areas in the creation of virtual platforms, electronic commerce, hosting service, consultancy, etc. This startup has also improved the way classes are given and the knowledge curve of many institutions.

Forbes and El Economista compare this company to the one created by Steve Jobs, Apple, but the difference is that they invest in education. They create new tools for the students development and the way to impart classes. They also say that this company facilitates the students methodology of learning.

== Methodology ==
Teed is based on four types of technologies. First, they create responsive technologies which principal aim is to create products that are compatible with any electronic device required by the users. They also develop dynamic technologies by creating services able to connect the user to real-time information through their software. At the same time they try to create intuitive technologies which are the ones focused on the user experience in order to optimize the interaction between the user and the application. Finally they create harmonic technologies by aesthetic interfaces with an appropriate balance between information, animations, multimedia content, etc. Those four types of technologies are the ones that made Teed a successful startup in few years.

== Project scope ==
Teed has developed many technological products in order to improve the methodology of giving class. The first one is the Teed platform, a website where the students can take different classes in financial administration, languages and history. This platform is used by Monterrey Institute of Technology and Higher Education, Universidad de las Américas Puebla and other business schools. Other significant project developed by Teed is the International Barroque Museum (Museo Internacional del Barroco). The startup developed the whole technology of the museum, which is considered the museum with highest technological level in Latin America.
