= NTD =

NTD may refer to:

== Biology and medicine ==
- N-terminal domain, a region at one end of a protein
- Neglected tropical diseases, a group of endemic infectious diseases that primarily affect the poor
- Neon tetra disease, a disease affecting tropical aquarium fish
- Neural tube defect, a group of medical conditions

== Television broadcasters ==
- NTD (Australian TV station)
- New Tang Dynasty Television

== Technology ==
- Network Termination Device, a telecommunications device
- Neutron transmutation doping, a method to make semiconductors
- Nintendo Technology Development, a subsidiary of Nintendo located in Redmond, Washington, U.S.
- Notice and take down, removal by Internet hosts of allegedly illegal material
- National Technology Day in Libya.

== Other uses ==
- National Theatre of the Deaf, a touring theatre company in the United States
- National Transit Database, the data repository of the Federal Transit Administration in the United States
- New Era for Democracy, a political party in Burkina Faso
- New Taiwan dollar, the currency of Taiwan
