= Toyo Ito Museum of Architecture, Imabari =

Coordinates: 34°12′49.78″N 132°57′1.69″E

- 今治市伊東豊雄建築ミュージアム
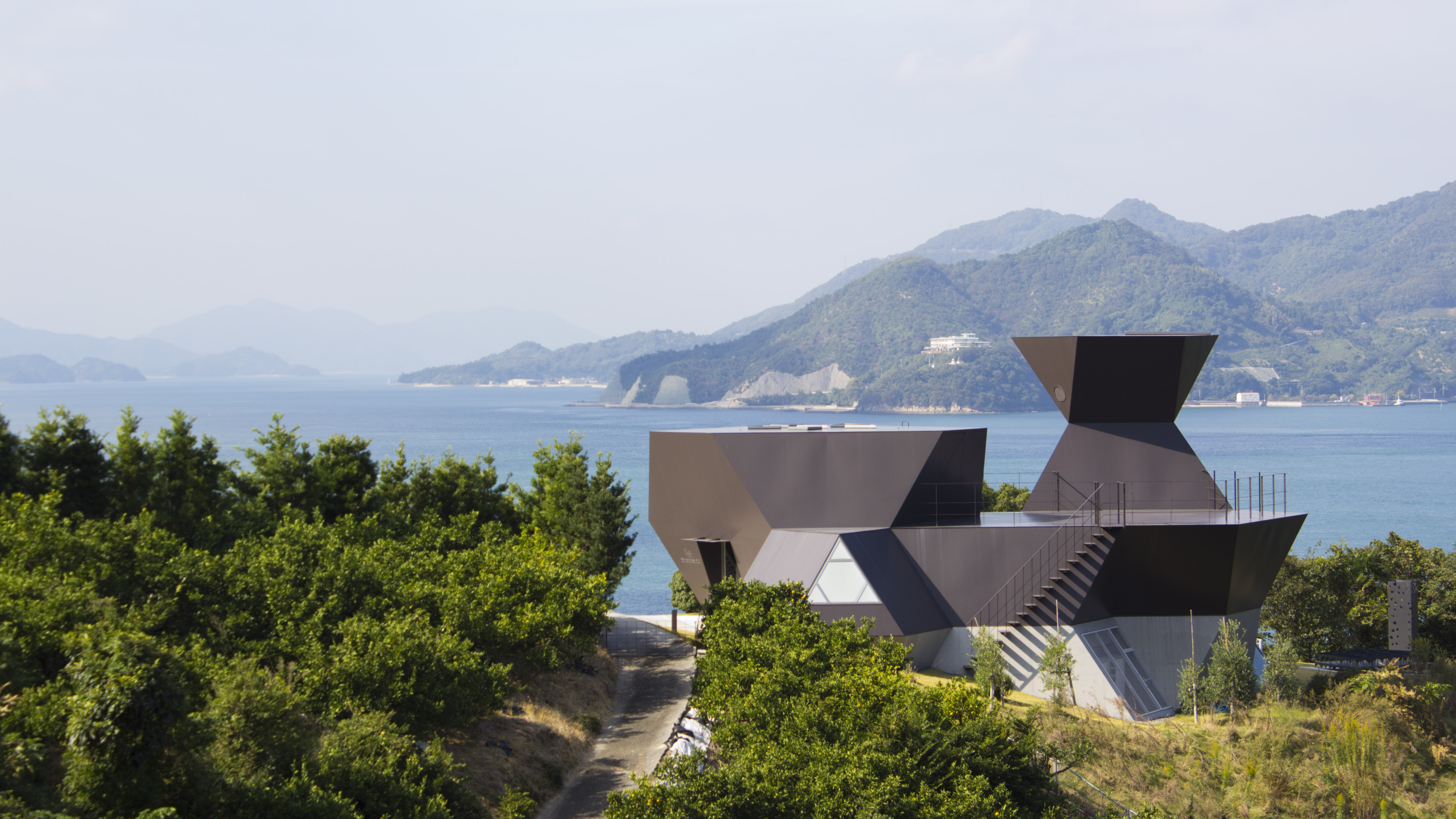
- Established: 2011
- Location: Imabari, Ehime, Japan
- Type: Architecture museum
- Website: www.tima-imabari.jp/english

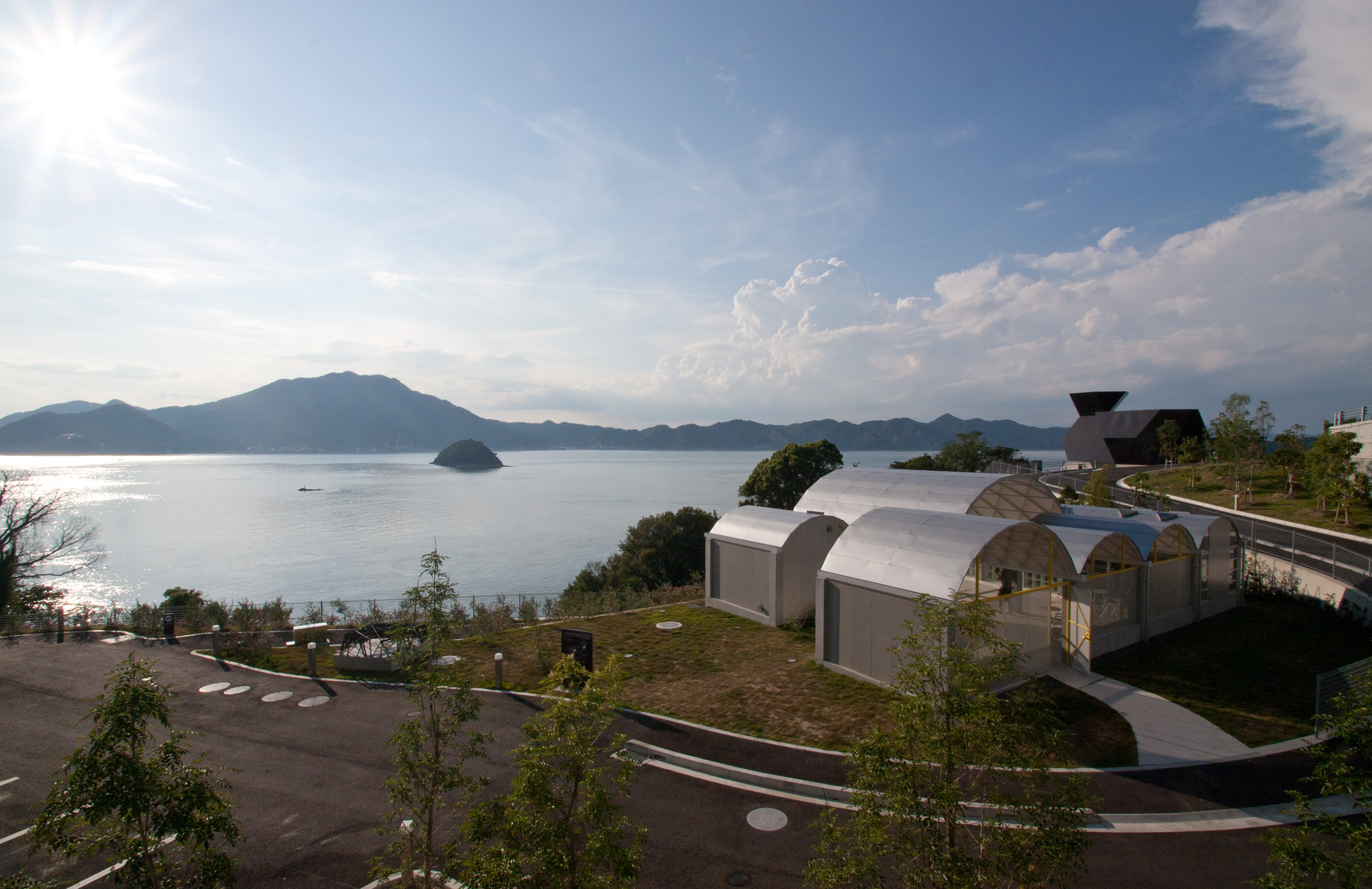
Toyo Ito Museum of Architecture Silver Hut

The Toyo Ito Museum of Architecture, Imabari (今治市伊東豊雄建築ミュージアム, Imabari-Shi Ito Toyo Kenchiku Museum) is a museum of contemporary architecture and design located in Imabari, Ehime Prefecture.

The two small museum buildings, named Steel Hut and Silver Hut, both designed by Pritzker Prize winning architect Toyo Ito, are located on a promontory on Ōmishima, a small island in the middle of the Seto Inland Sea. Opened in 2011, the museum hosts exhibits and educational programs relating both to the work of Toyo Ito, regional development and other themes in Japanese contemporary architecture.
