= White U House =

Former building in Nakano, Tokyo, Japan

- 中野本町の家
- Location within Tokyo

General information
- Location: Nakano, Tokyo, Japan, 3-14-26 Honcho, Nakano ward, Tokyo
- Coordinates: 35.69512°N 139.67558°E
- Construction started: 1976
- Demolished: 1997

Design and construction
- Architect: Toyo Ito

The White U House was a building in Nakano, Tokyo, Japan designed by Toyo Ito in 1976. The building was demolished in 1997.

Ito designed the building as a house for his older sister following the loss of her husband.

The house is one of Ito's most seminal projects.
