= National Technology Day (Libya) =

- Official name: National Information Technology Day
- Also called: NTD
- Type: National
- Date: 1 June
- Next time: 1 June 2027
- First time: 2021; 5 years ago
- Started by: Libyan Technology Foundation

National Information Technology Day, or simply National Technology Day, is a national day approved by the Government of National Unity following a proposal submitted by the Libyan Technology Foundation to the Prime Minister to make June 1st a National Information Technology Day in Libya. This day is celebrated throughout Libya on the same day and time with workshops, discussion sessions and technical lectures.

== Target audience ==
- Local public and private institutions and companies involved in technology work
- Those interested in technology blogging, website and application developers and programmers
- Owners of leading technology projects
- Legal figures with influence in technology decision-making
- Technical university students and those interested in the field working in it
- Banks and global giants are potential funders of small technology initiatives
- Robotics teams and those interested in robotics
- Video game professionals
- Technical civil society organizations and local technology initiative initiators
- Technical community leaders across Libya

== Events ==
National Day activities include technical awareness lectures, discussion sessions with experts in various technical fields, workshops, training, and exhibitions, mostly focused on technology. Volunteers from various Libyan cities register to organize the event in their cities, with the event starting in all Libyan cities on the same day and at the same time. The event is celebrated in various locations, such as colleges, schools, workspaces, and various public and private entities and companies interested in the technology field.

=== Accompanying activities ===
The National Day is accompanied by various other activities, such as:

- Developer Summit
- Tech Legislation Sessions
- Information Security Sessions
- Tech Mini Expo
- Salamat Libya
- Tech Leaders Forum
- Fintech City
