= Hotel Porta Fira =

Hotel high-rise in Spain

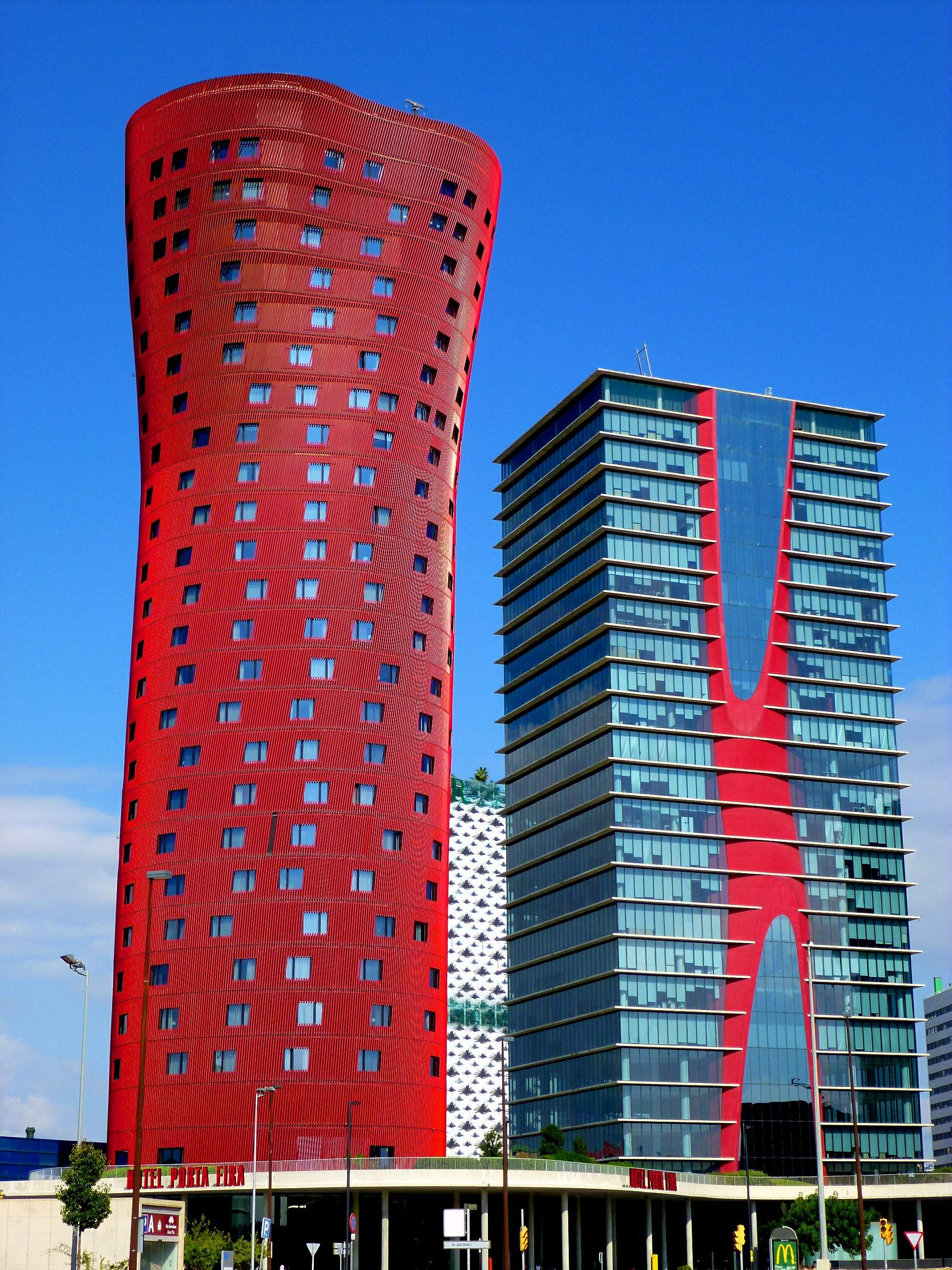
- Hotel Porta Fira, on the left
- Interactive map of the Hotel Porta Fira area

General information
- Status: Completed
- Type: Hotel
- Architectural style: Deconstructivism
- Location: Plaça d'Europa 45; L'Hospitalet de Llobregat suburb of Barcelona, Spain
- Coordinates: 41.35489°N 2.12554°E
- Construction started: June 2006
- Completed: February 2010

Height
- Roof: 113 m (371 ft)

Technical details
- Floor count: 26; 2 below ground
- Floor area: 34,688 m^{2} (373,380 sq ft)

Design and construction
- Architect: Toyo Ito
- Developer: Layetana/Inmobiliaria Colonial S.A./Inmobiliaria Metropolitana Vasco Central S.A./Metrópolis
- Main contractor: FCC

Other information
- Number of rooms: 345

Website
- http://hotelbarcelonaportafira.com/en/

Hotel Porta Fira (also Torres de Toyo Ito with Torre Realia BCN) is a 28-storey, 113 m (371 ft) skyscraper hotel designed by Toyo Ito on the Plaza de Europa in the district of Granvia l'Hospitalet in L'Hospitalet de Llobregat, a suburb of Barcelona, Catalonia, Spain. The building was the 2010 first-place winner of the Emporis Skyscraper Award.

== See also ==
- List of tallest buildings and structures in Barcelona
