= Toyo Ito =

Japanese architect

- 伊東 豊雄
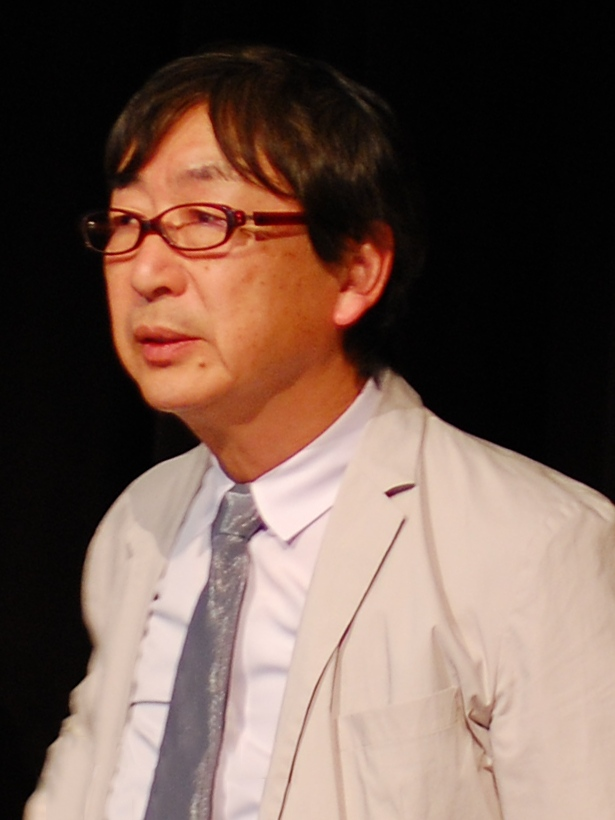
- Ito, at a lecture in April 2009
- Born: 1 June 1941 (age 85); Keijō, Japanese Korea
- Education: University of Tokyo
- Occupation: Architect
- Awards: Praemium Imperiale(2010); Pritzker Prize (2013)
- Practice: Toyo Ito & Associates
- Website: www.toyo-ito.co.jp

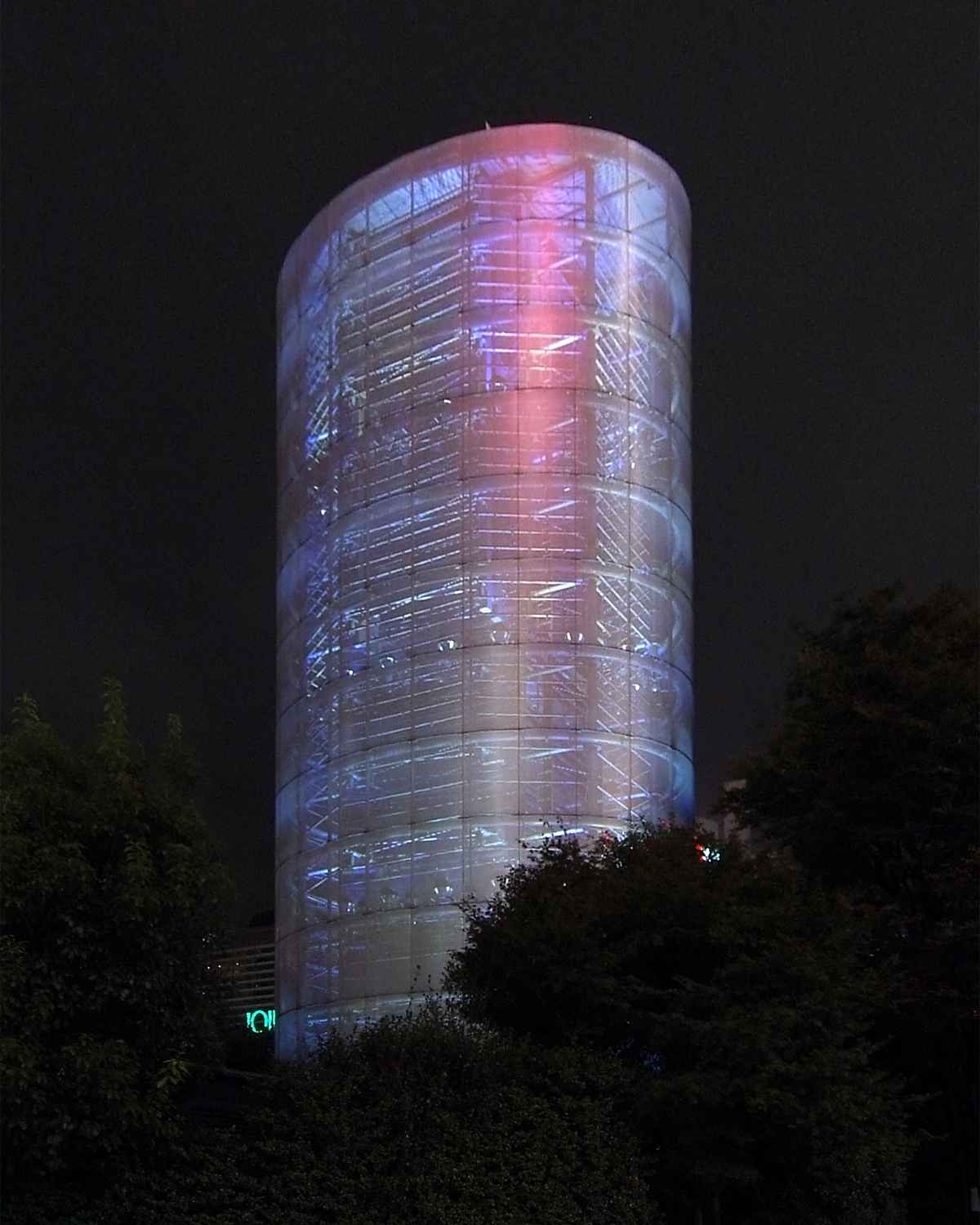
Tower of Winds, Yokohama (1986)

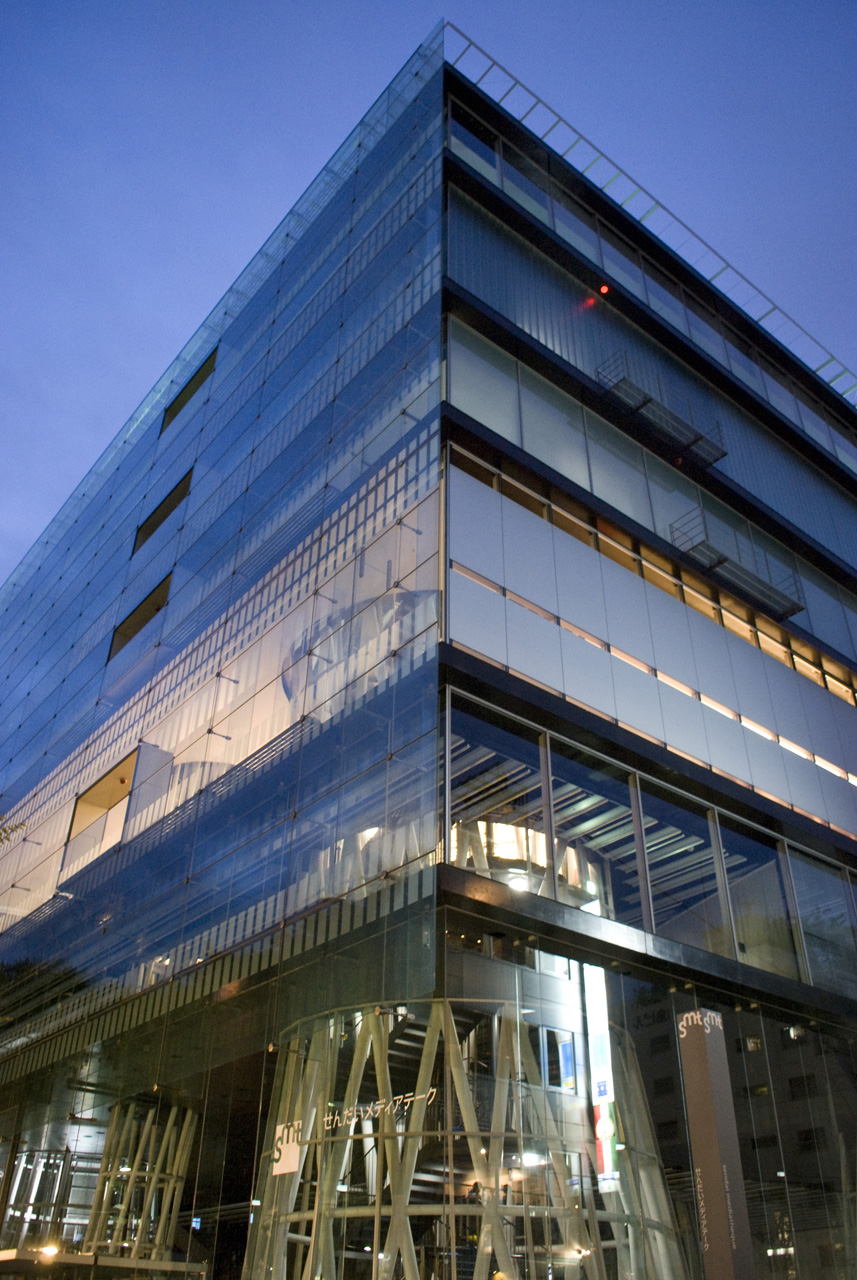
Sendai Mediatheque, (2001)

Toyo Ito (伊東 豊雄, Itō Toyō; born 1 June 1941) is a Japanese architect known for creating conceptual architecture, in which he seeks to simultaneously express the physical and virtual worlds. He is a leading exponent of architecture that addresses the contemporary notion of a "simulated" city, and has been called "one of the world's most innovative and influential architects."

In 2013, Ito was awarded the Pritzker Prize, one of architecture's most prestigious prizes. He was a likely front-runner for the Pritzker Prize for the previous 10 years. A recent trend has seen less experienced and well-known winners, for example Chinese architect Wang Shu in 2012, and the award to Toyo Ito is seen as recognition of a lifetime's achievement in architecture.

== Early life and education ==
Ito was born in Keijō, Japanese Korea (today's Seoul, South Korea) to Japanese parents on 1 June 1941. In 1943, he moved to Japan with his mother and two sisters living until middle school age in rural Shimosuwa, Nagano Prefecture. His father was the chairman of a textile subsidiary of Mitsui & Co. His father returned to Japan just before the end of the Second World War to live with his family. Ito has stated that his experience of living by Lake Suwa and the stillness of its waters had a great impact on him as an architect later in life.

Ito attended Hibiya High School in central Tokyo, where he was a member of the baseball team. His first application to the University of Tokyo was unsuccessful and Ito spent a year as a ronin student. He matriculated at the University of Tokyo in 1961, and chose architecture as his field of specialisation in his second year only because his grades for the first year was not good. He originally intended to study either mechanical or electrical engineering. At the time, Kenzo Tange was among the faculty of the university's architecture department, while Arata Isozaki, Sachio Otani, and Kisho Kurokawa were his students. Ito graduated from the University of Tokyo's department of architecture in 1965.

== Career ==
After working for Kiyonori Kikutake Architect and Associates from 1965 to 1969 (alongside Itsuko Hasegawa), in 1971 he started his own studio in Tokyo, named Urbot ("Urban Robot"). In 1979, the studio name was changed to Toyo Ito & Associates.

Throughout his early career Ito constructed numerous private house projects that expressed aspects of urban life in Japan. His most remarkable early conceptual contributions were made through projects of this scale, such as White U (1976) and Silver Hut (1984).

With the Pao for the Tokyo Nomad Girl projects in 1985 and 1989, Ito presented a vision of the life of an urban nomad, illustrative of typical lifestyles during the bubble economy period in Japan.

Tower of Winds (1986) and Egg of Winds (1991) are interactive landmarks in public spaces, resulting from a creative interpretation of contemporary technical possibilities. Whilst their function is in fact exhaust air outlets for the underground system below, their significance lies in Ito's treatment of their opacity, one of the hallmarks of his work. Whilst appearing solid during the day, the perforated aluminium structures "dissolve" at night through the use of computer-controlled light systems which form an interactive display representing measured data such as noise levels in their surrounding vicinity.

Toyo Ito's office is known as a training ground for talented younger architects. Architects who previously worked for his office include Kazuyo Sejima and Ryue Nishizawa (SANAA), Astrid Klein and Mark Dytham (KDa), Katsuya Fukushima, Makoto Yokomizo, and Akihisa Hirata.

=== Critical vision ===
Ito's work is often said to have affinities with the ideas of philosophers such as Munesuke Mita and Gilles Deleuze.

Ito has defined architecture as "clothing" for urban dwellers, particularly in the contemporary Japanese metropolis. This theme revolves around the equilibrium between the private life and the metropolitan, "public" life of an individual.

The current architecture of Toyo Ito expands on his work produced during the postmodern period, aggressively exploring the potentials of new forms. In doing so, he seeks to find new spatial conditions that manifest the philosophy of borderless beings.

=== Exhibitions ===
Ito's work has been exhibited widely. In 1991, Ito used 130 video projectors to simulate the urban environment of Tokyo for the Visions of Japan exhibition at The Victoria and Albert Museum in London. Later, in 2000, his Vision and Reality at the Louisiana Museum of Modern Art also became a traveling exhibition. Ito similarly exploited the effect of video projection as a medium with which to exhibit architecture in his Blurring Architecture exhibition, initiated at the Suermondt-Ludwig-Museum in Aachen and traveling to four other cities (Tokyo, Antwerp, Auckland, and Wellington between 1999 and 2001).

Ito designed the Berlin-Tokyo/Tokyo-Berlin Exhibition (2006) at the Neue Nationalgalerie, Berlin. The design featured a smooth, undulating landscape that occupied almost the entirety of the museum's main exhibition space. This exhibition, in collaboration with the Mori Art Museum, was one of the largest undertakings in the museum's history. A major retrospective of Ito's work was shown at the Tokyo Opera City Art Gallery in 2006 as Toyo Ito: The New "Real" in Architecture.

=== List of works ===
- 1976 – White U House (house for his sister)
- 1984 – Silver Hut (Ito's own house, adjacent to White U)
- 1986 – Tower of Winds, West Exit, Yokohama Station, Nishi-ku, Yokohama
- 1991 – Yatsushiro Municipal Museum
- 1994 – Old People's Home in Yatsushiro
- 2001 – Sendai Mediatheque: a multi-function complex accommodating a mixed programme of library, art gallery, audio-visual library, film studio and café. It was a competition winning scheme chosen in 1995 from amongst 235 competing proposals. Widely recognised as one of Ito's seminal works.
- 2002 – Temporary Serpentine Gallery Pavilion, in Kensington Gardens, London
- 2002 – Bruges pavilion
- 2004 – Matsumoto Performing Art Center, Matsumoto
- 2004 – Tod's Omotesandō Building, Tokyo
- 2006 – First Prize "Taichung Opera International Competition" in Taiwan
- 2006 – VivoCity Singapore at HarbourFront
- 2007 – Library of Tama Art University, Tokyo
- 2008 – World Games Stadium in Kaohsiung, Taiwan
- 2008 – Huge Wine Glass in Pescara (broken after 64 days from unveiling)
- 2009 – Suites Avenue Building, Barcelona, Spain
- 2009 – Torre Realia BCN and Hotel Porta Fira, L'Hospitalet de Llobregat, Barcelona, Spain
- 2009 – Za-Koenji Public Theater, Kōenji, Suginami, Tokyo
- 2009 – White O, Marbella, Chile
- 2011 – Toyo Ito Museum of Architecture, Imabari, Ehime, Japan
- 2011 – Ken Iwata Mother and Child Museum, Imabari, Ehime, Japan
- 2013 – College of Social Sciences, National Taiwan University, Taipei, Taiwan
- 2013 – Taipei New Horizon Building, Taipei, Taiwan
- 2014 – National Taichung Theater, Taiwan
- 2014 – CapitaGreen, Singapore
- 2015 – Meiso no Mori Municipal Funeral Hall Kakamigahara-shi, Gifu, Japan
- 2016 – International Museum of the Baroque, Puebla, Mexico
- 2019 – The Tokyo Toilet project - Three Mushrooms, Tokyo, Japan

=== Gallery of works ===
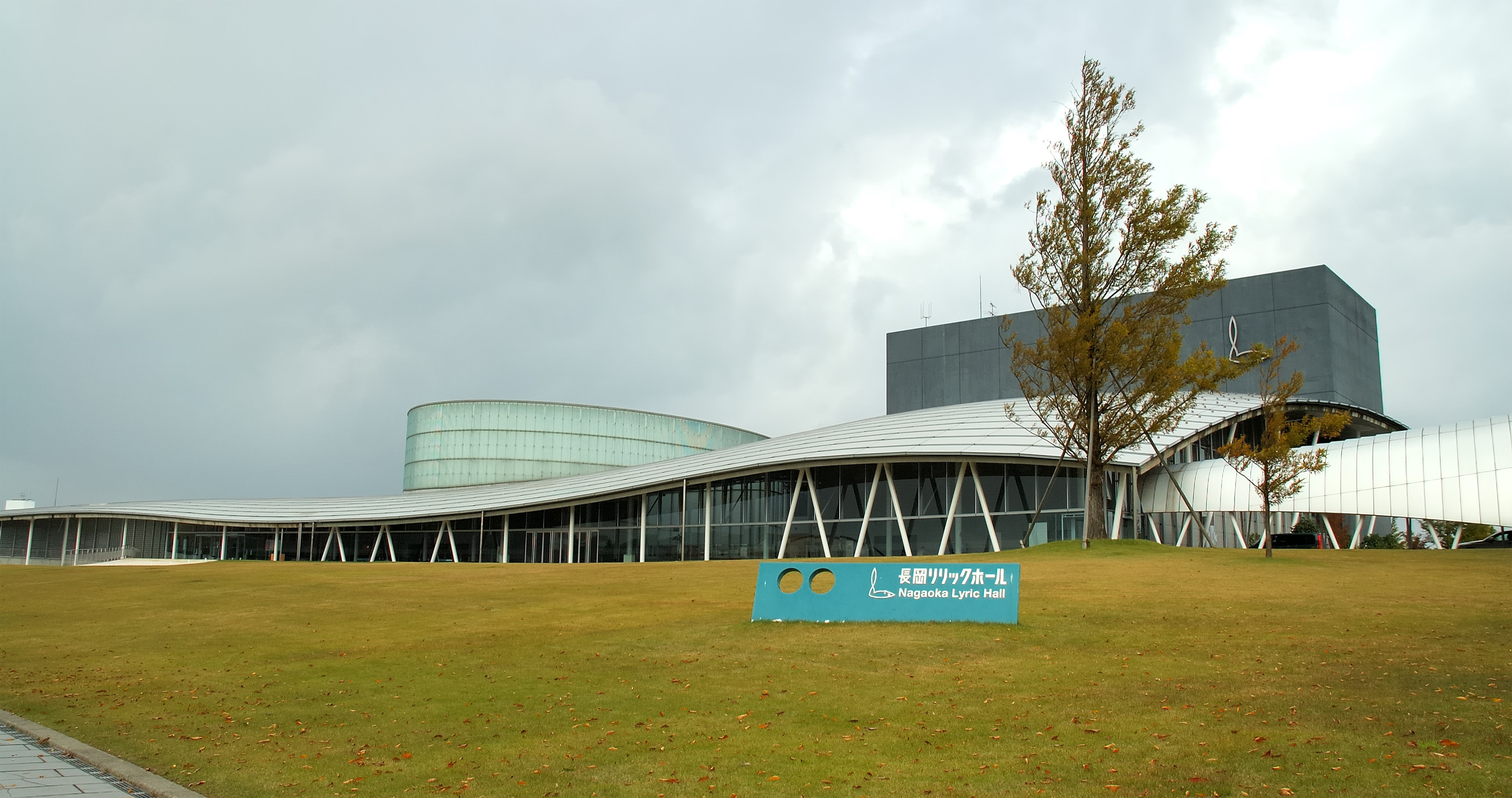
Nagaoka Lyric Hall (1994, Nagaoka)

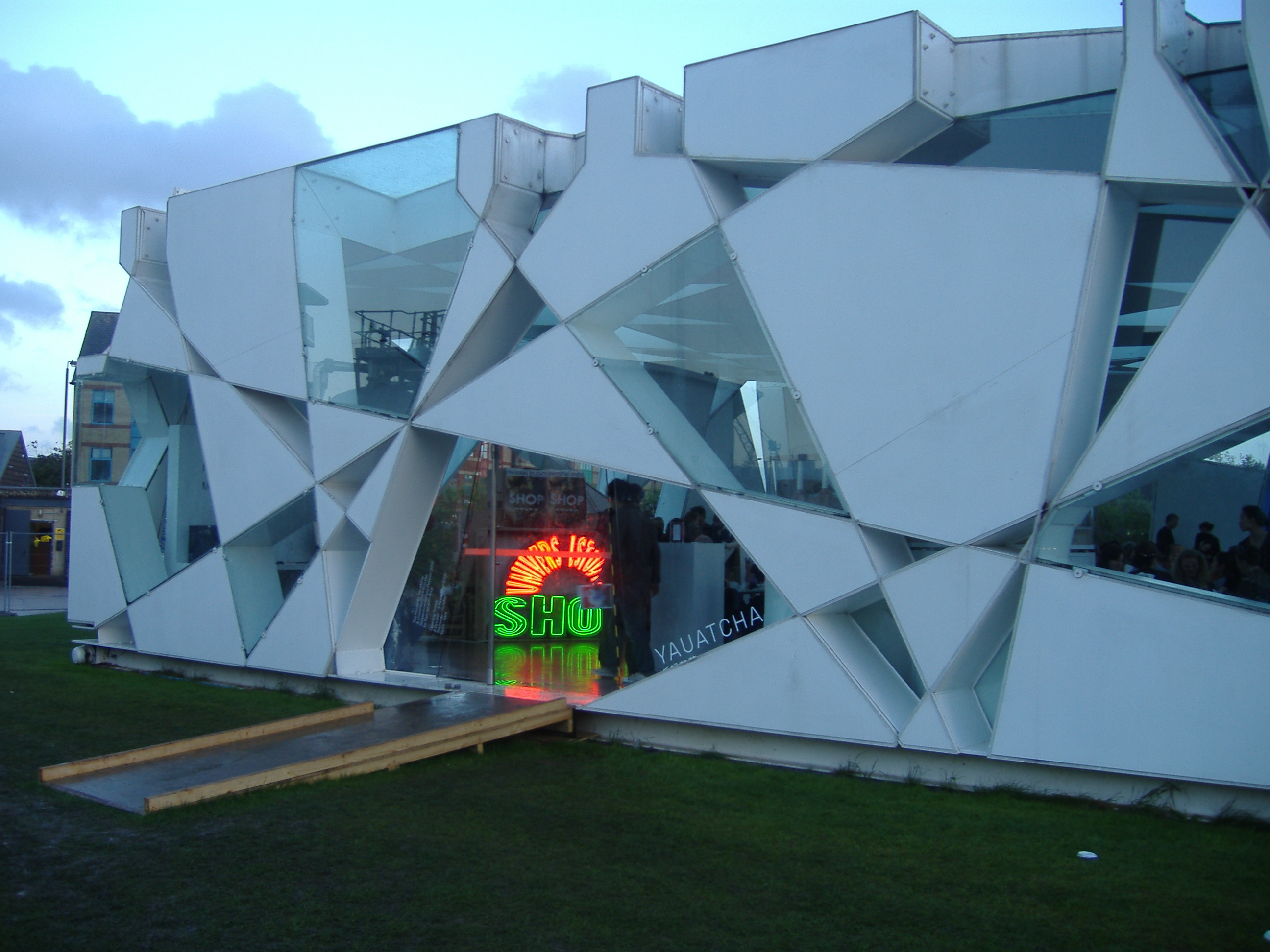
Serpentine Gallery, London, UK (2002)

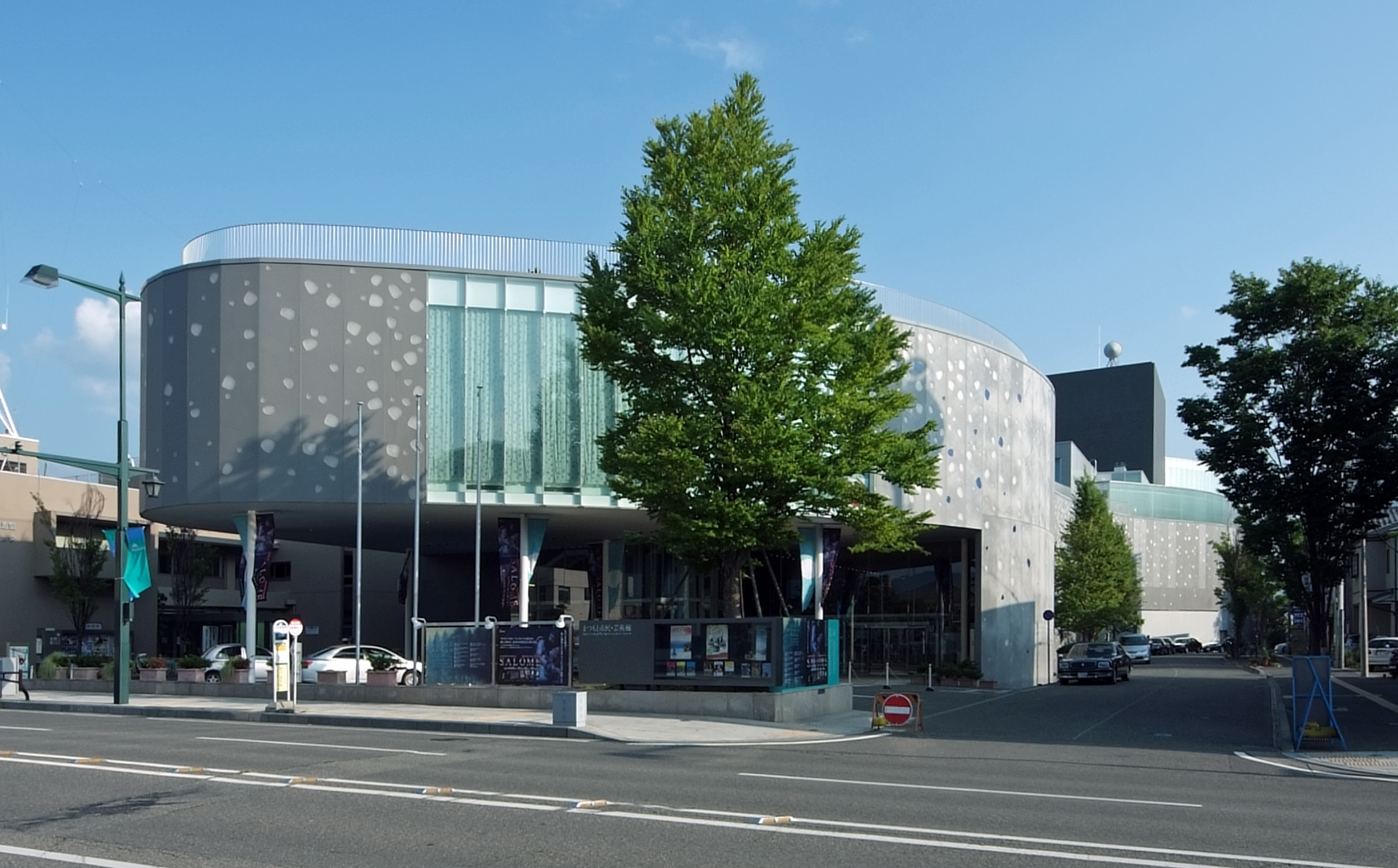
Matsumoto Performing Arts Centre (2004)

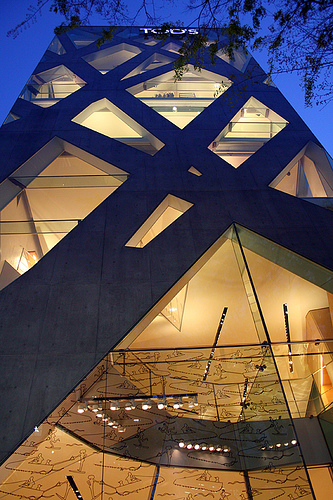
TOD's Omotesando Building, Tokyo, Japan (2004)

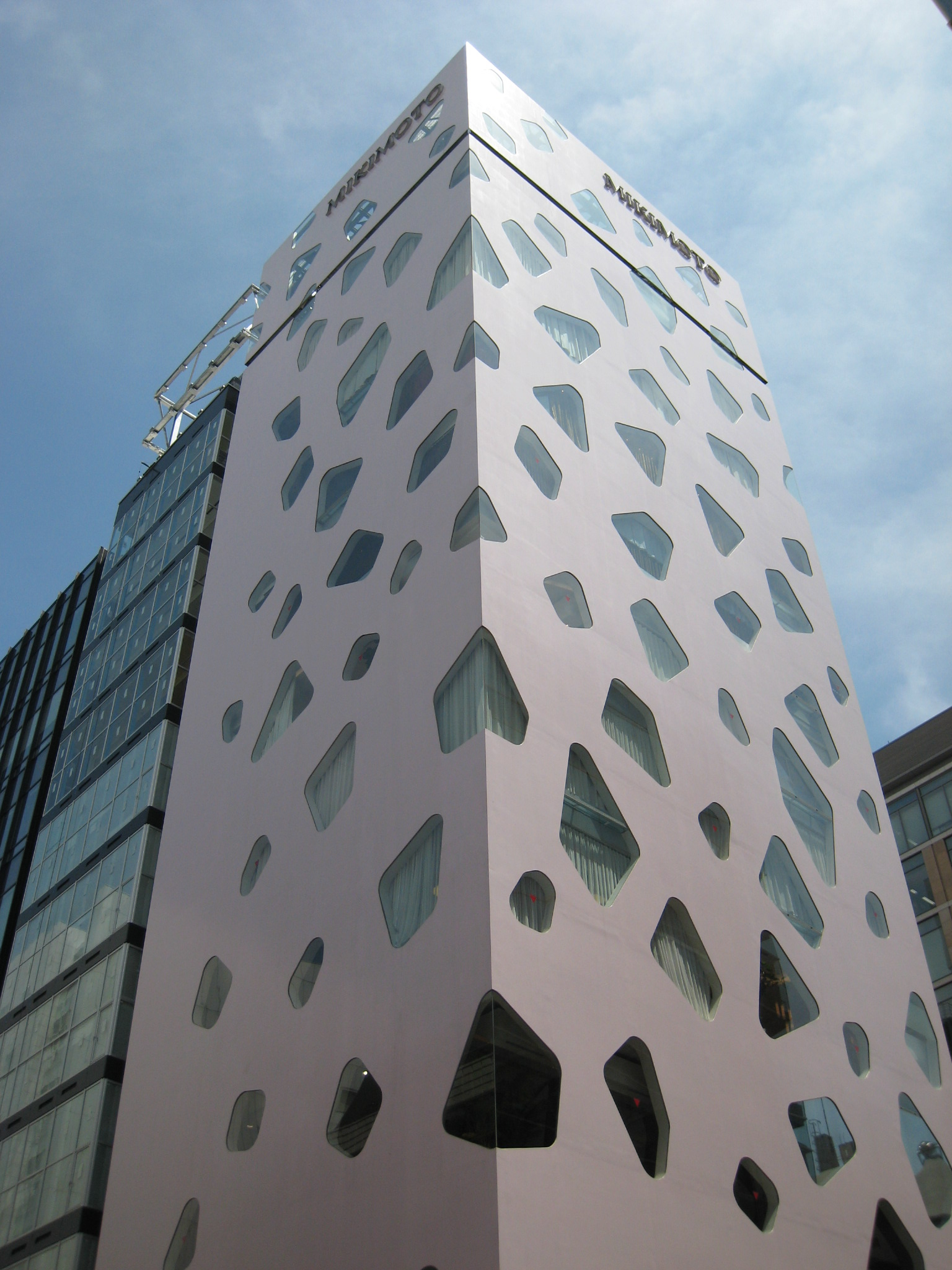
Mikimoto Ginza 2, Tokyo, Japan (2005)

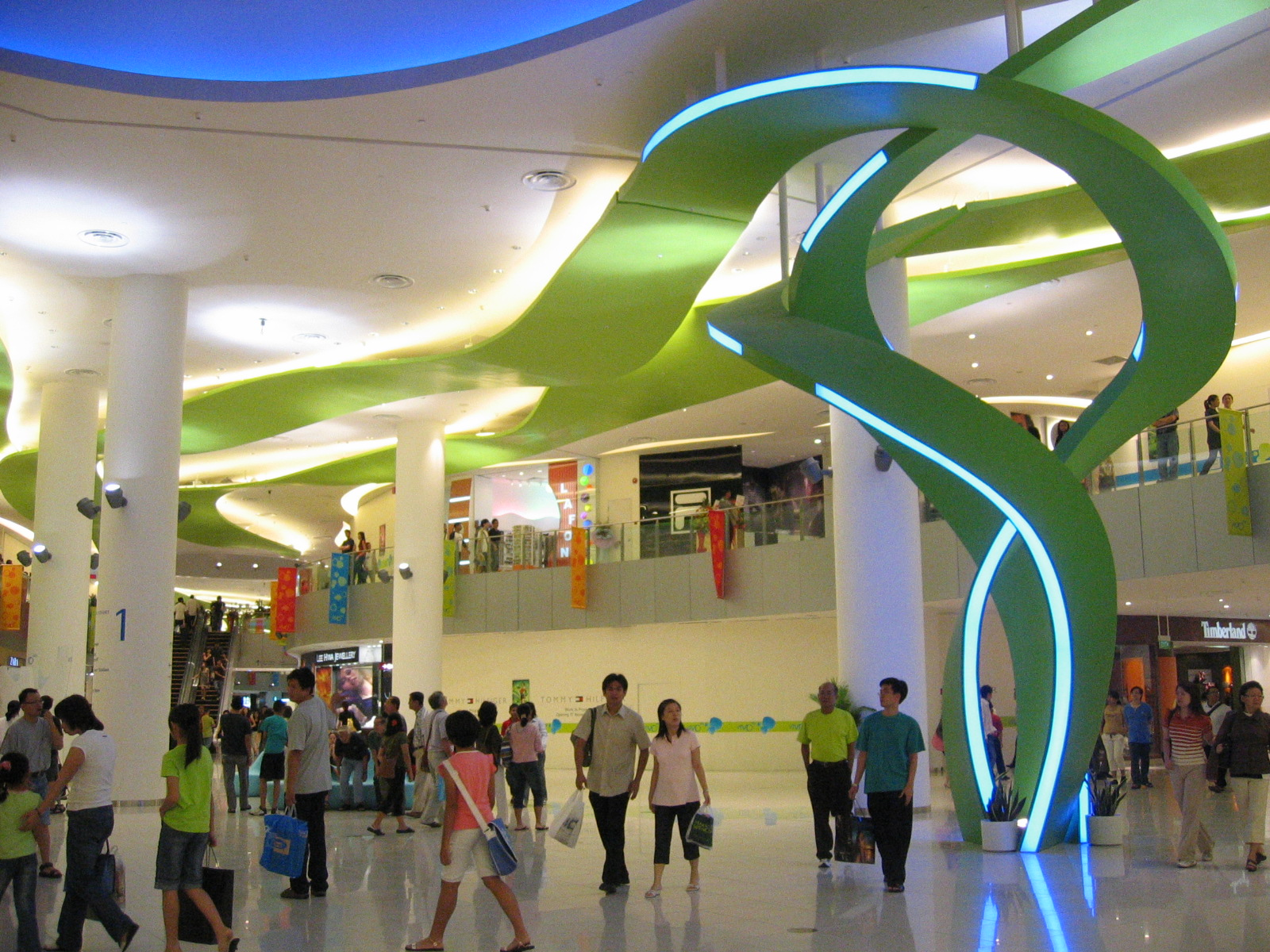
VivoCity, Singapore (2006)

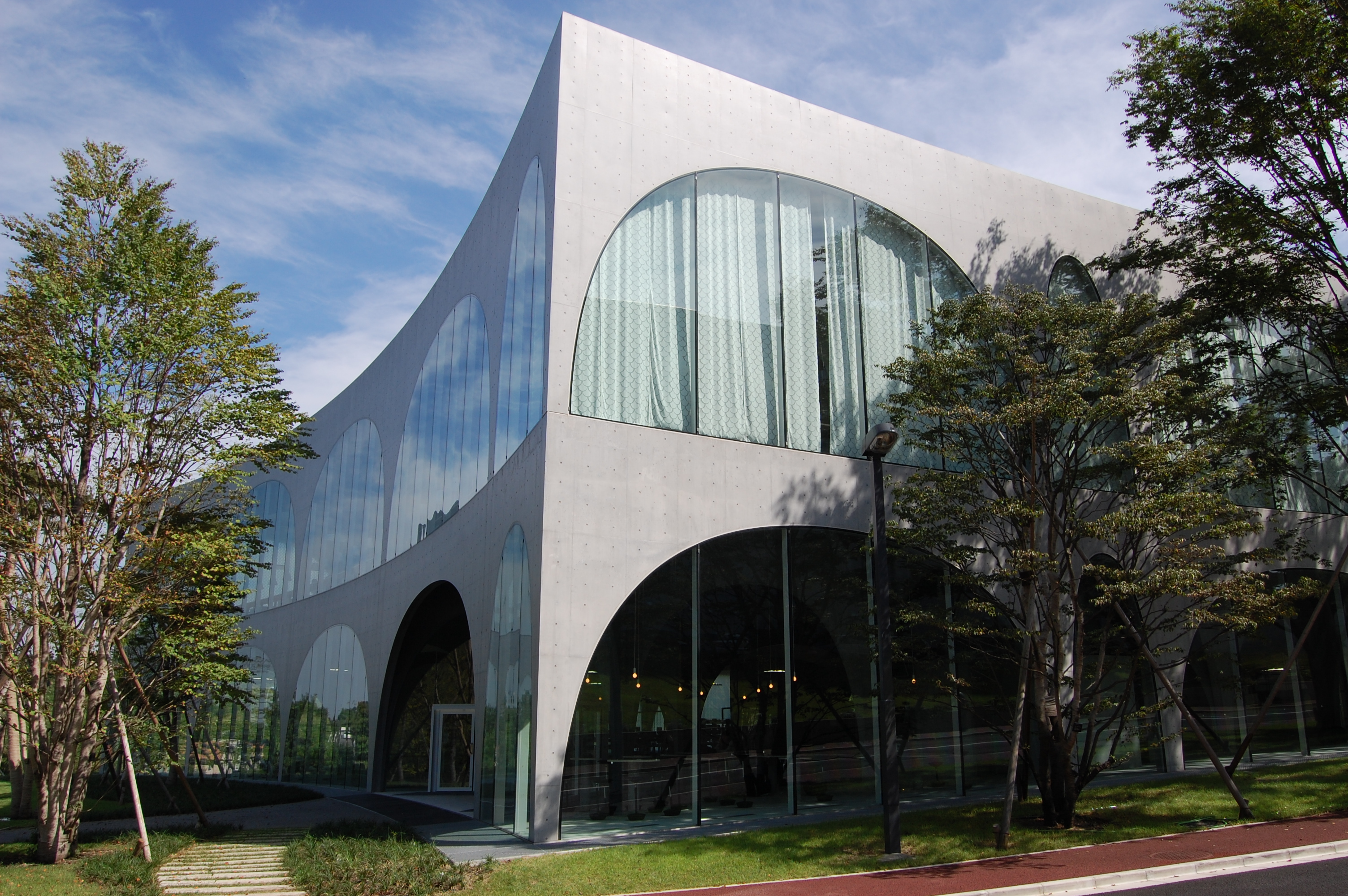
Library of Tama Art University, Tokyo, Japan (2007)

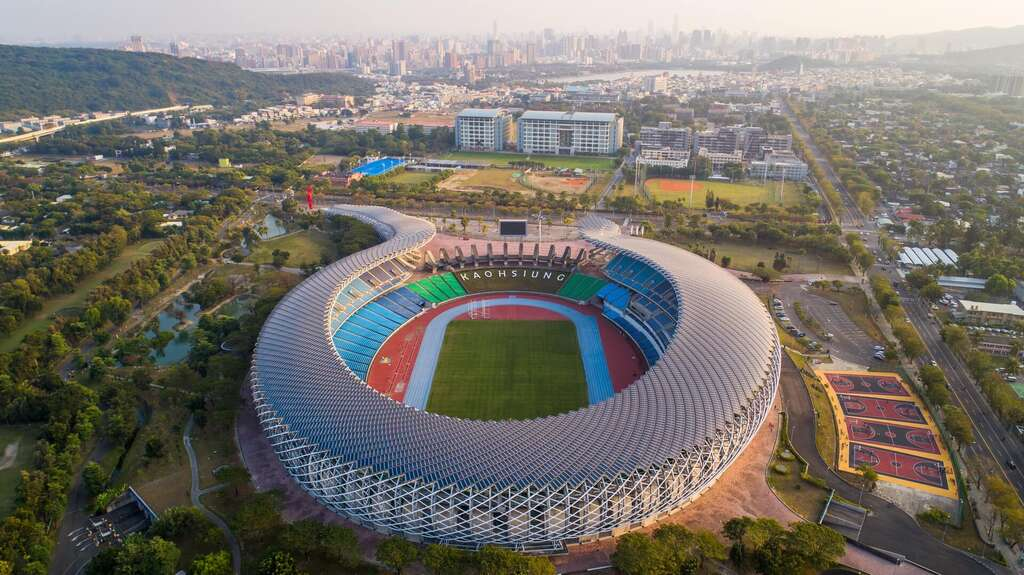
World Games Stadium, Kaohsiung, Taiwan (2008)

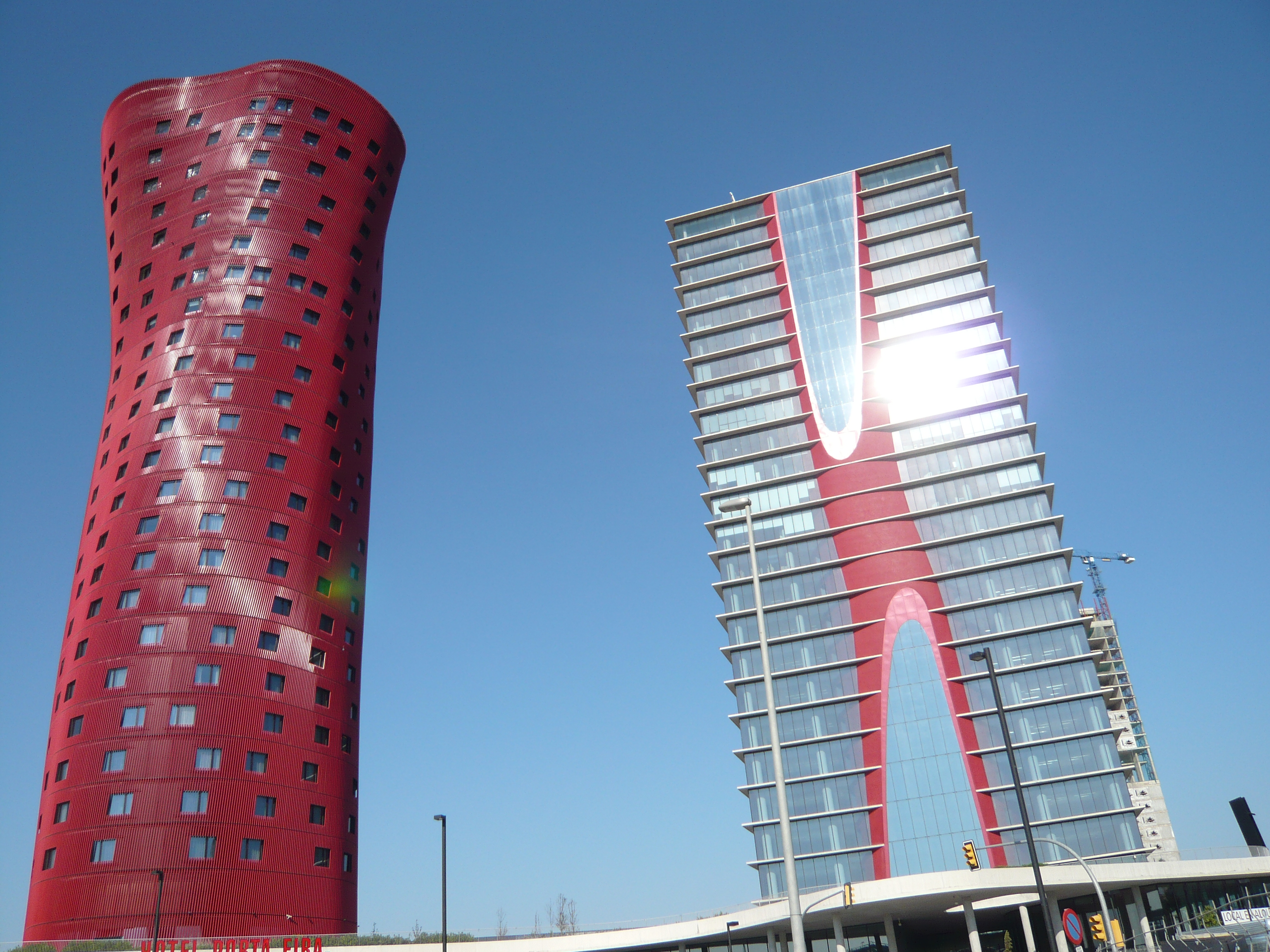
Torre Realia BCN and Hotel Porta Fira, L'Hospitalet de Llobregat, Barcelona, Spain (2009)

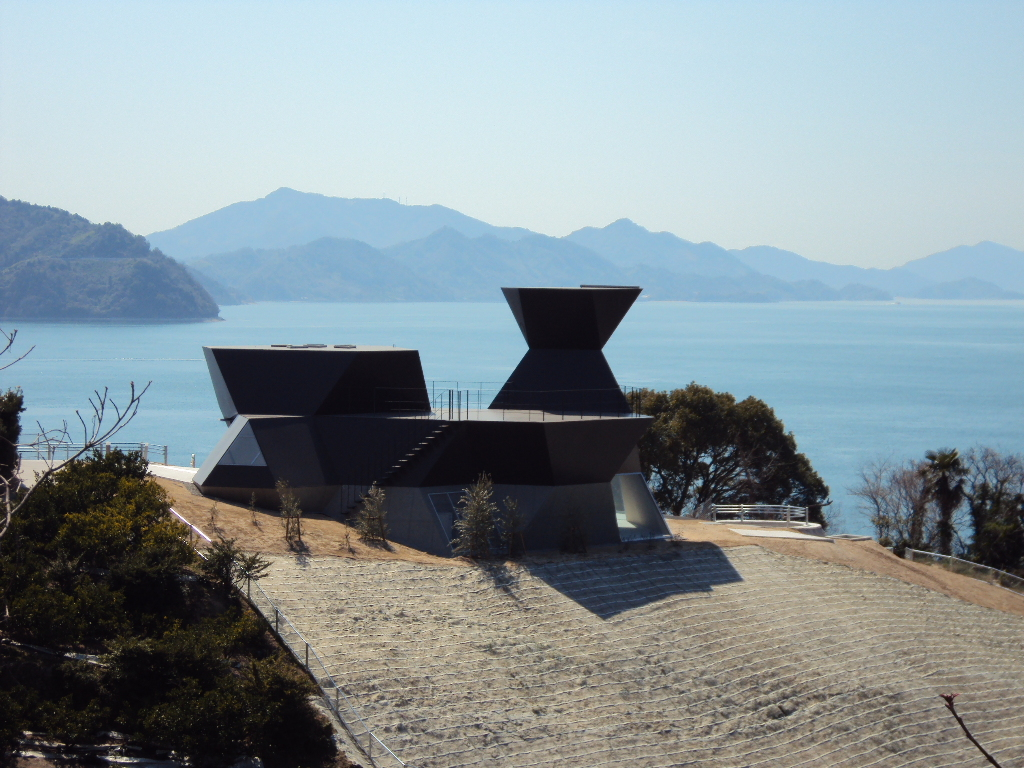
Toyo Ito Museum of Architecture, Imabari, Ehime, Japan (2011)

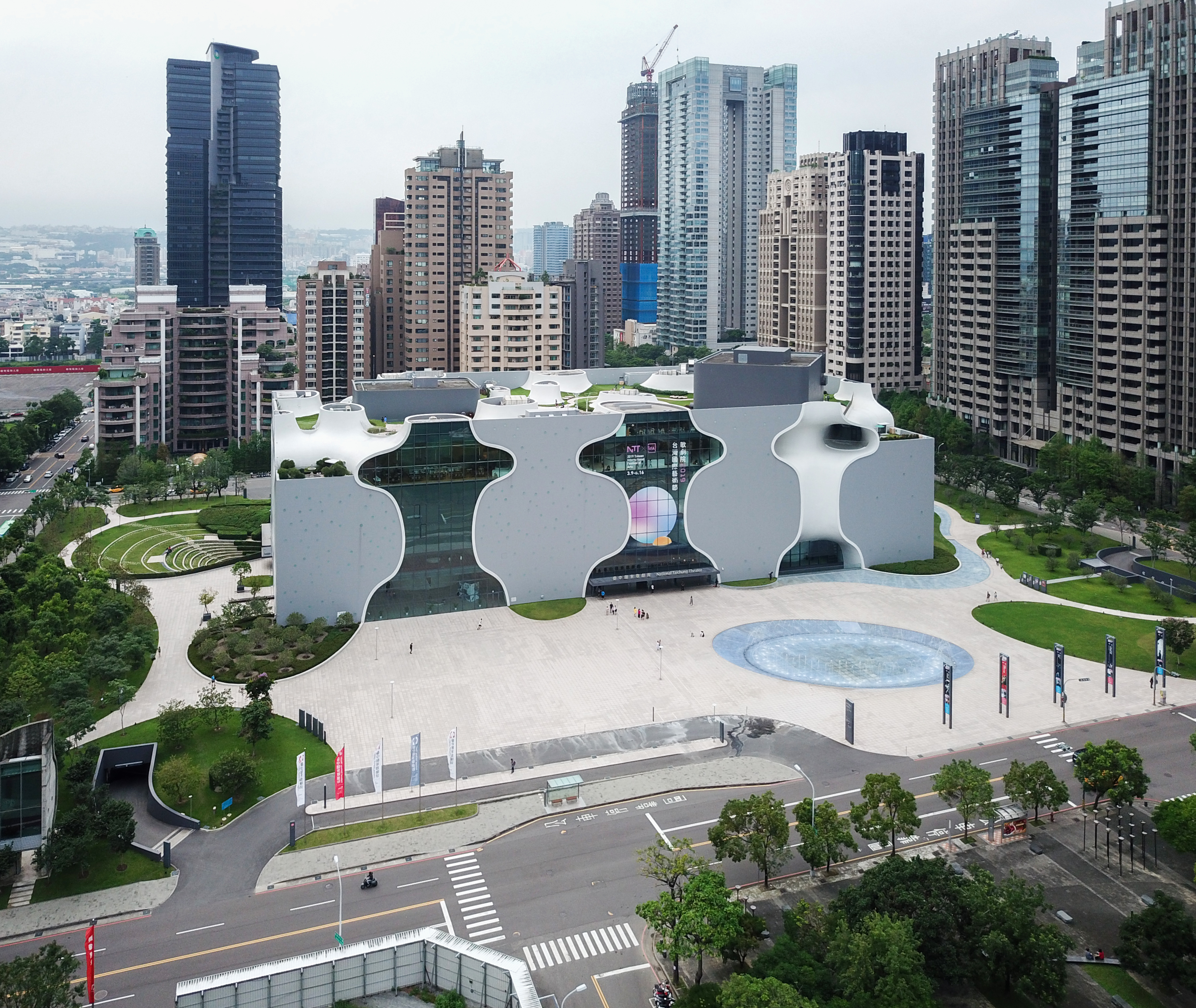
National Taichung Theater, Taichung, Taiwan (2014)

=== Honors and recognition ===
Ito's awards and honors include:

- 1986 – Architectural Institute of Japan Award for Silver Hut
- 1992 – 33rd Mainichi Art Award for Yatsushiro Municipal Museum
- 1997 – IAA 'Interach '97' Grand Prix of the Union of Architects in Bulgaria Gold Medal
- 1998 – Education Minister's Art Encouragement Prize in Japan
- 2000 – Arnold W. Brunner Memorial Prize in architecture from the American Academy of Arts and Letters
- 2001 – Gold prize of the Japanese Good Design Award
- 2006 – RIBA Royal Gold Medal
- 2008 – Frederick Kiesler Prize for Architecture and the Arts
- 2009 – Asahi Prize
- 2010 – Praemium Imperiale
- 2012 - Golden Lion for Best National Participation at the Venice Biennale of Architecture
- 2013 – Pritzker Prize for Architecture
- 2013 – Asahi Prize
- 2014 – Mathew Art Award in Berlin
- 2016, 2017 – Prix Versailles World Judge
- 2017 – UIA Gold Medal
- 2018 – Person of Cultural Merit
- 2020 – Design Educates Award, Jury member
- 2023 – Honorary Royal Academician (HonRA)
- 2026 – Order of Culture

=== Professorship ===
Ito holds a professorship at the Japan Women's University. He is also an honorary professor at the University of North London and has served as guest professor at Columbia University. He teaches at Tama Art University Graduate program as a professor.
