= Berlin-Tokyo/Tokyo-Berlin =

Berlin-Tokyo/Tokyo-Berlin. The Art of Two Cities was an exhibition presented by the Neue Nationalgalerie, New National Gallery in Berlin, Germany 7 June - 3 October 2006

On the occasion of the Germany Year in Japan 2005/2006, the Mori Art Museum Tokyo and the Neue Nationalgalerie (New National Gallery) Berlin supported by the Berlin Art Library, the Kupferstichkabinett Berlin (Museum of Prints and Drawings) and the Museum für Ostasiatische Kunst (Museum of East Asian Art), organized a comprehensive art show with the title "Berlin-Tokyo/Tokyo-Berlin. Die Kunst zweier Städte".

== Artists ==
- Franz Ackermann
- Makoto Aida
- Sayaka Akiyama
- Nobuyoshi Araki
- Atelier Bow-Wow
- Frank Badur
- Max Beckmann
- Georges Braque
- Candice Breitz
- Alexander Calder
- Chiharu Shiota
- Salvador Dalí
- Adolf Dietrich
- Otto Dix
- Jean Dubuffet
- Raoul Dufy
- Annika Eriksson
- Max Ernst
- Lyonel Feininger
- Nina Fischer & Maroan el Sani
- Günter Fruhtrunk
- Rupprecht Geiger
- Kuno Gonschior
- Gotthard Graubner
- Juan Gris
- Katharina Grosse
- George Grosz
- Erich Hauser
- Erich Heckel
- Bernhard Heiliger
- Al Held
- Ferdinand Hodler
- Leiko Ikemura
- Yoshiaki Kaihatsu
- Momoyo Kaijima
- Wassily Kandinsky
- Izima Kaoru
- Ellsworth Kelly
- Ernst Ludwig Kirchner
- Konrad Klapheck
- Paul Klee
- Takehito Koganezawa
- Oskar Kokoschka
- Leo Kornbrust
- Yayoi Kusama
- Henri Laurens
- Naofumi Maruyama
- Tatsuo Miyajima
- Shintaro Miyake
- Tsuyoshi Ozawa
- Max Pechstein
- Manfred Pernice
- Daniel Richter
- Saki Satom
- Shimabuku
- Corinne Wasmuth

== Subjects ==
For the architectural design of the Upper Hall, the Nationalgalerie commissioned the Japanese architect Toyo Ito. In collaboration with architects Florian Busch and Christoph Cellarius, Ito transformed Mies van der Rohe's glass shrine into an exciting space, a completely new experience in which art and architecture have melt in an unusual fusion. Following Mies' rigorous Cartesian logic, the three architects' project transformed the strictly homogeneous exhibition hall into a continuous yet subtly differentiated space where the thirteen artists exhibiting on the upper hall started interesting dialogues and so heightened the intensity of the exhibition's theme.
