= International Museum of the Baroque =

Coordinates: 19.0193°N 98.2466°W

- Museo Internacional del Barroco
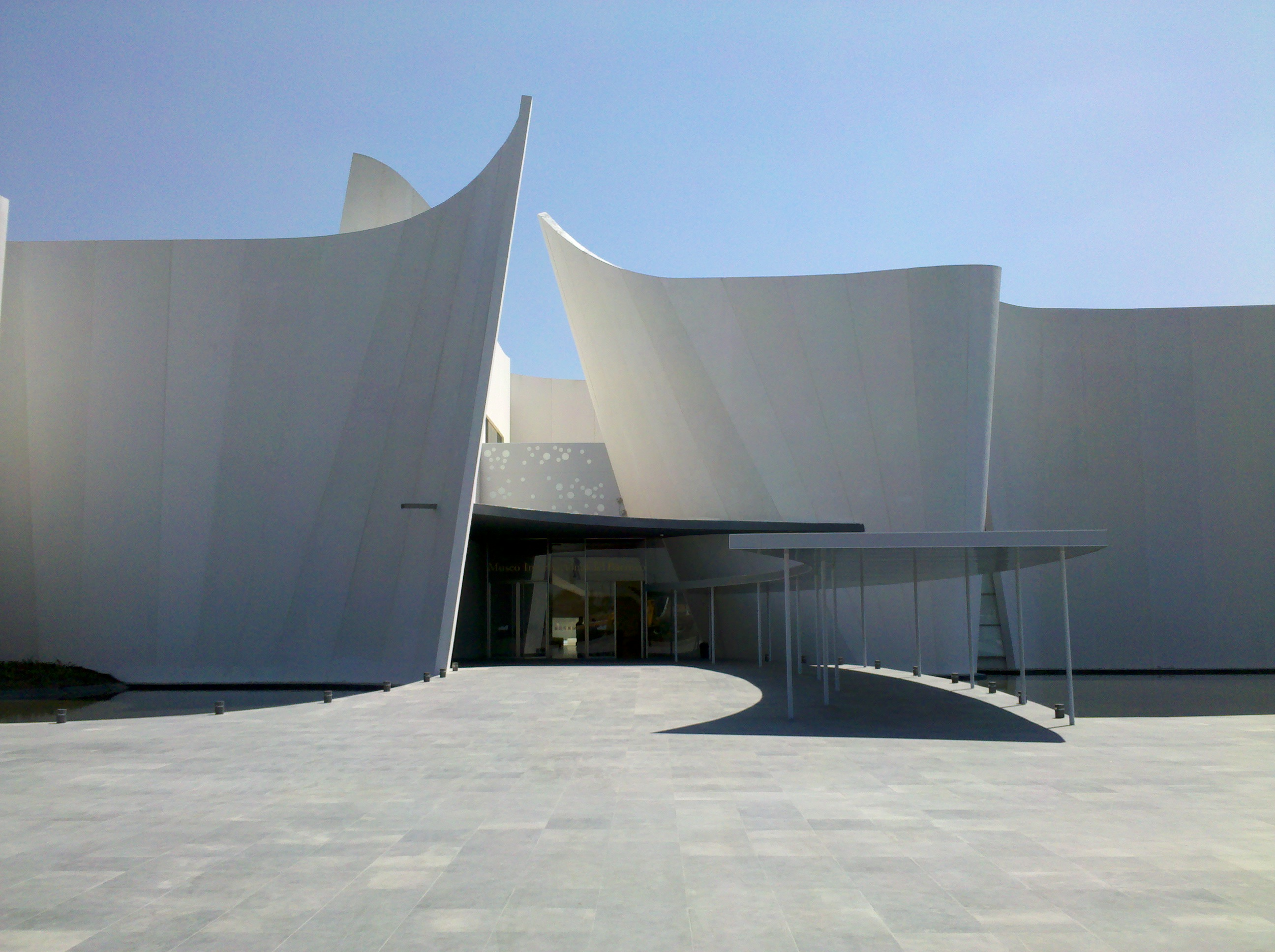
- Entrance
- Established: February 4, 2016
- Location: Puebla, Mexico
- Type: Art museum
- Collections: Baroque art
- Architect: Toyo Ito

The International Museum of the Baroque (Spanish: Museo Internacional del Barroco, MIB) is a museum of Baroque art designed by Japanese architect Toyo Ito located in Puebla, Mexico. It opened on February 4, 2016.

The original MIB project was dedicated to the conservation, research, and dissemination of the diverse manifestations of Baroque sensibility in its artistic, cultural, social, scientific, and technological aspects. The initial curatorial proposal sought to represent the complexity of Baroque expression in the fields of architecture, painting and sculpture, literature, and others; it also included a program of temporary exhibitions.

Since the project's announcement, the intellectual and academic community raised several objections regarding issues such as the origin of the pieces, the museum's central theme, and the lack of transparency and clarity concerning construction and maintenance costs. Following this controversy, and with the change of state administration, the MIB was reopened on October 26, 2019, with the exhibition " New Rites: Saints, Mourning, and Deities" by Mexican artist Mauro Terán.

== Gallery ==
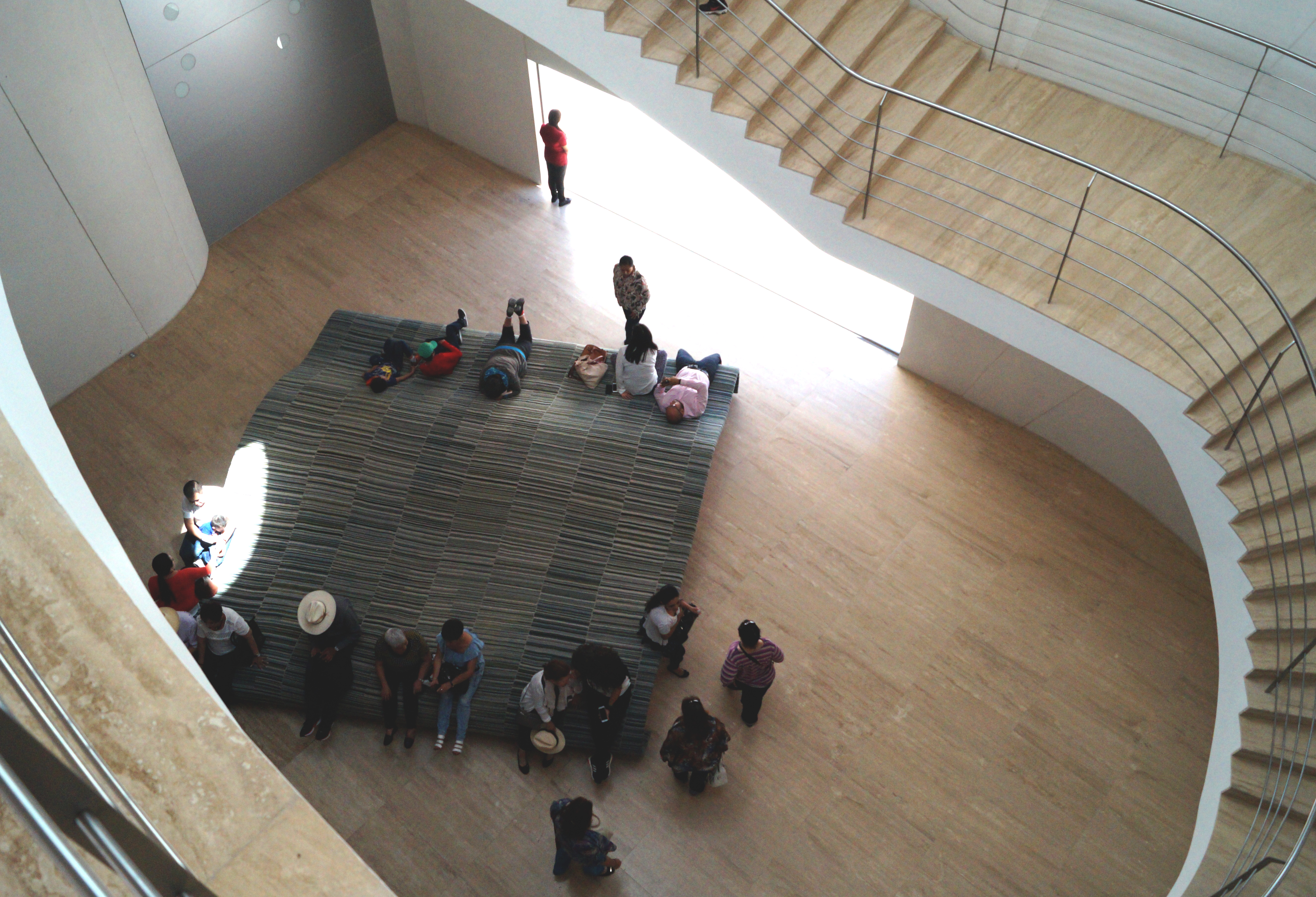
Stairs

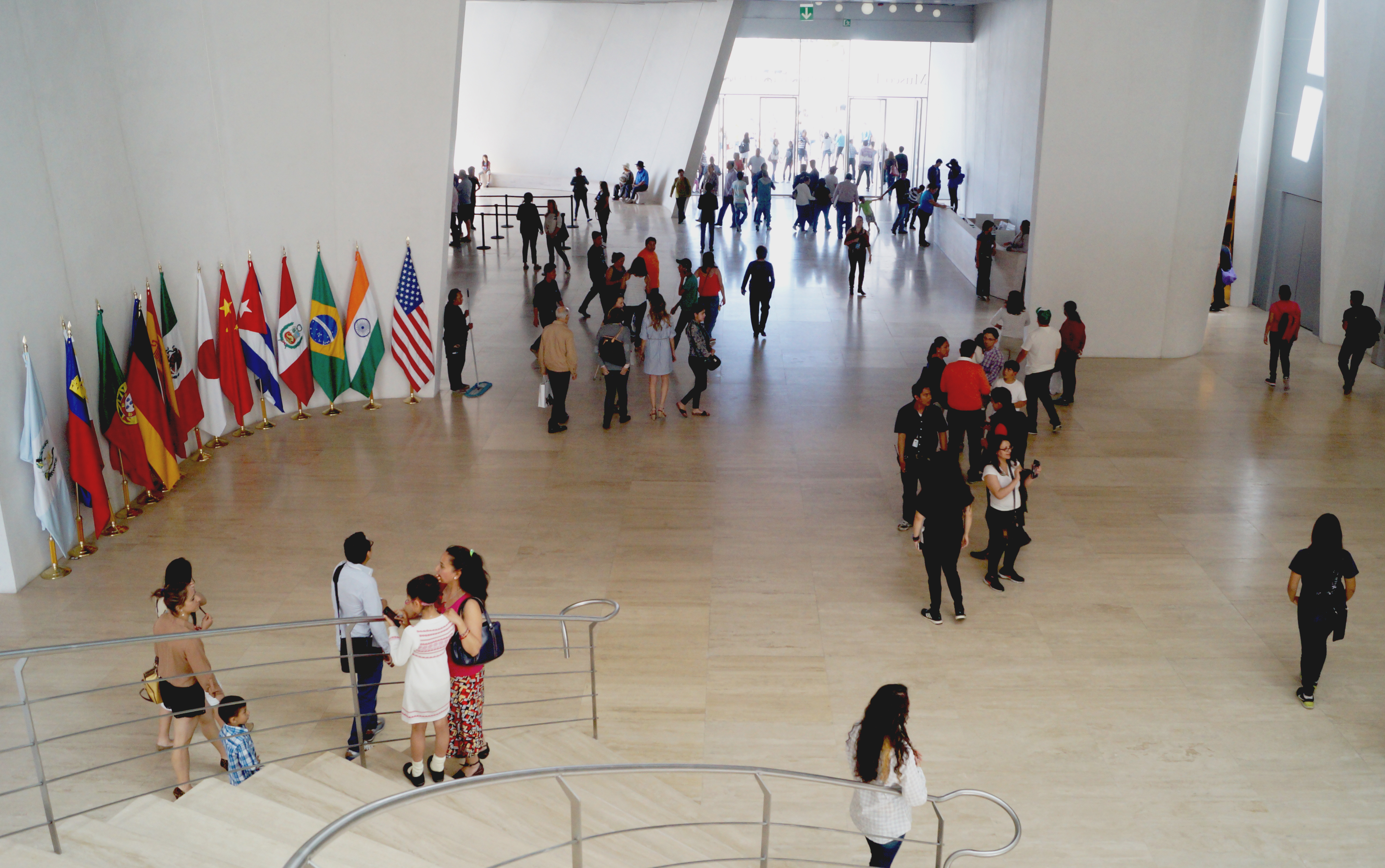
Lobby

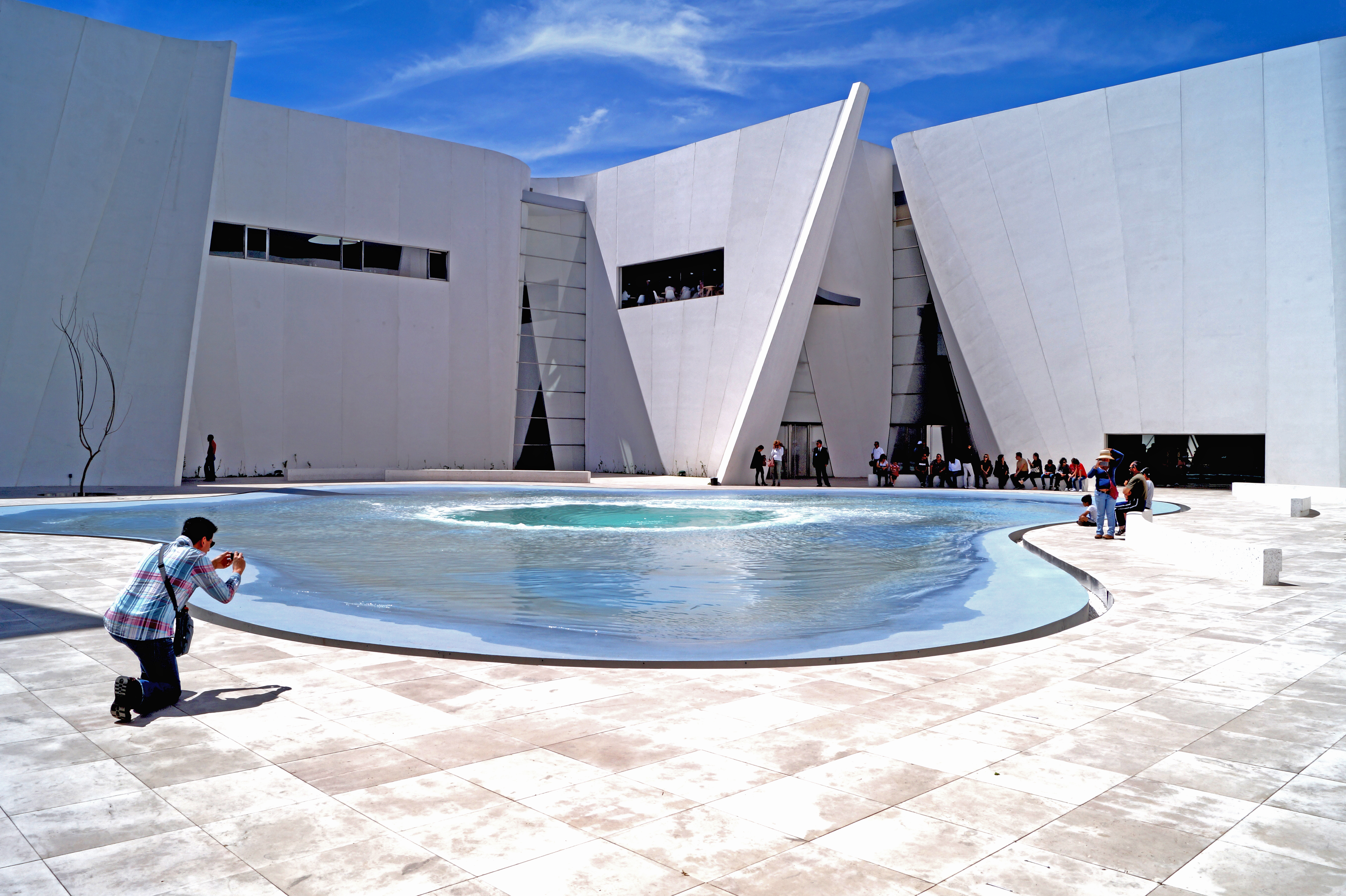
Fountain

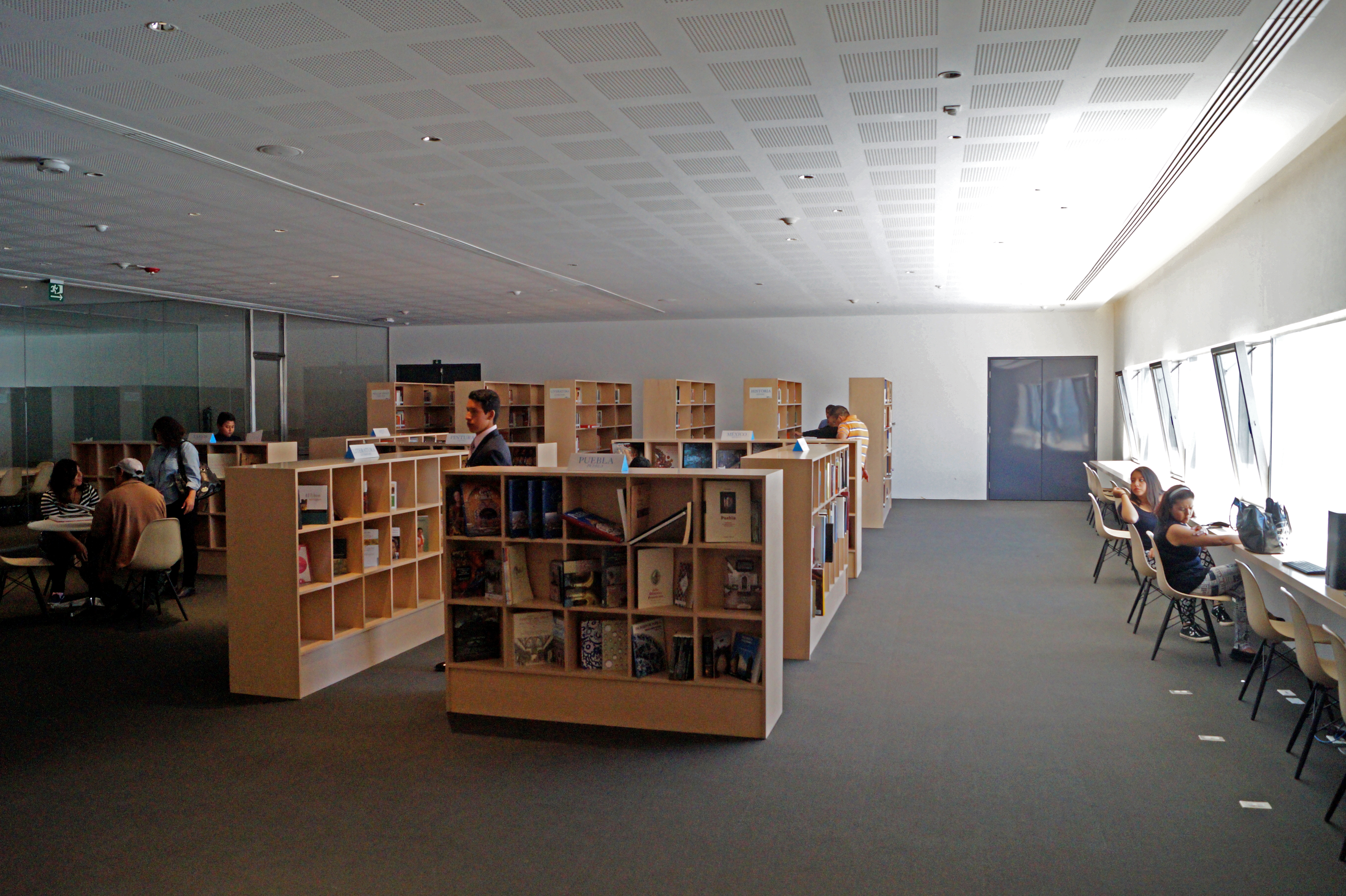
Library

== See also ==
- Amparo Museum
