= Libyan Technology Foundation =

Libyan non-profit organization

- المؤسسة الليبية للتقنية
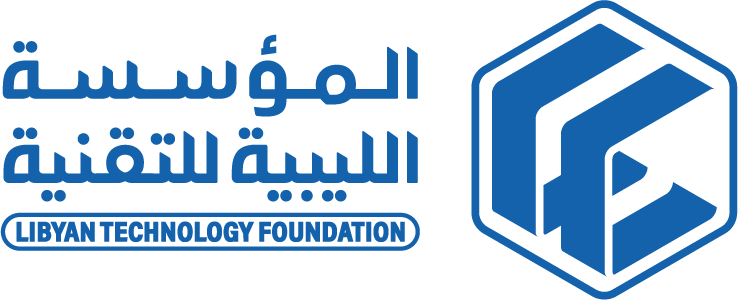
- Abbreviation: LTF
- Established: 25 August 2020 (6 years ago)
- Headquarters: Tripoli
- Country: Libya
- Membership: Internet Society International Telecommunication Union
- Chairpersons: Amin salih
- Website: technology.ly/en

The Libyan Technology Foundation (Arabic: المؤسسة الليبية للتقنية), formerly Libyan Information and Communications Technology Organization, is a Libyan non-profit organization, established in 2020 with the objectives of spreading technical awareness and promoting understanding of technology-related legislation, and supporting the development of the communications and information technology sector in Libya. It is a member of the Internet Society, the Public Key Infrastructure Association, and the International Telecommunication Union. The organization has been officially registered in the European Union's Transparency Register.

== Establishment ==
The Foundation was established on August 25, 2020, as a civil society organization support technical knowledge and access to technology.

== Foundation contributions ==
Since the beginning of its work, the Foundation has contributed to the development of digital legislation. The Foundation has also prepared the general policy for e-mail for Libyan institutions which was approved by the Government of National Unity. Within the framework of legislation and regulation, the Foundation has also prepared a guide and regulation to organize social media for government institutions in cooperation with the Government Communication Center.

In terms of the Foundation's work in developing and supporting youth and holding events, the Government of National Unity adopted the first of June of each year as a national day to celebrate information technology after a proposal was submitted by the Libyan Technology Foundation.

The Foundation provides professional training for young graduates in the fields of information technology and engineering. The Foundation also cooperates with the Internet Society.

The foundation was mentioned in the report issued by the Internet Assigned Numbers Authority (IANA) on October 30, 2025, among the "local stakeholders with significant interest" who submitted supporting information for the request to transfer the management of the domain to the General Authority of Communications and Informatics (GACI) in Libya. The report described the fondationas as a non-profit organization concerned with representing experts in information technology and computing within the technical community, reflecting the institution’s presence in the national discussion related to the governance and management of the Libyan domain.

== Funding sources ==
The Foundation is funded by several sources, including government and private, both conditional and unconditional, membership fees, and fees in the form of consulting and training services for various entities and companies.
