= Torre Realia BCN =

Skyscraper in Spain

Coordinates: 41°21′23″N 2°07′39″E

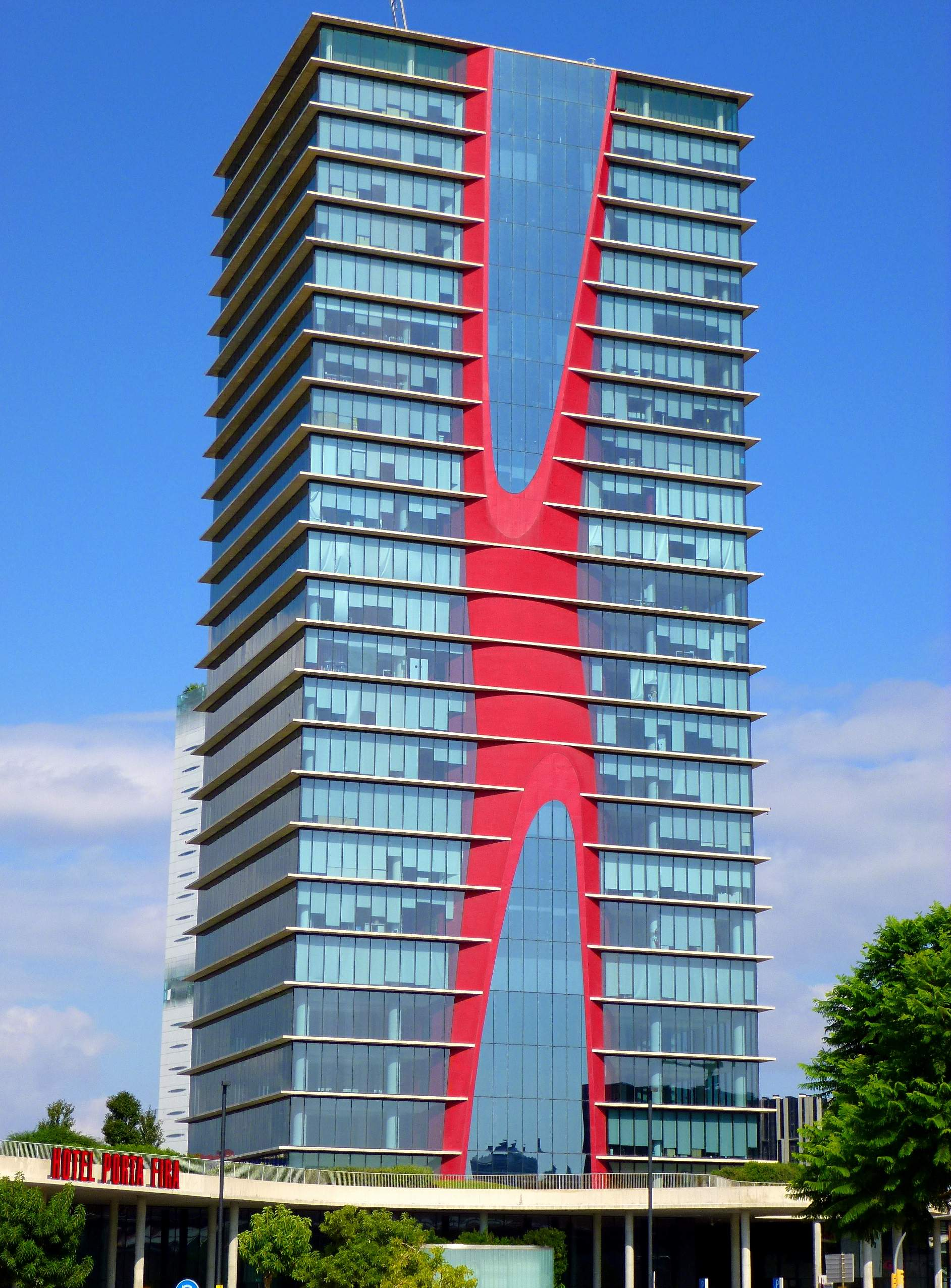
- Torre Realia BCN
- Interactive map of the Torre Realia BCN area

General information
- Status: Completed
- Location: L'Hospitalet de Llobregat, suburb of Barcelona, Spain
- Construction started: June 2006
- Completed: June 2009

Height
- Height: 112 m (367 ft)

Technical details
- Floor count: 24

Design and construction
- Architects: Toyo Ito and b720 Fermin Vazquez Arquitectos

Torre Realia BCN (also Torres de Toyo Ito with Hotel Porta Fira) is a skyscraper on the Plaça d'Europa in the district of Granvia l'Hospitalet in L'Hospitalet de Llobregat, a city of Barcelonès, Catalonia, Spain. Completed in 2009, it has 24 floors and rises 112 meters.

== See also ==
- List of tallest buildings in Barcelona
