= Villa Romana Prize =

German art prize

Coordinates: 43°45′15″N 11°14′21″E

- Villa-Romana-Preis
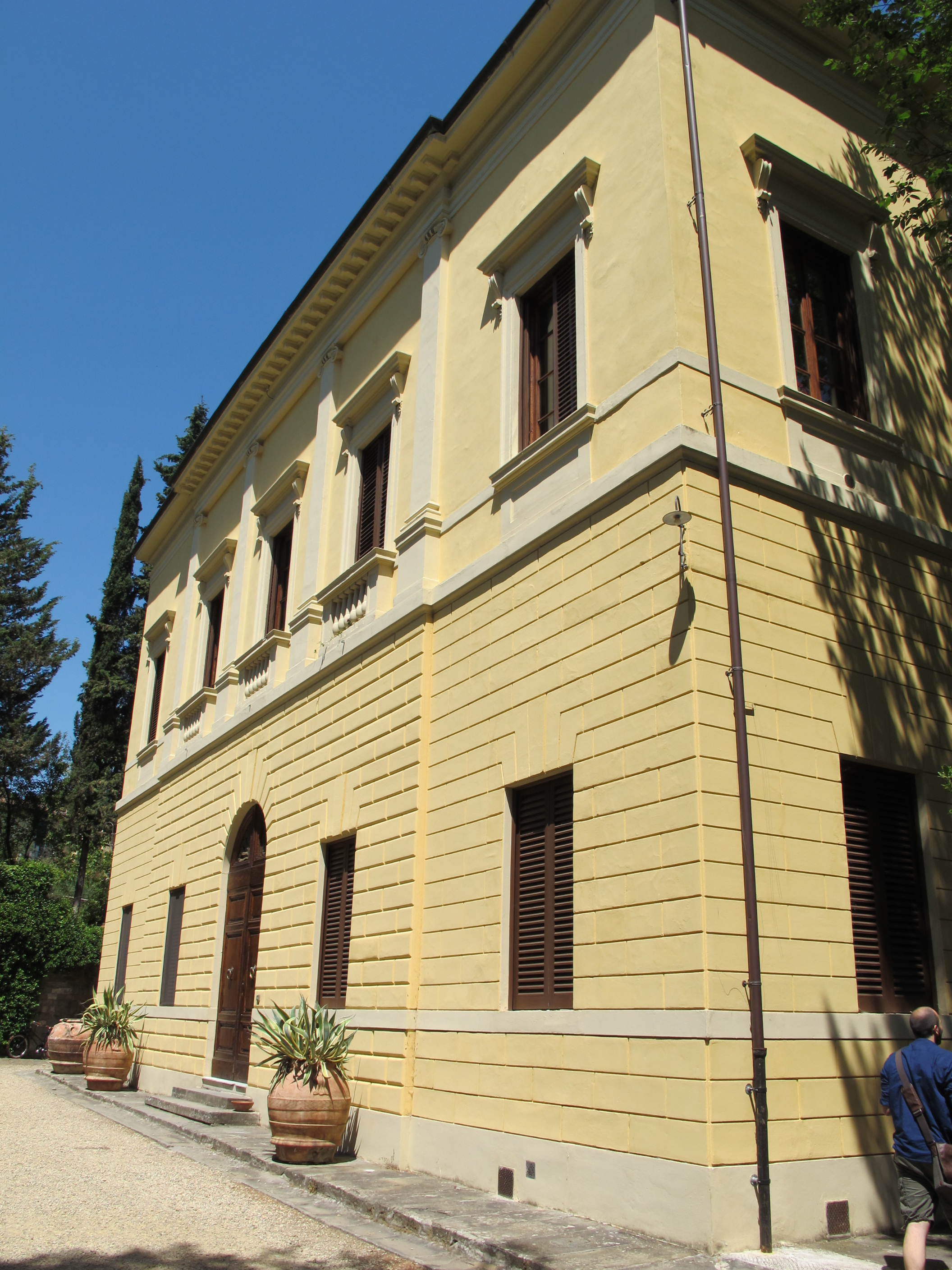
- The villa, seen from the Via Senese
- Awarded for: annual award to visual artists
- Date: 1905
- Location: Villa Romana, Florence
- Country: Italy
- Presented by: Deutscher Künstlerbund
- Reward: one-year artistic residence
- Website: villaromana.org

The Villa Romana Prize, German: Villa-Romana-Preis, is an art prize awarded by the Deutscher Künstlerbund. It was established in 1905 and is the oldest German art award. The prize consists of a one-year artistic residence in the Villa Romana, a nineteenth-century villa on the Via Senese in the southern outskirts of Florence, in Tuscany in central Italy.

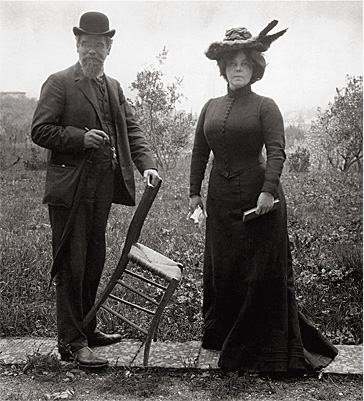
Max Klinger and Elsa Asanijeff in the garden of the villa, April 1905

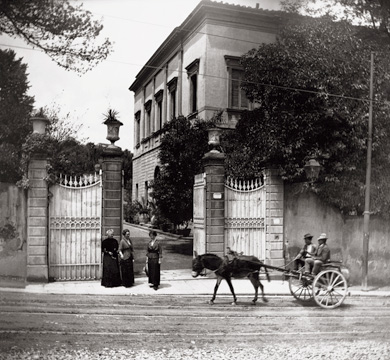
The painter Maria Caspar-Filser with her family in front of the Villa Romana, 1914

Max Klinger, who in 1903 had become vice-president of the Deutscher Künstlerbund, established the Villa Romana as a study centre for artists in 1905. He had bought it that year for 60,000 gold lire. The prize was first awarded in that year also.

Among the many recipients of the award are Max Beckmann (1906), Ernst Barlach (1909), Joseph Fassbender (1929), Gerhard Marcks, Toni Stadler (1937), Walter Stöhrer (1978), and Georg Baselitz (1965).

== Recipients ==
The recipients of the prize have been:

=== 1905 to 1914 ===
- 1905: Ulrich Hübner, Georg Kolbe, Richard Pietzsch, Kurt Tuch, Max Kurzweil
- 1906: Max Beckmann, Dora Hitz, Käthe Kollwitz, Hermann Schlittgen
- 1907: Martin Brandenburg, Georg Burmester, Fritz Mackensen
- 1908: Ernst Barlach, Richard Dreher, Wilhelm Groß, Heinrich Tscharmann
- 1909: Paul Baum, Willi Geiger, Adolf Schinnerer
- 1910: Karl Albiker, Otto Höger, Hans Meid
- 1911: Ludwig Cauer, Otto Höger, Fritz Rhein
- 1912: Theo von Brockhusen, Alexander Gerbig, Georg Greve-Lindau
- 1913: Karl Caspar, Moritz Melzer, Erich Stephany
- 1914: Otto Richard Bossert, Bernhard Hasler, Wilhelm Laage

=== 1928 to 1943 ===
- 1928: Gerhard Marcks
- 1929: Joseph Fassbender
- 1930: Josef Henselmann
- 1931: Franz Xaver Fuhr
- 1932: Hans Christof Drexel
- 1933: John Sass
- 1934: Otto Freytag
- 1935: Philipp Harth, William Maly
- 1936: Emy Roeder, Arthur Degner
- 1937: Toni Stadler
- 1938: Helmut Ruhmer
- 1939: Fritz Bernuth
- 1940: Rudolf Riester
- 1941: Hans Breker, Karl Clobes, Walter Rossler
- 1942: Oscar Kreibich, Hubert Nikolaus Lang, Karl Paul, Egon Schiffers
- 1943: Wilhelm Hausmann, Kurt Lambert, Walter Wichmann

=== From 1959 ===
- 1959: Theo Bechteler, Peter Herkenrath, Carl-Heinz Kliemann, Toni Stadler
- 1960: John Geccelli, Jochen Hiltmann, Guido Jendritzko, Harry Koegler
- 1961: Peter Brüning, Erwin Eichbaum, Wilhelm Hausmann, Wolfgang vom Schemm
- 1962: Horst Antes, Gerson Fehrenbach, Paran G'schrey, Hans Kock
- 1963: Friedrich Karl Gotsch, Günter Ferdinand Ris, Ursula Sax, Horst Skodlerrak
- 1964: Clemens Fischer, Winfred Gaul, Utz Kampmann, Rolf Szymanski
- 1965: Georg Baselitz, Franz Bucher, Rainer Küchenmeister, Ludwig Meidner
- 1966: Hans Baschang, Dietlinde Stengelin, Helmut Sundhaußen, Gota Tellesch
- 1967: Bernd Berner, Buja Bingemer, Horst Lark, Michael Black
- 1968: Franz Bernhard, Rolf-Gunter Dienst, Hildegart Lutze, Gatja Helgart Rothe
- 1969: Henry Brummack, Bernd Damke, Wolf Kahlen, Joachim Schmettau
- 1970: Markus Lüpertz, Ansgar Nierhoff, Michael Schoenholtz, Ben Willikens
- 1971: Peter Ackermann, Hermann Albert, Christa Dichgans, Jürgen Paatz
- 1972: Klaus Fußmann, Edgar Gutbub, Max G. Kaminski, Hansjerg Maier-Aichen
- 1973: Hede Bühl, Nino Malfatti, Jobst Meyer, Hans Peter Reuter
- 1974: Kurt Koch, Christiane Maether, Heinz-Günter Prager, Arthur Stoll
- 1975: Claudia Kinast, Bernd Klötzer, Alf Schuler, Dorothee von Windheim
- 1976: Michael Bette, Michael Buthe, Nikolaus Lang, Bertram Weigel
- 1977: Jakob Mattner, Anna Oppermann, Heinz Schanz, Gottfried Wiegand
- 1978: Abraham David Christian, Elena Engel, Christiane Mobius, Walter Stöhrer
- 1979: Johannes Brus, Friedemann Hahn, Inge Higher, Mechtild Nemeczek
- 1980: Fritz Gilow, Rainer Mang, Reinhard Pods, Gerd Rohling
- 1981: Frank Dornseif, Bruno Erdmann, Dieter Kraemer, Guenter Tužina
- 1982: Gundi Bindernagel, Karl Bohrmann, Marina Makowski, Eva-Maria Schön
- 1983: Martin Rosz, Norbert Tadeusz, Nicole van den Plas, Michael Witlatschil
- 1984: Rolf Behm, Doris Hadersdorfer, George Meissner, Marianne Pohl
- 1985: Cordula Giidemann, Paul Herberg, Sabine Krasel, William Weiner
- 1986: Andreas Bindl, Dietz Eilbacher, Andreas Grunert, Max Neumann
- 1987: Lisa Hoever, Bernd Minnich, Thomas Virnich, Jochen Zellmann, Karl-Heinz Krause
- 1988: Nikifor Brueckner, Gabriela Dauerer, Walter Kütz, Klaus Schmetz
- 1989: Jörg Eberhard, Bernd Jünger, Gisela Kleinlein, Berthold Langnickel
- 1990: Albert Borchardt, Galli (artist), Hermann Josef Mispelbaum, Norbert Radermacher
- 1991: Vera Leutloff, Eberhard Johannes Ambrosius Wagner, Barbara Wille, Carl Emanuel Wolff
- 1992: Sybille Berke, Katharina Grosse, Klaus Gärtner, Bernd Mechler
- 1993: Andreas Bee, Jochem Hendricks, Marko Lehanka, Hans-Willi Notthoff
- 1994: Herbert Barden, Karin Sander, Michel Sauer, Martin Steiner
- 1995: Isa Dahl, Wolfgang Hambrecht, Andreas Sansoni, Jörg Spamer
- 1996: Irene Blume, Christiane Dellbrügge and Ralf de Moll, Maik Löbbert, Dirk Löbbert, Michael Munding
- 1997: Franz Baumgartner, Martin Schmidt, Walter Schreiner, Barbara von Wienskowski
- 1998: Brunner/Ritz, Tobias Gerber, Peter Herrmann, Andreas Schön
- 1999: Heiner Blumenthal, Andreas Bunte, Daniel Knorr, Gregor Schneider, Vincent Tavene
- 2000: Thomas Eller, Michael Kutzner, Simon Vogel, Amelie von Wulffen
- 2002: Simone Böhm, Dorothea Goldschmidt, Stephan Gripp, Dieter Viegen
- 2002: Barbara Heim, Hannes Norberg, Daniela Trixl, Christina Zück
- 2003: Sven-Ole Frahm, Gelke Gaycken, Norbert Kuepper, Markus Vater, Christian Frosch
- 2004: Ralf Brück, Monika Kapfer, Christian Black, Jörg Wagner
- 2005: Robert Klümpen, Alexander Laner, Ulla Irina Rossek, Constantin Wallhäuser
- 2006: Andrea Hanak, Simon Dybbroe Møller, Anna Kerstin Otto, Stefan Thater
- 2007: Andrea Faciu, Barbara Kussinger, Silke Markefka, Michail Pirgelis
- 2008: Dani Gal, Julia Schmidt, Asli Sungu, Clemens von Wedemeyer
- 2009: Olivier Foulon, Kalin Lindena, Eske Schluter, Benjamin Yavuzsoy
- 2010: Anna Heidenhain, Sebastian Dacey, Anna Möller, Martin Pfeifle
- 2011: Nora Schultz, Rebecca Ann Tess, Vincent Vulsma, Thomas Kilpper, Henrik Olesen
- 2012: Nine Budde, Wolfgang Breuer, Sophie Reinhold, Yorgos Sapountzis
- 2013: Shannon Bool, Heide Hinrichs, Daniel Maier-Reimer, Mariechen Danz
- 2014: Ei Arakawa, Natalie Czech, Loretta Fahrenholz, Petrit Halilaj, Sergei Tcherepnin, Alvaro Urbano
- 2015: Alisa Margolis, Johannes Paul Raether, Judith Raum, Anike Joyce Sadiq
- 2016: Flaka Haliti, Stefan Vogel, Nico Joana Weber, Jonas Weichsel
- 2017: Andrea Bellu, Matei Bellu, Carina Brandes, Kasia Fudakowski, Stefan Pente, Farkhondeh Shahroudi
- 2018: Jeewi Lee, Christophe Ndabananiye, Lerato Shadi, Viron Erol Vert
- 2019: KAYA, Marcela Moraga, Christian Naujoks, Rajkamal Kahlon
- 2020: Özlem Altin, Lydia Hamann and Kaj Osteroth, Alice Peragine, Amelia Umuhire
- 2021: Pauline Curnier Jardin, Lene Markusen, Musa Michelle Mattiuzzi, Giuseppe Stampone
- 2022: Haure Madjid, Jasmina Metwaly, Neda Saeedi, Alexander Skorobogatov
- 2023: Diana Ejaita, Jessica Ekomane, Samuel Baah Kortey, Pınar Öğrenci
- 2024: Rubén D’hers, Tuli Mekondjo, Monai de Paula Antunes, Sergio Zevallos
- 2025: Sajan Mani, Elia Nurvista, Chaveli Sifre, Raul Walch
- 2026: Charmaine Poh, Mikolaj Sobczak, Susanne Sachsse, and Gulbin Unlu

== See also ==
- List of European art awards
