= Sammlung Grässlin =

Art collection in Germany

Coordinates: 48°07′36″N 8°20′08″E

The Sammlung Grässlin is an art collection in Germany. The works can be seen in its museum in Sankt Georgen (Schwarzwald).

== Artists in the collection ==
Werner Büttner, Fischli & Weiss, Günther Förg, Isa Genzken, Asta Gröting, Georg Herold, Mike Kelley, Hubert Kiecol, Martin Kippenberger, Michael Krebber, Meuser, Reinhard Mucha, Albert Oehlen, Markus Oehlen, Franz West, Christopher Williams, Heimo Zobernig, Kai Althoff, Cosima von Bonin, Clegg & Guttmann, Mark Dion, Hans-Jörg Mayer, Christian Philipp Müller, Manuel Ocampo, Tobias Rehberger, Andreas Slominski, Vincent Tavenne, Ina Weber, Joseph Zehrer, Tim Berresheim, Michael Beutler, Henning Bohl, Tom Burr, Sergej Jensen, Kalin Lindena, Michaela Meise, Simon Dybbroe Møller, Stefan Müller, Catherine Sullivan, Stephanie Taylor, Jan Timme
