= Loretta Fahrenholz =

German artist (born 1981)

- Born: 1981 (age 44–45); Starnberg, Germany
- Education: Academy of Visual Arts, Leipzig, Germany
- Known for: Film and Photography

Loretta Fahrenholz (1981 in Starnberg, Germany) is a contemporary artist working in experimental film and photography. She is based in Berlin, Germany.

== Early life and education ==
Fahrenholz graduated from the Academy of Visual Arts in Leipzig, Germany in 2007.

== Career ==
Fahrenholz is primarily known for the filmic works she calls "performative documentaries." These films frequently meld genres, and she frequently works in collaboration with her actors. Her work thematically unpacks the contradictions of various social milieus, everyday habits, and contemporary urban life.

She is best known for her video Ditch Plains (2013) which depicts the East New York dance group The Ringmasters Crew as they perform among the post-apolcalyptic landscape of Brooklyn following Hurricane Sandy.

== Work ==
=== Major exhibitions ===
Fahrenholz's first institutional solo exhibition entitled 3 Frauen was held at the Kunsthalle Zürich in 2015. The exhibition included, among others, her well-known experimental video Ditch Plains (2013), along with Implosion (2011), a film that adapted poet Kathy Acker's play of the same name. It also featured her recent experiments producing photographs using various technologies such as smartphones and 3D point scanners. Cultural theorist Sadie Plant writes that Fahrenholz's works in this exhibition "...conjure up a sense of terrible emptiness as they explore the horrors of disembodiment, domestic and urban disconnection and the disquieting limits of role-play and make-believe."

Fahrenholz has had numerous solo exhibitions, among others at Galerie Buchholz (since 2011), Midway Contemporary Art (2015), Fridericianum, Kassel / Stedelijk Museum, Amsterdam (2016), mumok (2018), Company Gallery (2020), Neuer Berliner Kunstverein, Lumiar Cité (2021), and Kölnischer Kunstverein (2022).

=== Public collections ===
- Museum of Modern Art
- Stedelijk Museum Amsterdam
- Kadist
- Stoschek collection
- Mumok
- Museum Ludwig
- Whitney Museum of American Art

== Recognition ==
Fahrenholz was awarded the Villa Romana Prize in 2014.
