= ZKM Center for Art and Media Karlsruhe =

Cultural institution in Karlsruhe, Germany

ZKM | Center for Art and Media Karlsruhe
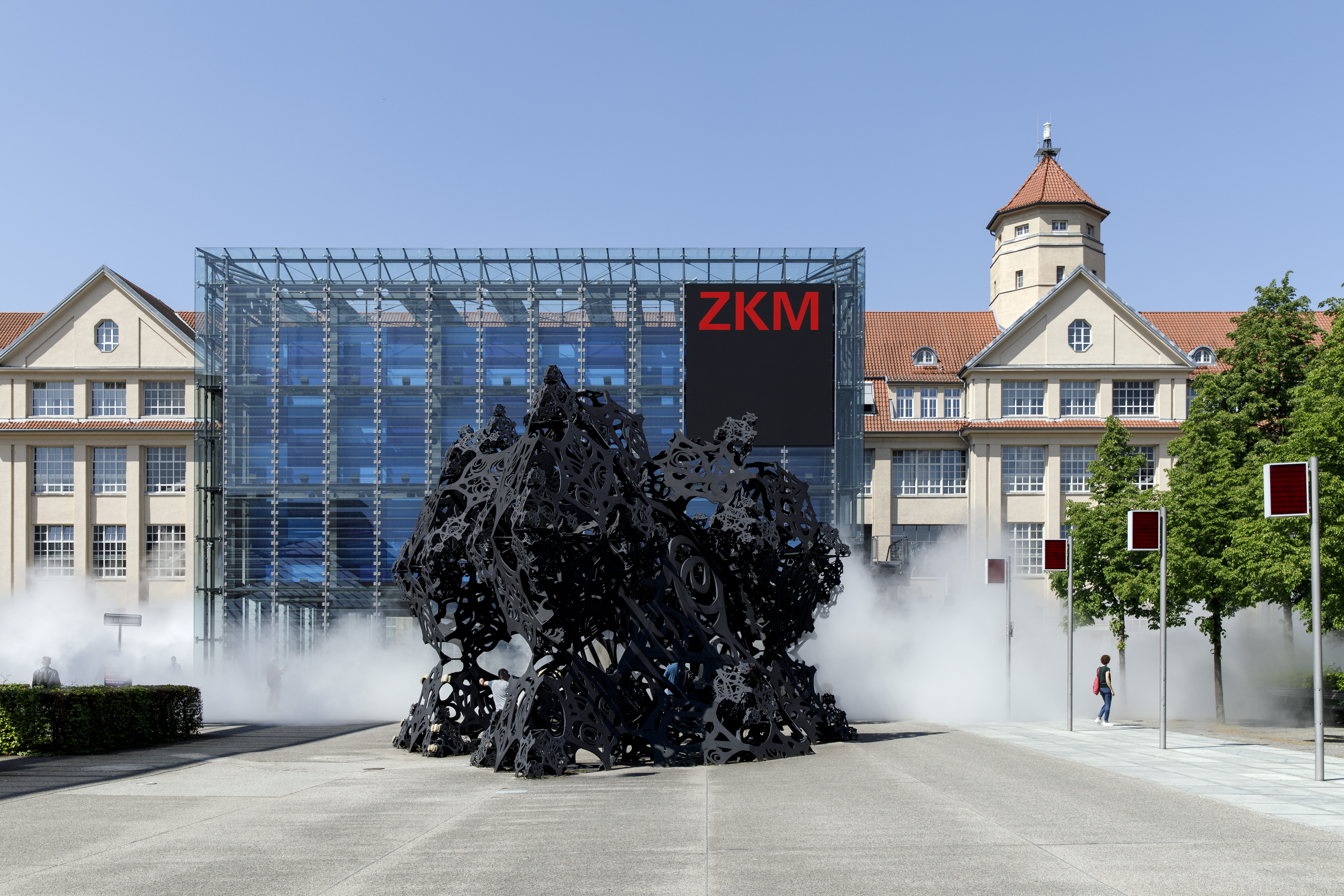
- Panorama view of the ZKM – here with fog sculpture CLOUD WALK @ZKM by Fujiko Nakaya
- Established: 1997
- Location: Karlsruhe, Germany
- Coordinates: 49°00′05″N 8°23′01″E
- Directors: Alistair Hudson, Holger Neinhaus
- Website: zkm.de/en

The ZKM | Center for Art and Media Karlsruhe (until March 2016: ZKM Center for Art and Media Technology), a cultural institution, was founded in 1989 and, since 1997, is located in a former munitions factory in Karlsruhe, Germany. The ZKM (German: Zentrum für Kunst und Medien) organizes special exhibitions and thematic events, conducts research and produces works on the effects of media, digitization, and globalization, and offers public as well as individualized communications and educational programs.

The ZKM houses under one roof exhibition spaces, the research platform Hertz Lab, a library and a media library, thus combining research and production, exhibitions and events, archive and collection. The ZKM operates at the interface of art and science, and addresses new knowledge in the area of new technologies to develop it further. After the death of founding director Heinrich Klotz (1935–1999), the ZKM was directed by Peter Weibel (1999–2023), later together with Christiane Riedel. Weibel died on 1 March 2023, weeks before his planned retirement on 31 March 2023. He was succeeded on 1 April 2023 by the British curator Alistair Hudson. Besides the ZKM, the former munitions factory also houses the associated Karlsruhe University of Arts and Design, and the Städtische Galerie Karlsruhe [Municipal Art Gallery of Karlsruhe].

== Mission ==
"The mission of the ZKM is to explore the creative possibilities of connecting the traditional arts and media technologies to achieve innovative results. The goal is to enrich the arts, not to amputate them by technical means. This is why traditional art and media art must compete with one another. The ZKM is a place which supports both – each for itself and together. The Bauhaus, founded in Weimar in 1919, can be regarded as its model." – Heinrich Klotz

The ZKM's mission as formulated by founding director Heinrich Klotz in 1992 was implemented and developed further in the years that followed. Today, following guiding ideas mainly inform the work of the ZKM:

- The ZKM is a location for all forms of contemporary art.
- As a center for research and development on theory and practice, the ZKM brings together artists, scholars, and scientists from a variety of disciplines.
- Through collecting and safeguarding works of art and historical equipment, as well as building a comprehensive archive of twentieth and twenty-first century arts, the ZKM is a preserver of cultural heritage. Here, the conservation of "digital art" is accorded special importance.

== History ==
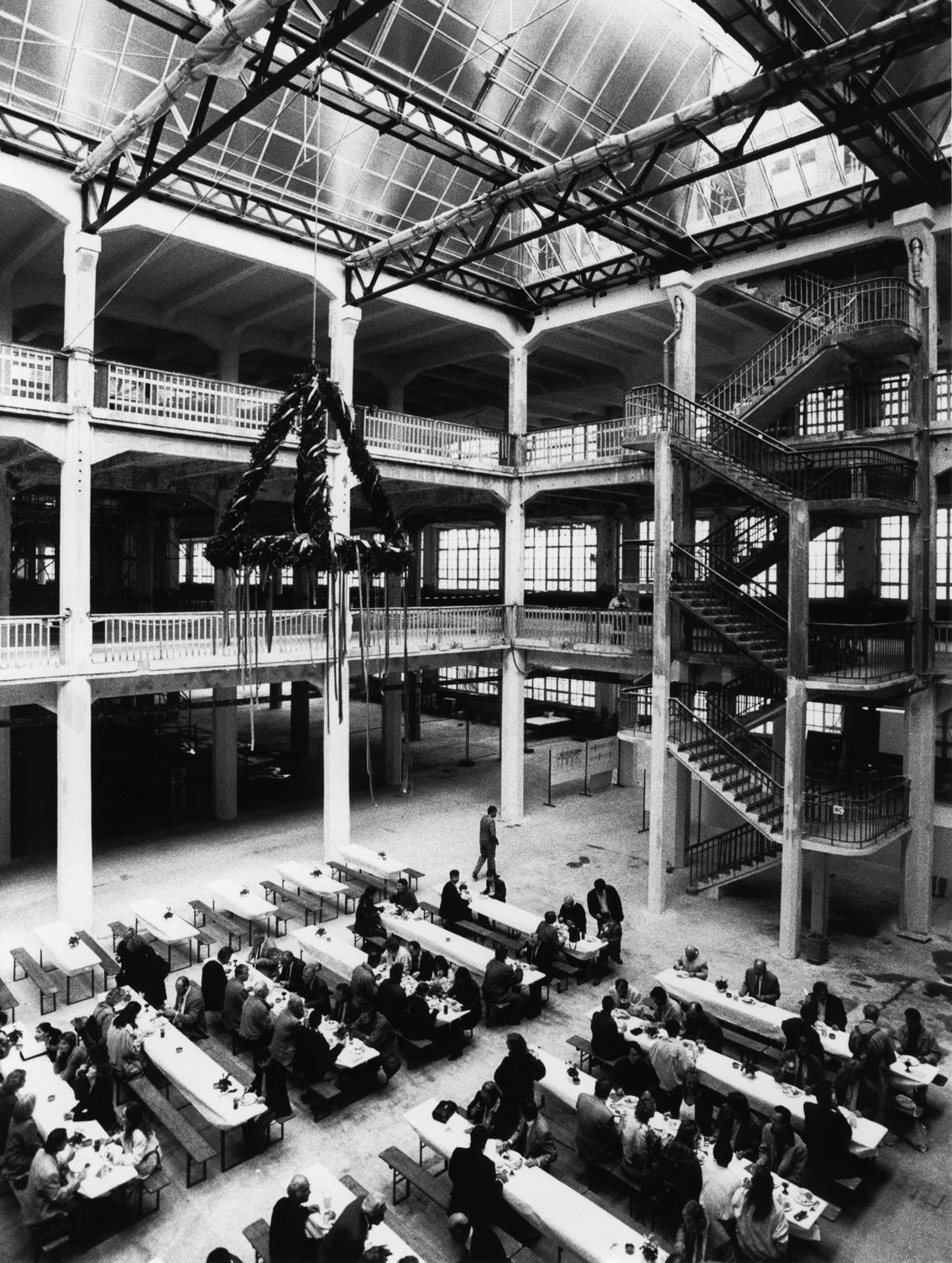
Founding & History: Topping-out ceremony of the ZKM in September 1995

The founding of the Center for Art and Media goes back to the early 1980s. In the context of an ever-expanding media landscape and a changing art world, representatives from local government, the University of Karlsruhe, the University of Music Karlsruhe, the Kernforschungszentrum Karlsruhe [Center for Nuclear Research Karlsruhe] and other institutions, as well as organizations and representatives of the Karlsruhe art scene formed the ZKM Project Group in 1986. In February 1988 the ZKM Project Group presented the results of their work, titled Concept ‘88, which described the initiative to bring the arts and the new media together in both theory and practice.

With the founding of a board of trustees in 1989 and the appointment of Heinrich Klotz as founding director, the ZKM became a concrete reality. Three dates mark the ZKM's foundation: the local council's resolution dated May 9, 1989; the decision by the Council of Ministers of the State of Baden-Württemberg dated 3 June 1989; and the entry into force of its statutes on 12 August 1989. To begin with, the ZKM occupied various buildings around the city. Prior to moving to its present location, the ZKM's media art festival MultiMediale (MultiMediale 1–5, 1989–1997) was held at changing locations.

For a considerable time, the ZKM's future permanent location was envisaged in an area to the south of Karlsruhe Central Station. An international architecture competition for a new building on the site was announced in March 1989, from which a visionary design by Dutch architect Rem Koolhaas resulted. However, construction of the so-called Koolhaas-Cube was abandoned in 1992 for reasons of costs and space and instead, a disused factory building would be converted. Karlsruhe Council opted for repurposing Hallenbau A [Hall A], built 1914–1918 by architect Philipp Jakob Manz as a weapons and munitions factory, which was then an industrial ruin. The building, 312 meters long and divided into ten atria, was on the former factory site of the Industriewerke Karlsruhe-Augsburg (IWKA), which had been an industrial brownfields since the 1970s in the south-west of Karlsruhe that separated the city center from the surrounding urban areas. The conversion, based on plans drawn up by the Hamburg office of Schweger Architects, and the construction of the blue Cube annex inspired by Koolhaas's original design, commenced in 1993. When the ZKM moved to its new premises in 1997 it had studios and institutes for research and production (Institute for Visual Media, Institute for Music and Acoustics), a media theater, spaces for concerts and events, a media center, a Mediathek, and a Media Museum. In the second construction phase, the rooms housing the Museum of Contemporary Art (moved in 1999) and the associated Karlsruhe University of Arts and Design (moved in 2001) were completed. From 2004 to 2005 the formerly independent Museum of Contemporary Art was reintegrated into the ZKM. In March 2016 the ZKM Center for Art and Media Technology changed its name to ZKM Center for Art and Media.

=== ZKM | Media Museum ===
The central concerns of the Media Museum turn on the history and critique of the new media, which have been transforming the forms of everyday life for the past 50 years. Computer, telephone and Internet intervene in social and individual lives in that technical components become increasingly important. A further focus of the Media Museum is the interaction between observer and work of art: only through the actions and reactions of every single visitor do works actually emerge – the visitor itself becomes an element in the installation and, in this way, is able to explore the treatment with new technologies. With works of media art and interactive installations artists and scientists question media-technological developments and visions. Temporary exhibitions, such as "net_condition. Art/Politics in the Online Universe" (September 1999 to February 2000), "Iconoclash. Beyond Image Wars in Science, Religion and Art" (from May to September, 2002) or "bit international" (February 2008 to January 2009) were highly respected both nationally and abroad.

=== ZKM | Museum of Contemporary Art ===
Since December 1999, the Museum of Contemporary Art has been located in the atrium 1 and 2 of the former munitions factory. Across 7.000 sqm exhibition space, the museum displays works from private collections, namely the FER COLLECTION, the Sammlung Grässlin [Grässlin Collection], the Sammlung Siegfried Weishaupt [Weishaupt Collection], the collection of the Landesbank Baden-Württemberg, VAF-Stiftung / Museo di arte moderna e contemporanea di Trento e Rovereto [VAF Foundation / Museum of Modern and Contemporary Art of Trento and Rovereto] (MART), as well as the Boros Collection, together with exponents drawn from the ZKM Collection and further collaborating collections. Temporary exhibitions, above all from the second half of the twentieth centuries through to contemporary approaches in contemporary art are presented. Among others monographic exhibitions, on Bruce Nauman, Bill Viola, Sigmar Polke, Franz West, Sylvie Fleury, Martin Kippenberger and Tobias Rehberger have been taking place since 1999. Special, thematic exhibitions were, inter alia "Making Things Public. Atmospheres of Democracy" (March to October, 2005), "Light Art from Artificial Light" (November 2005 to August 2006), "Medium Religion" (November 2008 till April 2009) or "The Global Contemporary. Art Worlds after 1989" (September 2011 to February 2012). Furthermore, smaller scale exhibitions are held in the museum project spaces.

=== Events ===
The form and content of events vary: from opera with multimedial stages to scientific symposia and popular concerts through to performances, dance or film-screenings. Here, the ZKM functions both as an organizer and cooperation partner, but also leases out its facilities. The events take place in various spaces, among others, the Lecture Hall, the Media Theater, the Foyer and the ZKM_Cube.

== The ZKM ==
The ZKM | Karlsruhe has a total area of 15,000 m^{2} with exhibition spaces, research laboratories, a media library, event spaces, and workshop spaces.

Exhibitions

- Atrium 1 & 2
- Atrium 8 & 9
- PanoLab
- Subraum

Research and production

- Hertz Lab
- Lab for Antiquated Video Systems

Event spaces

- Media Theater
- Lecture Hall

Workshop rooms

- BÄMlab

The exhibition spaces are open to the public as well as the library and the Media Lounge. Further, in the foyer of the ZKM visitors will find the Info Point, the Museum Shop, and the Mint Café/Bistro.

== Funding ==
The basic funding of the ZKM is provided in equal parts by the City of Karlsruhe and the State of Baden-Württemberg.

== Exhibitions and events ==
In exhibitions and events, the ZKM shows approaches and themes of contemporary art, but also presents artists and art movements that are almost forgotten, as well as artworks in various media and genres – from Artificial Intelligence installations to oil paintings.

Every year, on 6 January, the ZKM and the Städtische Galerie hold an Open Day where admission is free of charge.

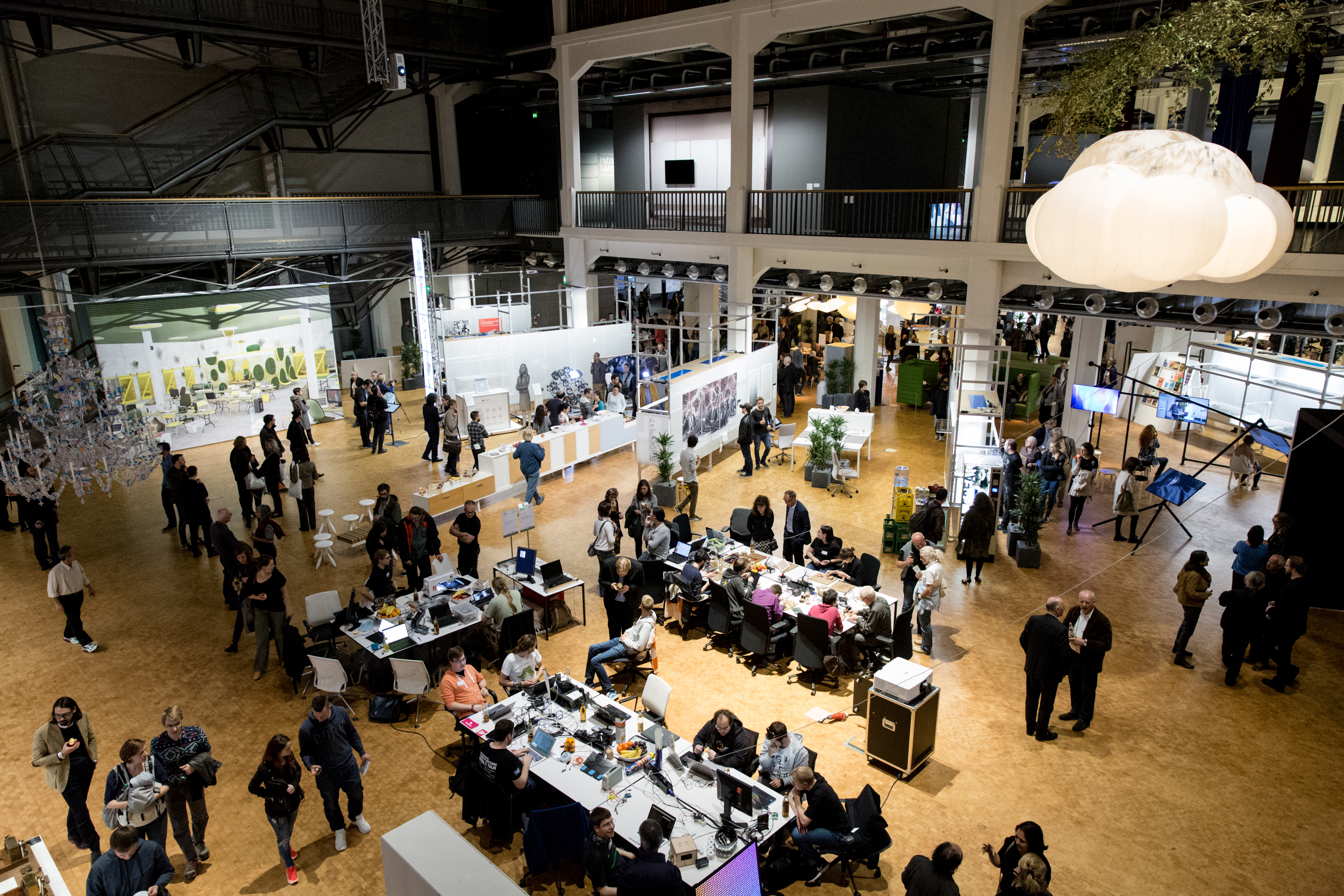
View into the exhibition "Open Codes. The World as a Field of Data" at ZKM

=== Exhibitions ===
Since 1989 the ZKM | Karlsruhe has been mounting exhibitions – interactive, participatory, and performative – as well as producing the accompanying publications. In changing thematic and monographic exhibitions organized in the ZKM's 15,000 m^{2} exhibition spaces, contemporary developments in art and society are presented in all types of media and using all kinds of methods.

The ZKM’s curatorial department develops its exhibition programme in collaboration with the board of directors, its laboratories and research departments, partner institutions worldwide, and an international network of artists, scholars, scientists and curators.

The ZKM is involved in a large number of international collaborative projects, which enables the ZKM's exhibitions and their content to be made available to a global audience. The own exhibitions curated by the ZKM are regularly presented internationally. In 2018, 20 ZKM exhibitions were on show at locations around the world, including in Poland, Lithuania, Latvia, Hungary, the Philippines, India, South Korea, and China.

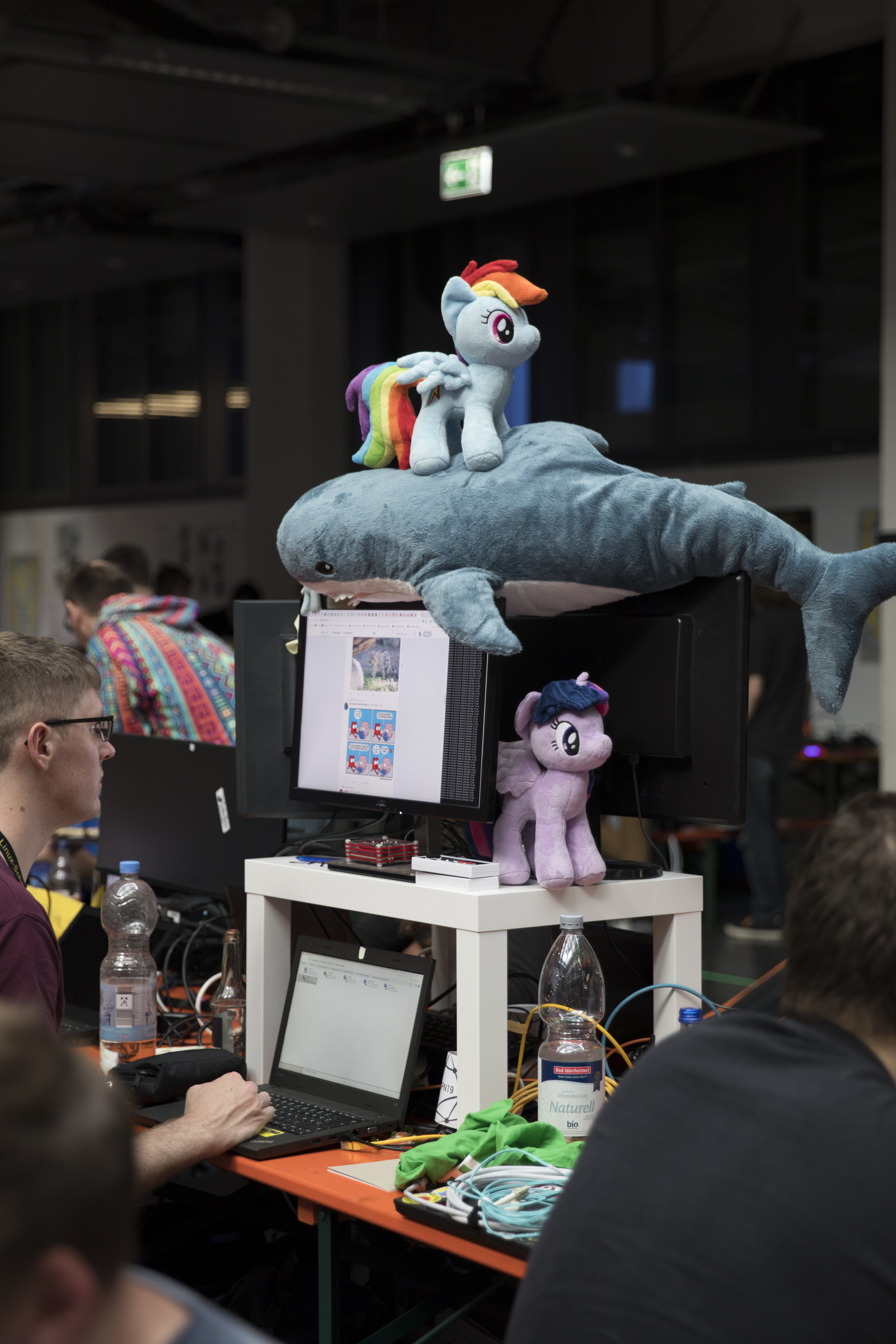
Impression of the 19th GPN (Gulaschprogrammiernacht) at ZKM

In 2018, CryptoKitties was used by the ZKM Center for Art and Media Karlsruhe to showcase blockchain technology.

=== Events ===
Alongside the exhibitions, events take place as platforms for exchanging opinions and information with visitors and figures from various spheres of social life such as politics, the economy, and philosophy. The form and content of the events vary: from opera with a multimedia stage, scientific symposia, and popular concerts to performances, dance, and film screenings. Here, the ZKM functions both as an organizer and collaboration partner, and also as a contact for leasing out its facilities. The events take place in various spaces, for example, the Lecture Hall, the Media Theater, the Foyer, and the ZKM Cube.

Since 2014 the Gulash Programming Night has been held at the ZKM and the HfG. This four-day conference of the German and international hacker scene is organized by the Karlsruhe branch of the Chaos Computer Club. The ZKM contributes lectures to Gulash Programming Night event and organizes special tours.

From 2011 to 2017 the ZKM conferred the AppArtAward annually together with Cyberforum e.V., CAS Software AG, and other partners. The AppArtAward was conferred on apps that are artworks and combine creative aspects and use of technological possibilities. The competition had various categories, each with a prize of €10,000. Categories included Prize for Artistic Innovation, Special Prize for Crowd Art, and Special Prize for Art and Science.

== Research and production ==
The ZKM's research institutes develop transdisciplinary projects. Research is partly conducted by the ZKM, and partly in collaboration with other education and research institutions. The goal is to analyze and trial the latest technologies to determine their applicability and relevance for art and the information society, which is increasingly connected on a global scale and communicates online.

=== Hertz Lab ===
The Hertz Lab was established in 2017. It combines the Institute for Visual Media and the Institute for Music and Acoustics.

The main activities of the Hertz Lab are art production and research on media technology. Contemporary concepts – for example, artificial intelligence (AI), augmented reality (AR) in virtual reality (VR) and AR applications, immersive or sensor-based environments, and investigating the artistic potential of electromagnetic fields – are considered across genres and media, examined in terms of their artistic applicability, and realized in productions.

The name Hertz Lab refers to the German physicist Heinrich Hertz.

== Archives and collections ==
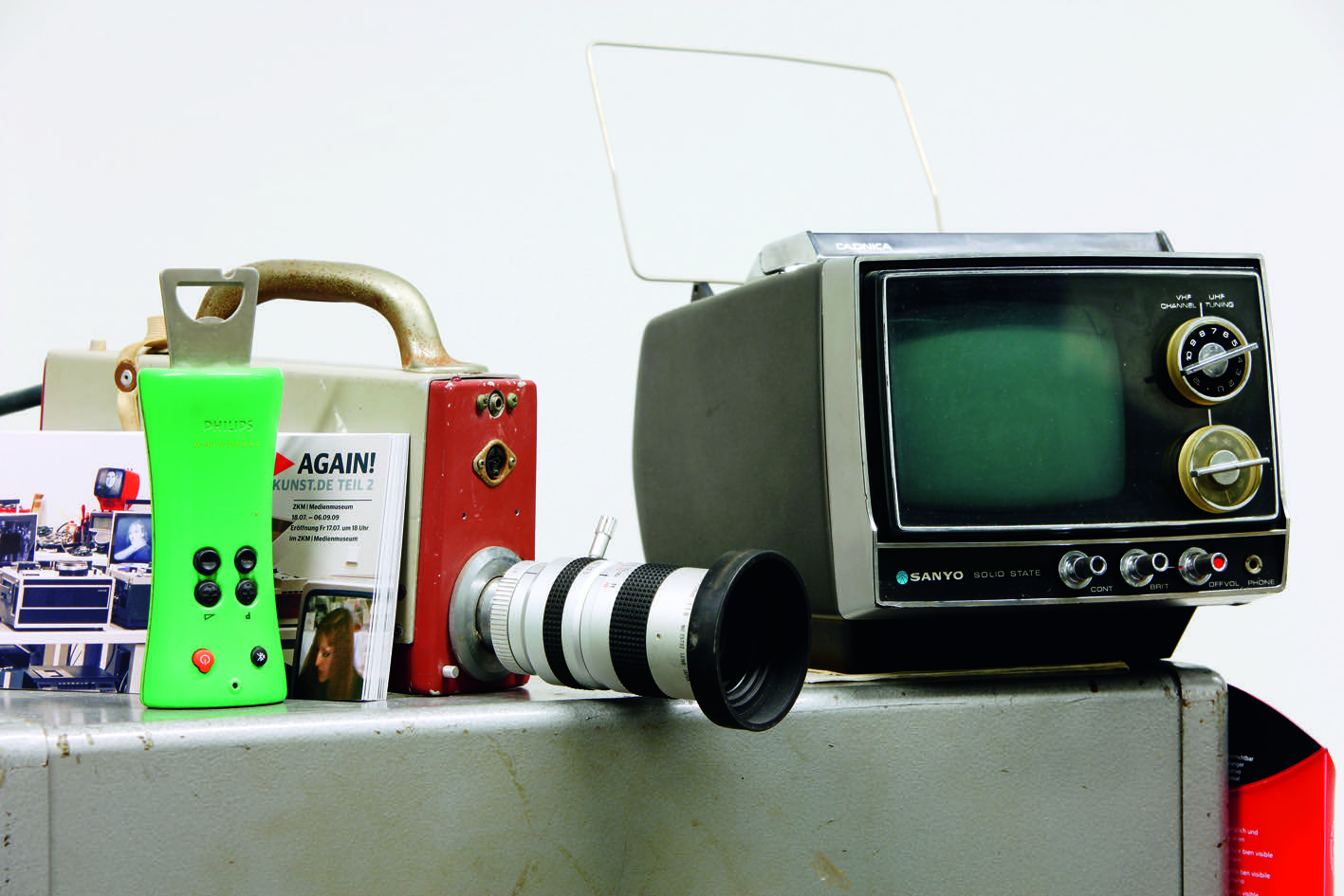
A Modern Noah's Ark for Media Art, The Laboratory for Antiquated Video Systems of the ZKM

The ZKM Collection was founded by the ZKM's first director, Heinrich Klotz, in the early 1990s and has been added to ever since. The collection is based on a specific approach to the different art genres and media: whereas painting and sculpture were hermetically sealed off from the new influences of video art and photography which were gradually establishing themselves, the ZKM's collecting activity is distinguished by transcending such traditional genre divisions. While the Museum of Contemporary Art's collection contained artworks of all genres from the very beginning, the Media Museum's collection initially only contained works of interactive media art most of which were produced in-house. Over 500 international guest artists produced a vast number of works at the ZKM, which entered the ZKM Collection after their initial presentation in Karlsruhe. Consequently, the ZKM has one of the largest collections of media art in the world, extending back to the beginning of video art, electronic installations, and holography. In addition to these there is the collection of approximately 1,200 art videos and 13,800 audio tracks, which are not stored in the museum, but can be accessed via the ZKM | Media Library.

The Video Collection was one of the first of its kind in Germany, and helped to raise public awareness of video as an independent art form. The collection contains works of video art from the 1960s, 1970s, and 1980s, and other works, such as the video magazine Infermental. Through the work of the Laboratory for Antiquated Video Systems, which is connected to the Media Library, it has been possible to rescue extensive video collections in Europe and the US from degenerating, and make them accessible to the public.

The Audio Collection contains contemporary music with an emphasis on electroacoustic music. In addition to audio recordings, the collection includes scores, specialist publications, historic photographs, and posters. Of especial importance is the International Digital Electro-acoustic Music Archive (IDEAMA), which includes pieces of electro-acoustic music from its beginnings through to the present.

In addition to works of video art and electronic music, the ZKM acquires archives and documents on the electronic arts, that is, on video art, electroacoustic music, computer art, and inter-media art forms.

The joint library of the ZKM and the Karlsruhe University of Arts and Design (HfG) has holdings of approximately 60,000 books, journals, and digital storage media. Thematically, it concentrates on twentieth and twenty-first century art and, first and foremost, on media art, architecture, design, media theory, film, photography, and electroacoustic music. The library's entire holdings can be researched via the Internet.

== Publications ==
In collaboration with publishers, the ZKM publishes exhibition catalogs and specialist works on the monographic and thematic exhibitions.

ZKM Publications (a selection):

- Peter Weibel, ed., Negativer Raum. Trajectories of Sculpture in the 20th and 21st Centuries, ZKM | Karlsruhe; MIT Press, Cambridge (Mass.), 2021
- Bruno Latour, Peter Weibel, eds., Critical Zones. The Science and Politics of Landing on Earth, ZKM | Karlsruhe; MIT Press, Cambridge (Mass.), 2020.
- Peter Weibel, eds., Beuys Brock Vostell. Aktion. Partizipation. Performance 1949–1983, ZKM Zentrum für Kunst und Medientechnologie, Karlsruhe: Hatje Cantz, 2014, ISBN 978-3-7757-3864-4.
- Hans Belting, Jacob Birken, Andrea Buddensieg, and Peter Weibel, eds., Global Studies: Mapping Contemporary Art and Culture, ZKM | Karlsruhe; Hantje Cantz, Ostfildern 2011.
- Peter Weibel, ed., Car Culture: Medien der Mobilität, ZKM Zentrum für Kunst und Medientechnologie, Karlsruhe 2011, ISBN 978-3-9282-0142-1.
- Christoph Blase and Peter Weibel, eds., Record again! 40jahrevideokunst.de Teil 2. Hantje Cantz, Ostfildern 2010. Edition of the exhibition at ZKM: July 17 – September 6, 2009.
- Gregor Jansen and Thomas Thiel, eds., Vertrautes Terrain: aktuelle Kunst in & über Deutschland (Contemporary Art in & about Germany), ZKM | Karlsruhe, Heidelberg: Kehrer Verlag, 2009. Exhibition at ZKM: May 22 – October 12, 2008.
- Harald Falckenberg and Peter Weibel, eds., Paul Thek. The Artist's Artist, Cambridge, MA: MIT Press, 2009. Edition of the exhibition at ZKM: December 15, 2007 – March 30, 2008.
- Peter Weibel and Andrea Buddensieg, eds., Contemporary Art and the Museum: A Global Perspective, ZKM | Karlsruhe; Ostfildern: Hatje Cantz, 2007
- Peter Weibel and Gregor Jansen, eds., Light Art from Artificial Light. Light as Medium in 20th and 21st Century Art, ZKM Karlsruhe; Ostfildern: Hatje Cantz, 2007. Exhibition "Lichtkunst aus Kunstlicht" at ZKM: November 19, 2005 – August 6, 2006.
- Bruno Latour and Peter Weibel, eds., Making Things Public. Atmospheres of Democracy, ZKM | Karlsruhe; Cambridge, Massachusetts: MIT Press, 2005. Exhibition at ZKM: March 20 – October 3, 2005.
- Jeffrey Shaw and Peter Weibel, eds., Future Cinema. The Cinematic Imaginary After Film. ZKM | Karlsruhe; Cambridge, Massachusetts: MIT Press, 2003. Exhibition at ZKM: November 16, 2002 – March 30, 2003.

Publications about the ZKM (a selection):

- Peter Weibel and Christiane Riedel, eds., ZKM Guide 1989–2009, ZKM | Karlsruhe, 2010, ISBN 978-3-928201-40-7
- Jörg Reimann and Peter Weibel, eds., 99,9% und mehr : Künstler-Gruppenprojekte "vor" dem ZKM, Karlsruhe, 2009, ISBN 978-3-928201-37-7
- Hans-Peter Schwarz, ed., Medien-Kunst-Geschichte, Munich: Prestel, 1997, ISBN 3-7913-1836-5
- Heinrich Klotz, ed., Kunst der Gegenwart, Munich: Prestel, 1997 ISBN 3-7913-1835-7
- Eckart Hannmann, "Umbau der ehemaligen Waffen- und Munitionsfabrik in Karlsruhe zu einem Kunst- und Medienzentrum", Denkmalpflege in Baden-Württemberg, 27, no. 2 (1998): 66ff. (PDF)

== Film ==
- Museum tour with Markus Brock: Das ZKM Karlsruhe. First screened on 3sat, 14 July 2013
