= Kimberly Phillips =

Kimberly Phillips is a writer, educator and curator in Vancouver, British Columbia, Canada. She is Director of SFU Galleries at Simon Fraser University.

== Career ==
Phillips holds a Ph.D. in Art History, Visual Art & Theory from the University of British Columbia. She has taught at the undergraduate and graduate levels, often teaching curatorial practice and the history of modern and contemporary visual art at Emily Carr University of Art + Design (ECUAD) and the University of British Columbia (UBC) . Phillips is Sessional Faculty at ECUAD and is Course Leader for the Low Residence Masters of Applied Art program. Phillips has authored numerous articles and exhibition catalogues on contemporary art and artists. Her writings have appeared in Artforum, Canadian Art Magazine, and Fillip.

Phillips was Director/Curator at Access Gallery (2013–2017), where she curated several exhibitions, including Some Spontaneous Particulars: Vanessa Brown, Heide Hinrichs, Kathleen Ritter on emerging artists, working both nationally and internationally. In addition, at Access she initiated Twenty-Three Days at Sea: Travelling Artist Residency. Phillips has also held positions such as interpretation coordinator for the Vancouver Art Gallery and curatorial resident at 221A.

From 2017 to 2020 she was the Curator of the Contemporary Art Gallery. Vancouver, a non-profit public art gallery. In 2020, she was appointed as the Director of SFU Galleries at Simon Fraser University. In 2022, she was one of the writers contributing to Althea Thauberger's publication, The State of the Situation.
