= Stephanie Taylor =

Stephanie Taylor may refer to:

- Stephanie Taylor (American artist) (born 1971), works in sculpture, illustration, sound and performance
- Stephanie Taylor (Australian artist) (1899–1974), Australian artist and printmaker
- Stephanie Taylor (activist), political activist and author

== See also ==
- Stafanie Taylor (born 1991), Jamaican cricketer
