= Umuhire =

Umuhire is a Rwandan surname. Notable people with the surname include:

- Adrie Umuhire, Rwandan politician, member of the Third legislature of the Rwandan Senate
- Amelia Umuhire (born 1991), Rwandan-German film director
- Eliane Umuhire (born 1986), Rwandan-French actress
