= Thater =

Thater is a surname. Notable people with the surname include:

- Diana Thater (born 1962), American artist, curator, writer, and educator
- Katja Thater (born 1966), German professional poker player and horse breeder
- Stefan Thater (born 1968), German artist

== See also ==
- Gerhard Thäter (1916–2004), German naval officer
