= Władysław Szerner =

Polish painter

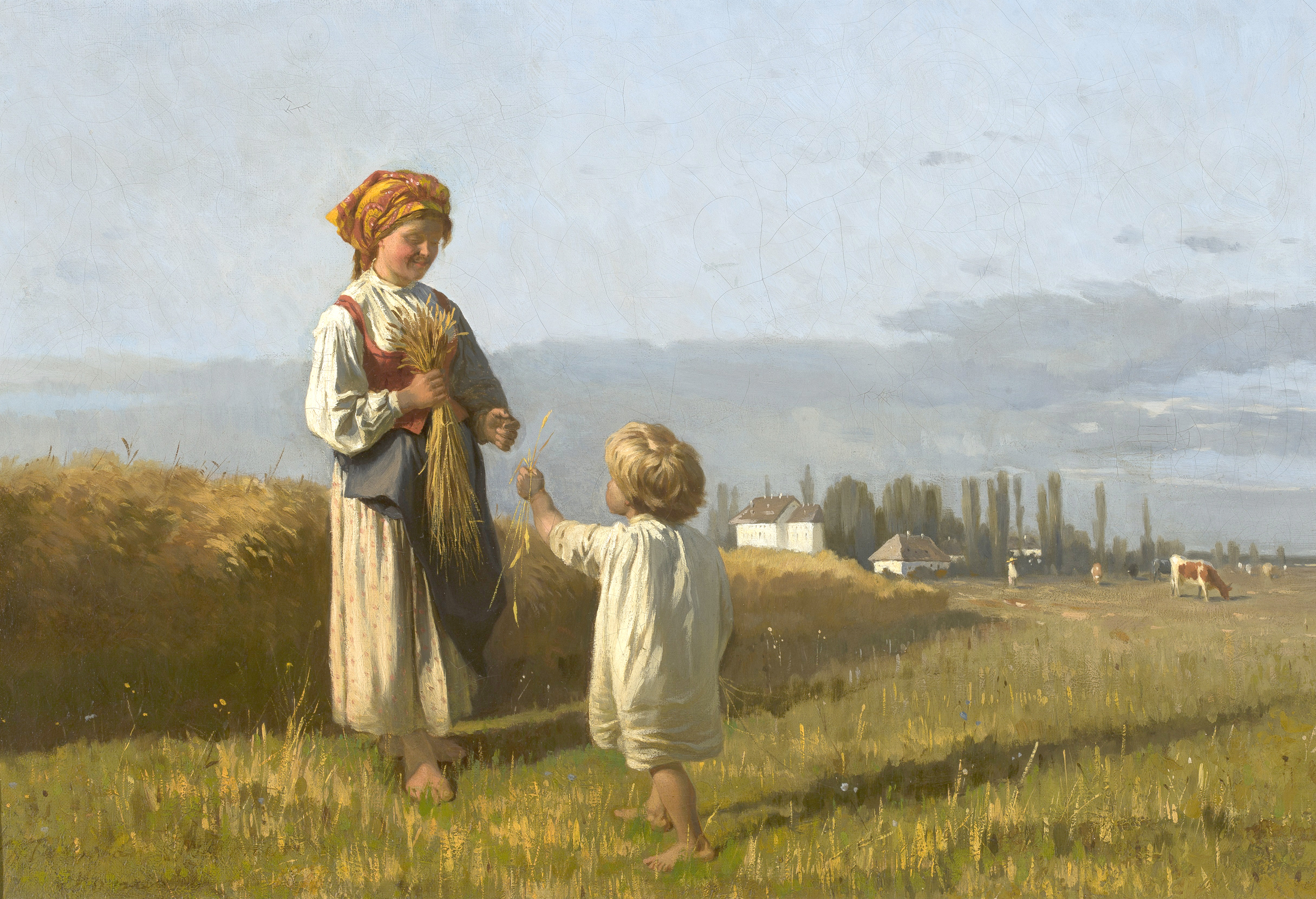
”After the Harvest”, ~1900, National Museum, Warsaw

Władysław Szerner (Warsaw, 3 June 1836 - Unterhaching, 4 January 1915) was a Polish painter.

He studied at the Academy of Fine Arts in Warsaw from 1862 and from 1865 at the Academy of Fine Arts in Munich.

After his studies, he stayed in Munich and worked mainly as a horse painter. With his friend Józef Brandt, he travelled through Volhynia and Ukraine.

He was a member of the Kunstverein München (1874-1909).

His son, Władysław Karol Szerner (1870—1936), was also a painter; he used to sign as Władysław Szerner Jr. and he often copied painting by his father.
