= Hilde Goldschmidt =

German painter (1897–1980)

- The Sphinx, 1948
- Born: 7 September 1897; Leipzig, Germany
- Died: 7 August 1980 (aged 82); Kitzbühel, Austria
- Education: Leipzig Academy; Dresden Academy of Fine Arts
- Known for: Expressionist painting

Hilde Goldschmidt (7 September 1897 – 7 August 1980) was a German expressionist painter and printmaker. Facing persecution under the Nazi regime, she sought refuge in Britain during World War II before establishing herself in Austria in the 1950s.

== Biography ==
Goldschmidt was born in Leipzig into a middle-class Jewish family who had several artistic connections. The family knew the writers Rainer Maria Rilke and Thomas Mann and also the painter Marianne von Werefkin and her partner Alexei Jawlensky. From 1914 to 1917, Goldschmidt studied book design at the Leipzig Academy under Hugo Steiner Prag and produced woodcuts and lithographs in an expressionist style. She also took private painting lessions with O R Bossert and dance lessions at the Leipzig Opera ballet school as well as writing poetry. In 1918 the Dresden Academy of Fine Arts began admitting women students for the first time and Goldschmidt studied painting there from 1920 to 1923 during which time she was taught by Oskar Kokoschka. Goldschmidt lived a somewhat cosmopolitan life after graduating from the Dresden Academy. Between 1923 and 1932 she spent part of each year in Paris and then spent the summer in the south of France before returning to Leipzig for the winter. She exhibited works in New York in 1923 and rented a studio in Montparnasse. Her first solo exhibition was held at the Gallery Caspari in Munich in 1932 but was closed down by the authorities. Facing increased discrimination and persecution under the Nazi regime in Germany, Goldschmidt and her mother moved to Kitzbühel in the Austrian Tyrol in 1933 and both became Austrian citizens in 1936. Following the Anschluss, the Nazi annexation of Austria in 1938, they moved to London in 1939.

Arriving in London in 1939, Goldschmidt and her mother set up a small business, the Golly Studio, making and selling gloves and mittens to give themselves an income. A short holiday in the Lake District led them to move north and settle on the Langdale Estate near Ambleside. There they found themselves among an artistic community that included several other refugees, most notably the artist Kurt Schwitters, who became a close friend and influence on her work. In the Lake District, Goldschmidt continued to run Golly Studios, gave evening classes in leatherwork and continued to paint. She painted expressionist landscapes in bright pastel colours and also portraits such as Awake and Dreaming, showing a woman deep in melancholic introspection. A self-portrait from this time, in which Goldschmidt depicts herself as a sphinx, albeit one set in an English landscape, is now in the Tate collection. In 1949, Goldschmidt had a solo show in Manchester and later that year, after her mother had died, returned to Kitzbühel.

In Austria, Goldschmidt attempted to run a guest house for a number of years but after taking classes with her old teacher Oskar Kokoschka in 1954, she decided to concentrate full-time on her art. Her paintings became bolder and more structured often with thick black lines surrounding bold blocks of colour. Trips to Venice in the 1960s and to Israel in 1968 led to sets of silk screen prints, including Israel: Man and Country. Trips to Malta and Gozo also provided inspiration. Goldschmidt had several solo exhibitions in both Austria and England, notably at Annely Juda Fine Art in 1969 and at the Abbot Hall Art Gallery in Kendal during 1973. That exhibition subsequently toured venues in the north of England. Examples of her work featured in the exhibition Condemned, Forgotten, Rediscovered. The Fate of Expressive Art in the 20th Century held at the Cultural and Historical Museum in Osnabrück in 2001 which concentrated on artists whose work was suppressed by the Nazi regime. A joint exhibition of works by Goldschmidt and Schwitters was held at the Abbot Hall Art Gallery in 2003 and both feature in Abbot Hall's 2019 exhibition Refuge: The Art of Belonging.
