= Clemens von Wedemeyer =

German video artist

Clemens von Wedemeyer (born 1974 in Göttingen, Germany) is a German video artist.

He studied fine arts at the Academy of Visual Arts Leipzig, with Astrid Klein. In 2004 von Wedemeyer produced, together with Maya Schweizer, a documentary movie: Metropolis, Report from China which was finished in 2006. In 2008, he was a resident at the University of California, Santa Barbara. He lives and works in Berlin and Leipzig, Germany.

== Awards ==
- 2002 VG Bildkunst Award for Experimental Film and Video–art, Munich Film Festival, Germany
- 2002 Marion Ermer Prize, Leipzig
- 2005 Kunstpreis der Böttcherstrasse in Bremen, Germany
- 2006 Kurzfilmtage Oberhausen
- 2008 Villa Romana prize

=== Memberships ===
- 2026 Member of the Academy of Arts, Berlin

== Exhibitions ==
- 2016 P.O.V., Neuer Berliner Kunstverein, Germany (solo)
- 2015 Muster, MCA Screen, Museum of Contemporary Art, Chicago, US (solo)
- 2014 Every Word You Say, Kunstverein Braunschweig, Germany (solo)
- 2013 MAXXI – National Museum of the 21st Century Arts, Rome (solo)
- 2013 Bergen Assembly, Norway
- 2012 documenta (13), Kassel, Germany
- 2011 Metropolis, Report from China, Frankfurter Kunstverein, Frankfurt am Main, Germany (solo)
- 2010 Sun Cinema, Mardin, Turkey (public art project)
- 2009 Curve Commission, Barbican Arts Centre, London
- 2007 Skulptur Projekte Münster, Germany
- 2006 PS1 MoMA, New York City (solo)
- 2005 1st Moscow Biennale, Russia
