= Joseph Fassbender =

German painter

- Born: April 14, 1903; Cologne
- Died: January 5, 1974 (aged 70); Cologne
- Known for: Painting, draughting
- Movement: Abstract
- Awards: Villa Romana prize (1929); Order of Merit of the Federal Republic of Germany (1964)

Joseph Fassbender (Faßbender) (14 April 1903 in Cologne – 5 January 1974 in Cologne) was a German painter and draughtsman.

== Life and art ==
During the 1920s Fassbender was trained in painting by Richard Seewald at the Kölner Werkschulen. Since 1928, he ran his own studio in Cologne. As an artist, he primarily produced abstract paintings.

During the Second World War he was obliged to work as a Wehrmacht cartographer.

Since 1946 he ran a studio at Bornheim near Bonn. In 1947 Fassbender founded at Schloss Alfter near Bornheim, together with Hann Trier, Hubert Berke and some other artists and men of letters, the "Donnerstagsgesellschaft" in order to revive, and promote, modern painting in the Rhineland.

In 1951 he organized an exhibition for his friend, Max Ernst. In 1955, 1959 and 1964, Fassbender participated at the documentas I-III in Kassel.

In 1958 the artist was appointed professor of painting and drawing at the Kunstakademie Düsseldorf, where he retired in 1968.

Fassbender also designed many placards and book jackets.

== Awards ==
- 1929 Villa Romana prize
- 1955 Großer Kunstpreis der Stadt Köln
- 1964 Order of Merit of the Federal Republic of Germany
- 1964 Prize for Graphic Art, Venice Biennale

== Works ==
- "Vihaminazhera" and untitled wall-paintings at the Beethovenhalle in Bonn
- "Coincidentia oppositorum" - wall-paintings in the entrance hall of the Gesamtschule Bonn-Bad Godesberg
- Tapestries for the Staatskanzlei Düsseldorf and the city hall of Cologne
- Design for the paving of the WDR building in Cologne

== See also ==
- List of German painters
