= Ralf Brück =

German photographer

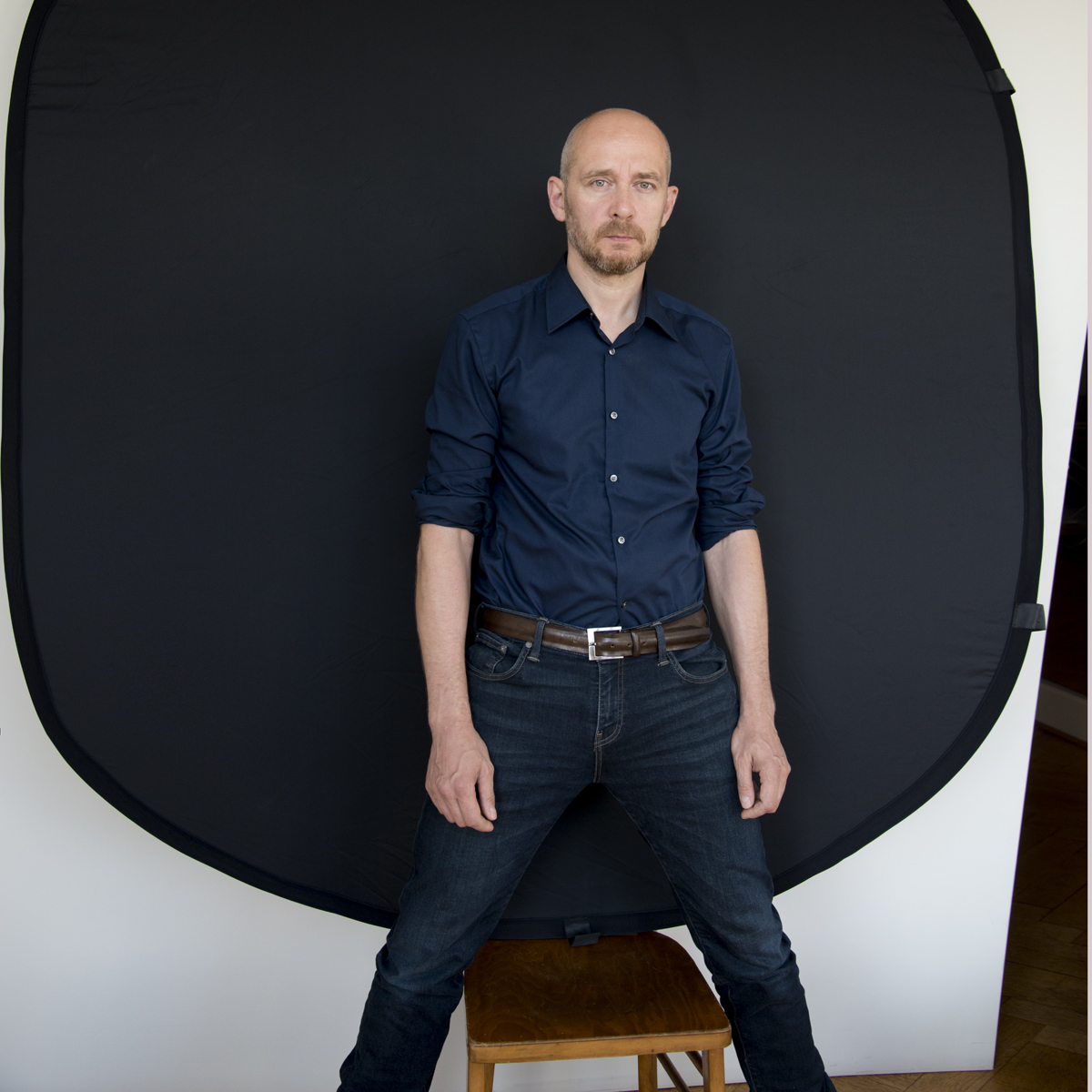
- Ralf Brueck
- Born: 1966 (age 59–60); Düsseldorf, West Germany
- Education: Kunstakademie Düsseldorf
- Known for: Photography
- Movement: Düsseldorf School of Photography

Ralf Brueck (born 1966 Düsseldorf) is a German artist.

Ralf Brueck is a younger exponent of the Düsseldorf School of Photography, which has achieved worldwide renown through Andreas Gursky, Candida Höfer, Thomas Struth and Thomas Ruff, whose master student he became in 2002. From 1996 to 2003, he studied at the Art Academy Düsseldorf.

Ralf Brueck was one of the last students of the Bernd and Hilla Becher class at the Kunstakademie Düsseldorf before he decided to become a student of Professor Thomas Ruff. After graduating from the Academy he received the Villa Romana Prize Fellowship in 2004 and lived in Florence, Italy, for 12 months. There followed several stays abroad in Europe, Asia and the USA between 2005 and 2011.

His large-format images are known for their radical editing. They also refer to pop cultural icons and are supported by their titles i.e. "Personal Jesus", "Pink Mist", "Transmission" and "You don´t look so good".

His earlier works were more influenced by the connection between the Düsseldorf School of Photography and the New American Photography. Since 2009 he has moved towards digital image manipulation. His series TRANSFORMER systematically questions the nature of photography and its representation of reality by isolating particular subjects and altering their proportions. It establishes a new dynamic dialogue between the images and the viewer since what is perceived runs counter to expectations.

2011 marks the beginning of the series DISTORTION which is characterized by a shift of pictorial structures. In DISTORTION Ralf Brueck extracts tonal elements from his works which are parts of the digital texture of the images and changes them by premeditated manipulation. The photographic representations therefore gain a new dimension by transforming the depicted reality.

The structures remind one of barcodes which so to speak expose the DNA of the images.

By this highly calculated use of barcode patterns Brueck contributes to an investigation into constructedness of images and the world itself.

Since 2012 his work has become more radical. His new series DECONSTRUCTION shows a drastic dissolution of images boundaries amounting to their complete destruction. Ralf Brueck manipulations of images are not geared towards pointing out that contemporary digital photography is deficient in its representation of reality but argues that a photograph constitutes its own reality.

== Awards ==
- 2001 Leo Award-Breuer, Rheinisches Landesmuseum Bonn
- 2002 Lovell's Arts Award
- 2003 NVV studio scholarship, Moenchengladbach
- 2004 Villa Romana prize
- 2005 NRW Arts Foundation
- 2005 Artist Exchange Program between Duesseldorf and Tampere, Finland
- 2008 Foundation Art Fund
- 2009 Transfer Project, Kulturbuero NRW, Germany
- 2010 Organhaus Art Space Residency together with Sichuan Fine Arts Institute, Chongqing, China
- 2010 Tapiola Studio Foundation residency, Espoo, Finland
- 2010 Thyll-Duerr-Foundation residency, Elba, Italy

== Selected exhibitions ==
- 2024 “viewing the world”, Museum Chemnitz, Chemnitz, Germany Kunstsammlungen-Chemnitz
- 2024 „Himmel und Höhle“, Schierke Seinecke, Frankfurt, Germany Galerie Schierke Seinecke
- 2024 “darktaxa-project: phtoograify”, photo+ Biennale for Visual and Sonic Media, Düsseldorf, Germany DARKTAXA
- 2023 „Umwandlung“, Schierke Seinecke, Frankfurt, Germany Galerie Rundgänger
- 2021 Future Conditionell, GESTE Paris, Paris, France
- 2021 Disappear, Kunst & Denker Contemporary, Duesseldorf, Germany Galerie Kunst & Denker
- 2020 Subjekt und Objekt, Kunsthalle Duesseldorf, Germany
- 2018 DECONSTRUCTION, Kunst & Denker Contemporary, Duesseldorf, Germany
- 2017 TZR Gallery Kai Brückner, Duesseldorf, Germany
- 2017 Princehouse Gallery, Mannheim, Germany
- 2016 "The typological view, Exhibition for Hilla Becher", Die Photographische Sammlung / SK Stiftung Kultur, Cologne, Germany
- 2016 NRW FORUM, Duesseldorf, Germany
- 2014 BLOG RE-BLOG Austin Center for Photography, Austin TX
- 2013 BLOG RE-BLOG Signal Gallery, New York NY
- 2013 Kunstmeile Wangen, Wangen, Germany
- 2012 Rethinking Reality, Kuckei + Kuckei, Berlin, Germany
- 2011 "DISTORTION THREE", so what gallery, Duesseldorf, Germany
- 2011 "DISTORTION TWO", Kunstverein Duisburg, Duisburg, Germany
- 2011 "DISTORTION", Gallery Muelhaupt, Cologne, Germany
- 2010 "2010 / 2010" Organhaus Sichuan Fine Arts Institute, Chongqing, China
- 2009 "ich liebe amerika und amerika liebt mich", Gallery Muelhaupt, Cologne, Germany
- 2009 "betonbar: ralf brueck", Mannheim, Germany
- 2009 "pain is weakness leaving the body", the bakery, Munich, Germany
- 2009 "w", Gallery aplanat, Hamburg, Germany
- 2009 "the good times are killing me", Gallery Pitrowski, Berlin, Germany
- 2008 "que onda guero", galerie januar ev., Bochum, Germany
- 2007 James Harris Gallery, Seattle, US
- 2006 "...im Ernst (being serious)", Rheinisches Landesmuseum Bonn, Germany
- 2006 "Finnlandfotos1" Goethe Institut Helsinki, Finland
- 2000 Kunstverein Arnsberg, Germany

== Works ==
- "Ralf Brueck", Heart Breaker Magazine
- Ralph Goertz (Hrsg.): Ralf Brueck. Deconstruction Distortion DAF Timecapsules. Wienand, Köln 2016, ISBN 978-3-86832-308-5.
