= Kunstverein München =

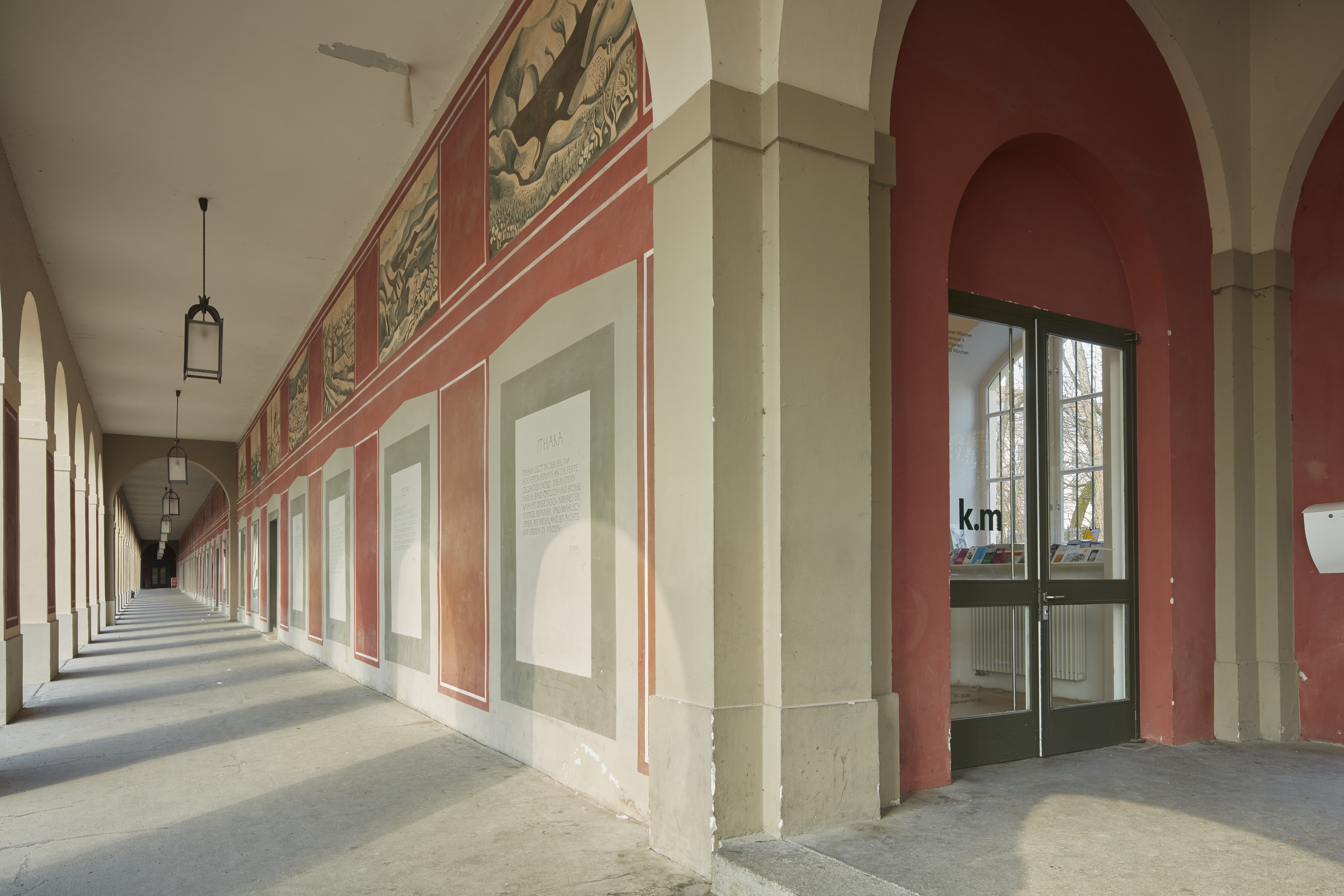
- View of Kunstverein München
- Formation: 1823
- Location: Galeriestrasse 4, 80539 Munich, Germany
- Coordinates: 48°8′37.56″N 11°34′49.07″E
- Website: www.kunstverein-muenchen.de/en

The Kunstverein München (km) is a non-profit art association located in the Hofgarten in Munich, Germany. It was founded in 1823 and is one of the oldest German art associations.

The Kunstverein, a privately sponsored association with almost 1,300 members, focuses on solo and group exhibitions by international artists. It belongs to the Arbeitsgemeinschaft Deutscher Kunstvereine (ADKV), an umbrella organization for non-profit art associations.

Since July 2019, Maurin Dietrich is the director of Kunstverein München. In October 2019, Gloria Hasnay joined the institution as curator.

== History ==
=== Directors (selection) ===
- 1978–1985: Wolfgang Jean Stock
- 1986–1991: Zdenek Felix
- 1992–1995: Helmut Draxler
- 1996–2001: Dirk Snauwaert
- 2002–2004: Maria Lind
- 2004–2009: Stefan Kalmár
- 2010–2015: Bart van der Heide
- 2015–2019: Chris Fitzpatrick
- since 2019: Maurin Dietrich

== Partial list of exhibitions ==
- 30 Jahre Kunst (2017), Jos de Gruyter and Harald Thys
- A rock that keeps tigers away (2017), nine artists including Simon Dybbroe Møller
- Serving Compressed Energy With Vacuum (2015), Anne-Mie van Kerckhoven
- Works by Ger van Elk (2014)
- Door Between Either And Or Part 1 (2013), twelve artists including Isa Genzken, Jeanne Mammen, Josephine Pryde, Carol Rama, and Amy Sillman
- 4 projects in Mexico (2013), various artists
- The Li vi ng (2013), Rebecca Warren
