= Gabriela Dauerer =

German painter (1958–2023)

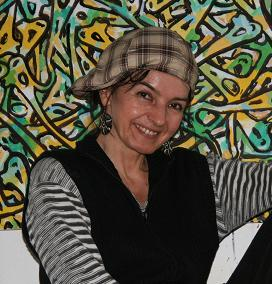
Gabriela Dauerer

Gabriela Dauerer (12 July 1958 – 22 January 2023) was a German painter. She was a representative of minimalistic painting.

== Life ==
From 1979 to 1986, Dauerer studied painting and graphic arts at the Akademie der Bildenden Künste Nürnberg (Academy of Fine Arts, Nuremberg) with Professors Ernst Weil and Christine Colditz. During this time, she won the Academy's award and a scholarship of the Deutsch-Französisches Jugendwerk (German-French Youth Promotion) for a stay of three years at Villa Arson in Nice (France).

From 1984 to 1986 she passed a diploma study in Nice at Ecole Pilote Internationale d'Art et de Recherche with Professor Ben Vautier, among others.

In 1986 Dauerer won the Bavarian Award of First Appearance for young littérateurs and visual artists. One year in Florence followed in 1988 in the course of Villa Romana Award.

In 1992 Dauerer spent one year in New York City and Tucson in the United States due to a scholarship of the Bavarian States Ministry of Science and Arts.

She represented Monaco together with Barbara Sillari at the 50th Venice Biennale, in 2003, with their project work Il sogno que risorge dalla vita (The Dream that Rises from Life).

== Awards ==
- 1988 Villa Romana prize
- 1989 Bayerischer Kulturförderpreis (Award of Cultural Promotion)
- 1991 Promotion award of Stadtwerke Mönchengladbach
- 2003 Wolfram-von-Eschenbach-Förderpreis (promotion award)
- 2004 2nd Arts Award of the Nürnberger Nachrichten

== See also ==
- List of German painters
