= Andrea Faciu =

Romanian artist

Andrea Faciu (born 1977 in Bucharest) is a Romanian artist who has lived in Germany since 1991.

She graduated from the Academy of Fine Arts, Munich, where she studied with Olaf Metzel. She lives in Munich, Germany and Berlin.

== Awards ==
- 2007 Villa Romana prize

== Exhibitions ==
- 2010 Renaissance Society of Chicago
- 2009 La Biennale di Venezia, the Romanian Pavilion
- 2009 OPEN e v+ a, Limerick
