= Sebastian Dacey =

German artist

Sebastian Dacey (born 1982 London) is an English/German artist.

He studied at the Wimbledon College of Art, and at the Akademie der Bildenden Künste in Munich.

He has exhibited at the Kunstverein Heilbronn and the Kunstbau Lenbachhaus in Munich, Jacky Strenz, Frankfurt,

He lives in Berlin.

== Awards ==
- 2010 Villa Romana prize
