= Dani Gal =

Israeli video artist (born 1975)

- דני גל
- Born: 1975 (age 50–51); Jerusalem, Israel
- Occupation: Filmmaker

Dani Gal (Hebrew: דני גל; born 1975 in Jerusalem) is an artist and a filmmaker who lives and works in Berlin, Germany.

== Biography ==
He studied at Bezalel Academy for Art and Design in Jerusalem, Staatliche Hochschule für Bildende Künste Städelschule in Frankfurt and in Cooper Union in New York. His films and installations have been shown at the 54th Venice Biennale (2011), Istanbul Biennale (2011), New Museum New York (2012), Kunsthalle St. Gallen Switzerland (2013), The Jewish Museum New York (2014), Berlinale Forum Expanded (2014), Kunsthaus Zurich (2015) Kunsthalle Wien (2015), Documenta 14 (2017), Centre Pompidou (2018), Club TransMediale Festival Berlin, Festival Steirischer Herbst, Graz (2020). In 2019 he was artist-in-residence with Blood Mountain Projects and research fellows at the Vienna Wiesenthal Institute.

== Selected exhibitions ==
- 2020 – Steirischer Herbst (Paranoia TV) Graz
- 2019 – Weissenhof City, Staatsgallerie Stuttgart
- 2018 – FRONT International, Cleveland, OH, Screening at Centere Pompidou, Paris
- 2017 – Documenta 14
- 2016 – Collection on Display: Momentary Monuments, Migros Museum für Gegenwartskunst, Zurich,
- 2015 – Europa, Die Zukunft der Geschichte, Kunsthaus Zürich
- 2014 – The Jewish Museum, New York, Kunstraum Innsbruck, Forum expanded – 66th Berlinale, Berlin
- 2013 – Kunsthalle St. Gallen, Turku Art Museum, FIN, Screening at 2013 – ICA, London
- 2012 – Stowaways Series, New Museum, New York, Wattis Institute for Contemporary Arts, San Francisco, USA,
- 2011 – ILLUMInazioni, 54. Biennale di Venezia, Untitled, 12. Istanbul Biennial

== Publications ==
- Gal, Dani (2009). Chanting Down Babylon (in German). ISBN 978-3-941560-23-9.
- Gal, Dani (2018). Historical Records. Snoeck. ISBN 978-3-86442-214-0.
- Gal, Dani; Ebbensen, Mika Hayashi (2021). An Elaborate Gesture of Pastness. ISBN 978-2-940672-21-9.
- Gal, Dani (3 September 2020). "edcat – i.e. Edition No. 43". edcat – artists’ publication catalogue.

== Awards and residencies ==
- 2020 – Radio Lab CTM
- 2019 – Residency at Blood Mountain Projects Vienna, Fellowship at the Vienna Wiesenthal Institute for Holocaust Studies. Vienna, AT
- 2012 – Hans Purmann Prize
- 2009 – Ars Viva Award
- 2008 – Villa Romana Prize, Florence, IT
