= Kadist =

International art organization

Coordinates: 37°45′31.7″N 122°24′52″W

Kadist Paris
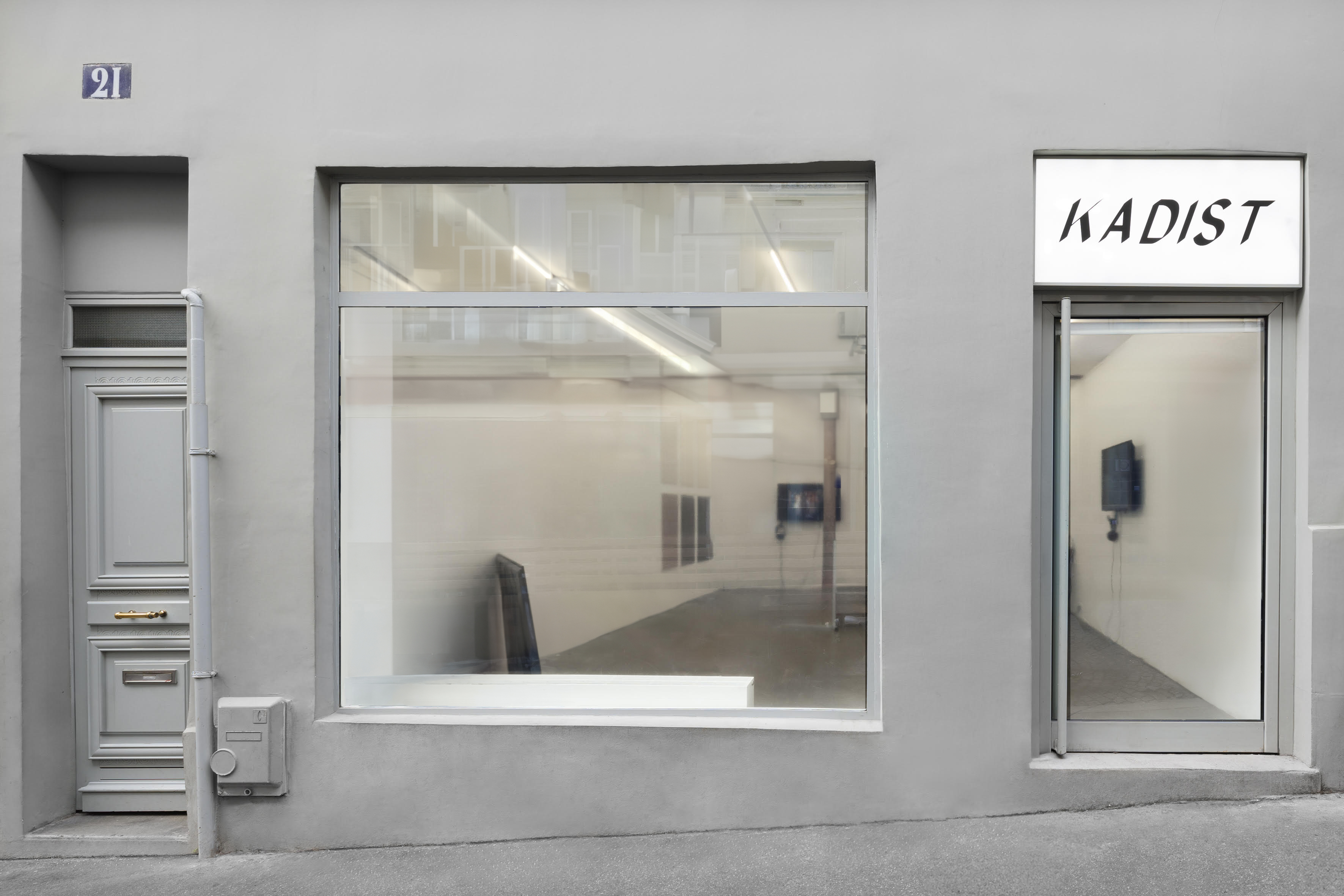
- KADIST Paris, 2024 © Vinciane Lebrun/Voyez-Vous
- Interactive map of Kadist Paris
- Address: 19bis/21 rue des Trois Frères; Paris, France
- Capacity: 100 (est.)
- Type: Gallery, Art Center

Construction
- Opened: 2006

Kadist San Francisco
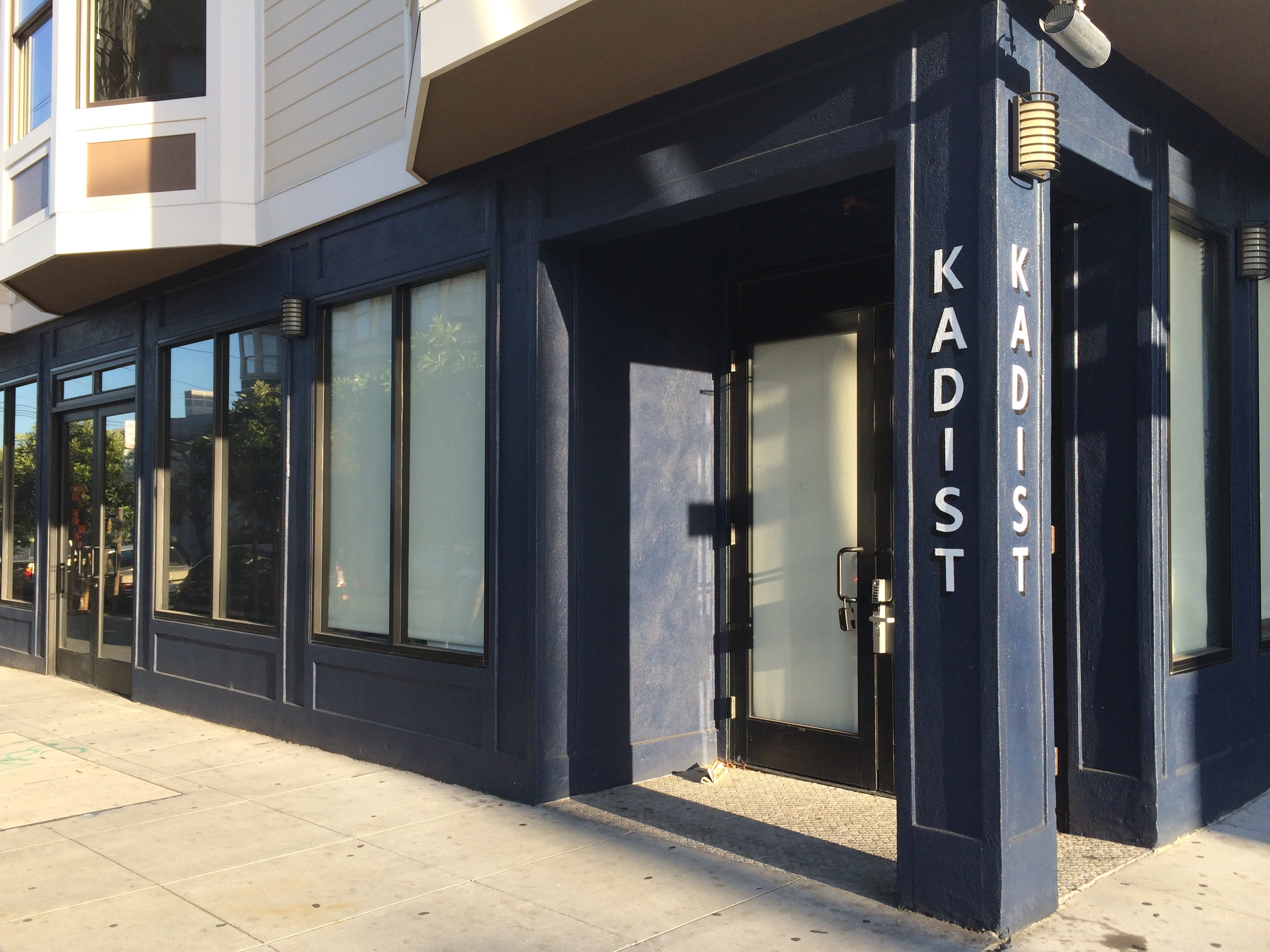
- Interactive map of Kadist San Francisco
- Address: 3295 20th Street; San Francisco, United States
- Capacity: 100 (est.)
- Type: Gallery, art center

Construction
- Opened: 2011

KADIST is an interdisciplinary contemporary arts organization with an international contemporary art collection. KADIST hosts artist residencies and produces exhibitions, publications, and public events. Founded by Vincent Worms and Sandra Terdjman, the first location was opened in Paris in 2006. A San Francisco, California location was opened in the Mission District in 2011.

== Programs ==
KADIST's "Double Takes" is a program that exhibits film and video works through public screenings and exhibitions and shared on their online platform. Myth in Motion is an example of a Double Takes program in Phnom Penh, Cambodia. The 2023 exhibit presented the works of five female artists. Other recent examples include Teacher Don't Teach Me Nonsense at the Fondation H, Madagascar.

KADIST hosts exhibitions by artists and curators, often in coordination with their residency program. Exhibitions are located at their Paris and San Francisco galleries. KADIST organizes curatorial collaborations with art spaces internationally, such as the 2024 Feet Under Fire: On Dispossession exhibition at the Museum of Contemporary Art Panama. or Borders are Nocturnal Animals with the Palais de Tokyo, in Paris.

Artists they have worked with include Ryan Gander, Danh Vo, Hank Willis Thomas and Roman Ondàk. They have co-produced large scale artist projects, including "Klau Mich" by Dora García, "Muster" by Clemens von Wedemeyer at Documenta (13), or "Behemoth II" by Michael Rakowitz.

KADIST provides residencies for new artistic productions, publications, writers and curators. Residents include: Jota Mombaça, Xaviera Simmons, Rosella Biscotti, Young-Hae Chang Heavy Industries, bookstore Ooga Booga and publications like White Fungus, Nero, and Fillip, or de montanas submarinas el fuego hace islas.

KADIST hosts an ongoing series of events in San Francisco and Paris, which have involved screenings, performances, conversations and live music.

== Collection ==
The KADIST collection was established in 2001 and includes film and video, performance, painting, photography, drawings and prints, sculpture, and installations. The collection focuses on five regions: the Middle East & Africa, Asia, North America, Latin America and Europe. KADIST has also commissioned artworks through its exhibition program and in collaboration with international biennials—some of which are part of the collection.

In 2023, KADIST inaugurated the "Nomadic Collection", making part of its collection available to international museums. This series was inaugurated with the Centre Pompidou in 2023 and the Pinacoteca de São Paulo in 2025.
