= Shannon Bool =

Canadian artist

Shannon Bool (born 1972) is a Canadian artist. Bool lives and works in Berlin.

== Education ==
Bool was born in 1972 in Comox, British Columbia. She received a Master's degree from the Städelschule, Frankfurt.

== Career ==
In 2005, her work was featured in Phaidon's inaugural tome on "New Perspectives in Drawing" Vitamin D. Compiled in its pages were a number of productions by the artist that hinted at a diverse approach to drawing through a combination of processes and materials including cut paper, graphite and ink collaged and taped together; a wallpaper collage with pencil, crayon and oil paint; a pencil and gouache wall work combined with a laminate sculpture; drawings on regular paper, antique paper acrylics and Chinese inks. The entry on Bool in the Vitamin D catalogue remarked: "Her works borrow and reproduce eclectic source material, including ornamental designs and patterns, textile and wallpaper samples, found postcards and photographs, advertising images from the 1920s and 30s, illustrations from fairy-tale books, and details from art-historical paintings.

In 2013, Bool was awarded the Villa Romana Prize. In 2019, she was shortlisted for the Scotiabank Photography Award.

== Solo exhibitions ==
- 2019: Canadian Cultural Centre, Paris.
- 2019: Kunstverein Braunschweig
- 2018: Musée d'art de Joliette, Joliette, Quebec.
- 2018: Daniel Faria Gallery, Toronto.
- 2014: Pavillon social Kunstverein, Lucca, Italy.
- 2013: Galerie Kadel Willborn, Dusseldorf, Germany.
- 2012: Galerie Kadel Willborn, Karlsruhe, Germany.
- 2011: Gesellschaft für Aktuelle Kunst, Bremen, Germany.
- 2001: Bonner Kunstverein, Berlin.

== Collections ==
Her work is included in the collections of the National Gallery of Canada, the Metropolitan Museum of Art and the Musée d'art contemporain de Montréal.
