= Anna Möller =

German artist

Anna Möller (born 1980 in Hamburg) is a German artist.

She studied at the Hochschule für bildende Künste Hamburg.

From 2004 to 2008, she ran the exhibition space Pudelkollektion (Poodle Collection) in the Golden Pudel Club in Hamburg, with Hannes Loichinger and Tillmann Terbuyken.

She lives and works in Hamburg and Berlin.

== Awards ==
- 2010 Villa Romana prize

== Publications ==
- "Learn Another Language", The Generational: Younger Than Jesus, New Museum / Phaidon 2009 (Contribution) 2009
- Anna Möller, "Object", hide, Textem Verlag 2008, Ed. 600
- Anna Möller, "Untitled" (deutsches Eck), Offset without Cover, Ed. 600 2006
- "Gut aufgehoben", (Editor & Contribution), materialverlag 2005, Ed. 250
- Anna Möller, "Lost Images", Contribution to the DVD The Night Will Last Forever, Mute 2005
