= Asli Sungu =

German performance artist, and painter (born 1975)

Asli Sungu (born 1975 Istanbul) is a German performance artist, and painter.

She lives and works in Berlin.

== Awards ==
- 2010 The Delfina Foundation London residency
- 2007 Villa Romana prize
- 2007 blauorange award, shortlist

== Works ==
- "Ganz die Mutter" (2006), Video, 12 min.
- "Ganz der Vater" (2006), Video, 14 min.

== Exhibitions ==
- 2008 Deutsche Guggenheim, Berlin
- 2008 The Khyber, Halifax
- 2008 Goethe-Institut, Montreal
- 2006 Goethe-Institut, Ankara
