= Anna Heidenhain =

German artist

Anna Heidenhain (born 1979 Wiesbaden) is a German artist.

She studied at the Kunstakademie Düsseldorf. Since 2006, she worked with Elmar Hermann and Maki Umehara on "nüans" projects, and since 2016, with Hugo Holger Schneider and Elmar Hermann. Her work has shifted from sculpture towards social space. In 2006, she received an artist's grant to work at the Goyang National Art Studio, in Korea.

She has been living and working in Istanbul since 2007. She organized with Kristina Kramer Manzara Perspectives until 11/2009 in Galata, Istanbul.

== Awards ==
- 2010 Villa Romana prize
