= Lerato Shadi =

South African visual artist (born 1979)

- Born: Lerato Mmathapelo Thato Shadi; 1979 (age 46–47); Mahikeng, South Africa
- Education: University of Johannesburg; Weißensee Academy of Art Berlin (MA)
- Occupation: Contemporary visual artist
- Years active: 2007 – present
- Known for: Performance art, text-based art installation
- Notable work: Mosako wa Nako (loosely translates to a 'River of Time,' performance art)
- Awards: UJ Alumni Dignitas Award (2016), Villa Romana Prize (2018)
- Website: leratoshadi.art

Lerato Mmathapelo Thato Shadi (born 1979) is a South African-born visual artist, known for performance art and installation art. Her practice centres on the body in space, often using her own body to examine how knowledge systems and social structures shape identity and belonging. Working across performance, installation, video, drawing, and text, she uses time, labour, language, land, and the body as both material and subject. Her work often employs repetitive, process-based methods—including weaving, crochet and knitting, text, and moving image—to explore relationships between bodies and land, engaging themes such as land dispossession, institutional power, historical erasure, ancestry, and self-determination. She lives in Berlin.

== Early life and education ==
Lerato Shadi was born in 1979, in Mahikeng, South Africa. Shadi studied visual art at the University of Johannesburg, and earned a MA degree in 2018 in spatial strategies from Weißensee Academy of Art Berlin.

== Career ==
Her work has been shown internationally in various exhibitions, including Sesc Pompeia, São Paulo (2025); Zeitz MOCAA (2025–2026) and the Norval Foundation, Cape Town (2024–2025); Bundeskunsthalle, Bonn (2023–2024); Bienalsur, Buenos Aires (2023); and Kunstmuseum Wolfsburg (2022). Further presentations included the Palais de la Porte Dorée and the Musée d’Art Moderne, Paris (2021); the 14th Curitiba Biennial, Brazil (2019); and solo shows at blank projects (2023, 2025), KINDL – Centre for Contemporary Art, Berlin, and the Kunstverein in Hamburg (2020). Shadi’s video work, Mabogo Dinku, was part of the 2020 Artists’ Film International programme organized by Whitechapel Gallery, London, and screened at art institutions globally. During the 2025 Black Berlin Black – Festivity, Shadi premiered her first holistic performance project at Ballhaus Naunynstraße, Berlin. In 2022, her monograph was published by Archive Books (Berlin-Dakar-Milano).

== Style ==
Shadi’s work has been described as a critique of Western historiography, with an emphasis on centring marginalised bodies within narrative structures rather than treating them as peripheral. By placing herself at the forefront of her work, she addresses cultural erasure and structural exclusion, and examines how meaning is produced and maintained. A recurring concern is the labour of historical memory—who is expected to remember, explain, or be understood, and who is permitted to forget. This approach frames the interrogation of history as an ethical demand on both the artist and the audience. Shadi posits that the passive acceptance of inaccurate histories constitutes a form of complicity, asserting that the insistence on more comprehensive narratives is a necessary act.

== Awards ==
She received the UJ Alumni Dignitas Award of the University of Johannesburg in 2016, and was awarded with the AFRICA’SOUT! residency program (New York) in 2017. She was a recipient of the 2018 Villa Romana Prize, Florence, Italy.
