= Andrea Hanak =

German painter

Andrea Hanak (born 1969 Wolfratshausen) is a German painter.

In 2000, she studied at the Erasmus programme, Ireland. In 2005, she graduated from Academy of Fine Arts Munich, where she studied with Günther Förg. She lives and works in Munich.

== Awards ==
- 2006 Villa Romana prize
- 2011/12 Förderprogramm zur Chacengleichheit für Frauen in Forschung und Lehre

== Exhibitions ==
- 2010 "Komm wir gehen", Galerie Matthias Jahn, Munich
- 2009 "Apokalypse mit Figuren", Andreas Grimm Galerie, Munich
- 2009 "Der Beweis", Vortrag von Berthold Reiß, Weltraum, Munich
- 2007 "Auch das Unnatürliche ist die Natur", Galerie Michael Neff, Frankfurt
- 2006 Greenberg Van Doren Gallery, New York
- 2006 Sies + Höke Galerie, Düsseldorf
- 2005 "Favoriten“, Kunstbau/Lenbachhaus, Munich; 17. Federal Competition, Art and Exhibition Hall of the Federal Republic of Germany, Bonn
- 2002/03 "Undine renoviert!“, Galerie Royal, Munich
- 2001 "Märchenwald“, Akademie Galerie, Munich
