= Barbara Kussinger =

German artist

- Born: 1970 (age 55–56); Freising, Upper Bavaria, Germany
- Education: Academy of Fine Arts Munich

Barbara Kussinger (born 1970 in Freising, Upper Bavaria) is a German artist.

In 1999, she studied at Sommerakademie in Salzburg, Austria. In 2006, she graduated from Academy of Fine Arts Munich.

== Awards ==
- 2007 Villa Romana prize

== Solo Shows ==
- 2008 Galerie Royal, Munich.
- 2005 "Evergreen", Bundesgartenschau München
- 2004 "Zimmer frei", Hotel Mariandl, München
- 2002 "Just Friends", Klassen Förg und Willikens, Domagkateliers München
- 2001 Messe "Characters", MOC München
