= Ulrich Hübner =

German artist

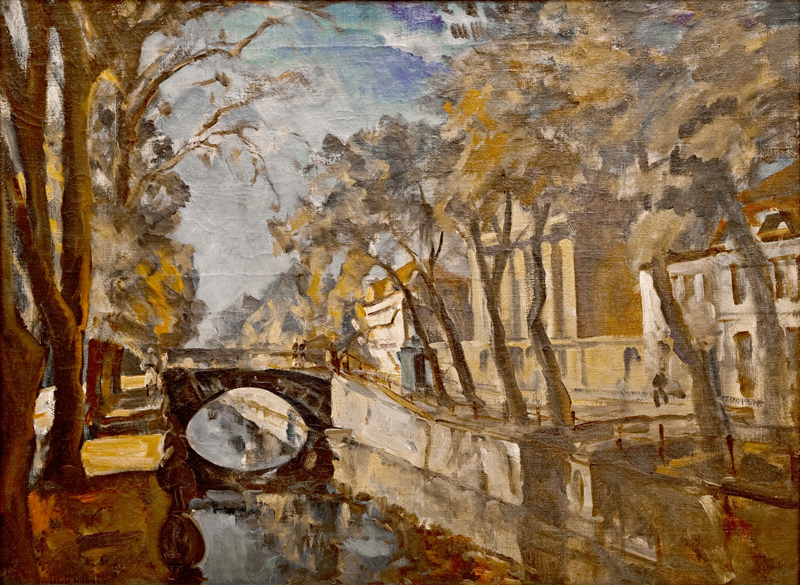
City Canal, Potsdam

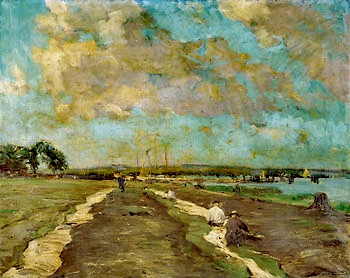
Net Maker in Travemünde, 1905

Ulrich Hübner (17 June 1872, Berlin - 29 April 1932, Neubabelsberg) was a German painter.

== Biography ==
He was born into a family of artists and began his academic training 1892 in Karlsruhe with Robert Poetzelberger, Gustav Schönleber, and Carlos Grethe. He then studied at the private art school in Munich operated by Friedrich Fehr. In 1899, he was a member of the Berlin Secession, and in 1906 and 1907 was on the advisory board.

That same year, he won the prize for advertising designs presented by Ludwig and Otto Stollwerck of the Stollwerck chocolate company.

He painted in Berlin, Havel, and (in the summers), Hamburg, Lübeck, Rostock and Travemünde (where he had his principal residence from 1909 to 1912). While there, he specialized in harbor and other maritime scenes.

He held exhibitions with the Kunstverein in the Kunsthalle Hamburg in 1910. Some of his works are in the Behnhaus museum, in Lübeck, and the Los Angeles County Museum of Art. His work was also part of the painting event in the art competition at the 1932 Summer Olympics.

== Awards ==
- 1905 Villa Romana prize
