= Klaus Fußmann =

German painter

Klaus Fußmann (born 24 March 1938), is a contemporary German painter.

Fußmann was born in Velbert, Germany. He studied from 1957 to 1961 at the Folkwang University of the Arts in Essen and from 1962 to 1966 at the Berlin University of the Arts. From 1974 to 2005, he was a professor at the Berlin University of the Arts. Fußmann now divides his time living and working between Berlin and Gelting on the Baltic Sea.

His work has won several awards, such as the Villa Romana prize in 1972 and the Art Award of Darmstadt in 1979. Major presentations of his work include exhibitions at the Neue Nationalgalerie in Berlin, 1972; the Mathildenhöhe in Darmstadt, 1982; the Kunsthalle Emden, 1988; the Kunsthalle Bremen, 1992; and the Museum Ostwall in Dortmund, 2003. For his seventieth birthday in 2008 comprehensive exhibitions were held at Gottorf Castle in Schleswig, in the Free Academy of Arts in Hamburg, and at the Mannheim Arts League.

In 2005 Fußmann completed a monumental ceiling painting in the Mirror Hall of the Museum für Kunst und Gewerbe Hamburg.

== See also ==
- List of German painters
