= Constantin Wallhäuser =

German artist

Constantin Wallhäuser (born 1975 Siegen) is a German artist.

In 1992–1993, he studied at the Liverpool College of Art. In 1997–2004, he studied at Kunstakademie Düsseldorf.

He lives and works in Berlin.

== Awards ==
- 1997 Tobias Hantmann Prize
- 2005 Villa Romana prize

== Exhibitions ==
2008

- 23.08.08–24.08.08 Constantin Wallhäuser, Florian Neufeldt, Tina Beifuss, Lorenzo Pompa MAXIM Köln
- 23.08.08–24.08.08 "Don't call us – we call you" MAXIM Köln

2005

- 10.09.05–06.11.05 "Compilation II", Kunsthalle Düsseldorf
- 01.2005–04.2005 "Each Day Is Valentines Day", Jablonka-Lühn, Cologne

2004

- "Villa Romana-Preisträger", Von der Heydt Museum, Wuppertal
- 10.12.04–23.01.05 „Alice im Aggressorland“, with Elke Nebel, Kunstraum Düsseldorf
- 09.2004–10.2004 Constantin Wallhäuser Jablonka Galerie, Köln

2003

- "For Believe I Can Fly", Galerie Vera Gliem, Cologne
- "1st show", Galerie Eric Mathijsen, Amstelveen/Netherlands
- "Ihr Kinderlein kommet", Galerie Martin Bochynek, Düsseldorf
- "2nd show", Galerie Eric Mathijsen, Amstelveen/Netherlands
- 01.10.03–05.10.03 Art Forum Berlin 2003 Art Forum Berlin

2002

- Kunstverein Düsseldorf, Bar with Max Schulze
- Hotel Ufer, Düsseldorf
- "ww.werwoelfe.d.teilVI – neue werung", Kunst und Kulturstiftung
- Stadtsparkasse Düsseldorf

2001

- "Raum114", Kunstakademie Düsseldorf
- "Eine Hand voll Scheiße", Herold Klasse, John Doe, Düsseldorf
- "Sly präsentiert", Plusfiliale, Düsseldorf
