= Martin Pfeifle =

German sculptor (born 1975)

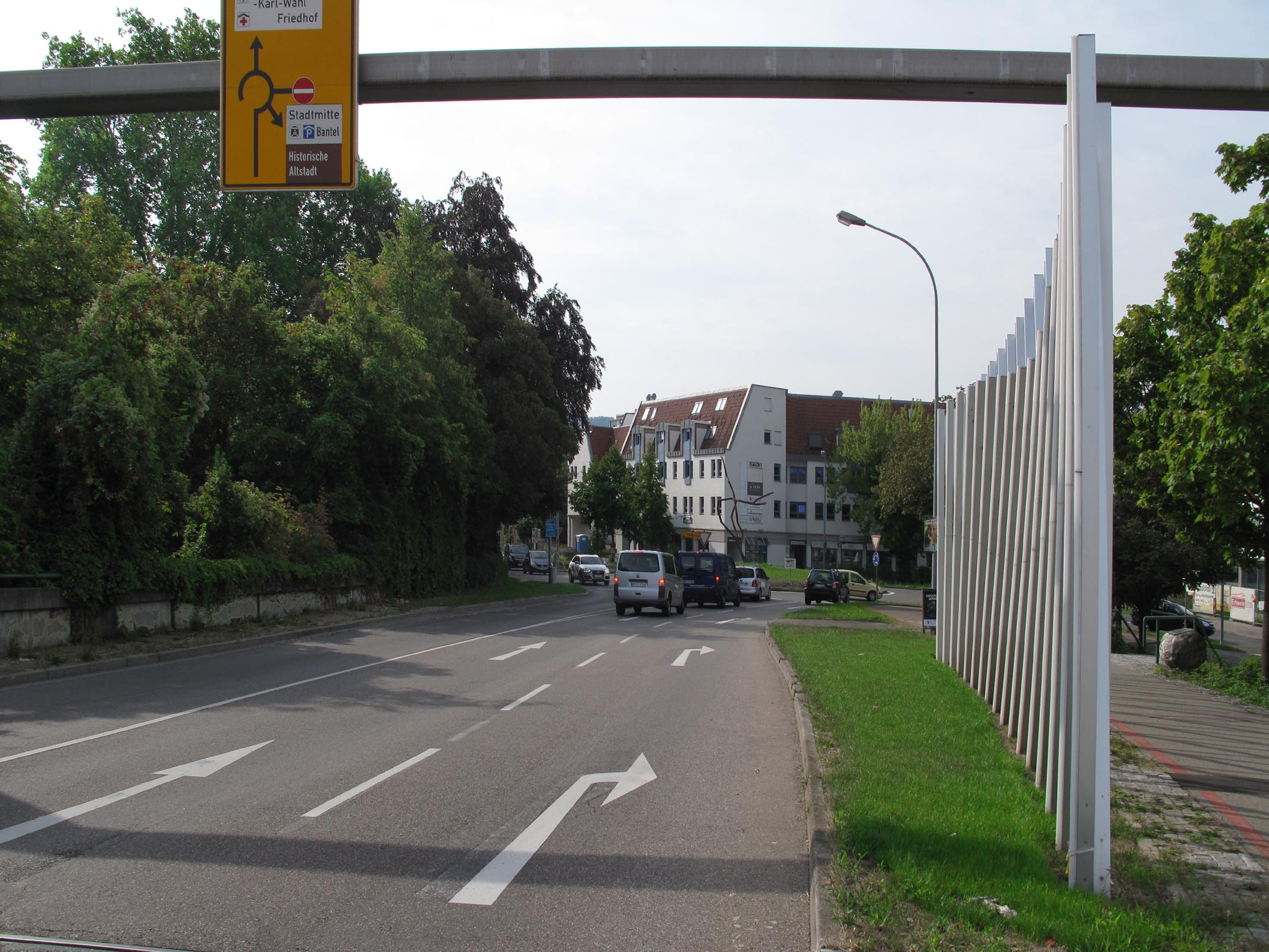
Limboo by Pfeifle in Schondorf (2012)

Martin Pfeifle (born 1975 in Stuttgart) is a German sculptor.

He graduated from the Kunstakademie Düsseldorf in 2004 with a master's degree where he studied with Hubert Kiecol.

He has already created numerous installations in interior and exterior space, including at the Westfälisches Landesmuseum in Münster, the Neuer Kunstverein in Aachen, the Lehmbruck Museum in Duisburg, Ringel/Garage, Düsseldorf, and Villa Romana, Florenz. He was Artist in Residence at Goethe-Institut Vietnam.

== Awards ==
- 2004 Wilhelm Lehmbruck grant
- 2010 Villa Romana Prize
