= Anna Kerstin Otto =

German painter (born 1972)

- Born: 1972 (age 53–54); Frankfurt am Main, West Germany
- Education: Hochschule für Gestaltung Offenbach, Academy of Reykjavík, Städelschule Frankfurt am Main
- Known for: Painting
- Awards: Villa Romana prize (2006)

Anna Kerstin Otto (born 1972 in Frankfurt am Main) is a German painter.

== Biography ==
In 1997–1999, Otto studied at Hochschule für Gestaltung, Offenbach, and Academy of Reykjavík, Iceland. In 1999–2005, she studied at Städelschule, at Frankfurt am Main, where she studied with Ayse Erkmen and Michael Krebber.

Otto has exhibited at the Jacky Strenz Gallery. She participated in Open Studios. In 2006 Otto won the Villa Romana prize.
