= Benjamin Yavuzsoy =

German artist

Benjamin Yavuzsoy (born 4 November 1980 Bremen) is a German artist.

He studied at Hochschule für bildende Künste Hamburg from 2001 to 2007. In 2023 he was a visiting lecturer at the Institute for Experimental Fashion- and Textiledesign at Universität der Künste Berlin. He lives and works in Berlin.

== Awards ==
- 2009 Villa Romana prize
