= Olivier Foulon =

Belgian artist (born 1976)

Olivier Foulon (born 1976 Brussels) is a Belgian artist.

From 1991 to 1995, he studied at the Institut Saint-Luc, Brussels; from 1995 to 1999, he studied at the Ecole de Recherche Graphique, Brussels; from 2001 to 2002, he studied at the Jan van Eyck Academie. In 2005–2006, he was artist in residence, Projekt-Just, Düsseldorf.

== Awards ==
- 2009 Villa Romana prize
- 2005 Prix de la Jeune Peinture Belge – Crowet, Palais des Beaux-Arts, Brussels

== Solo shows ==
- 2008 "Par delà le B. et le M. aussi", Musée Wellington, Waterloo (BE); "The Soliloquy of the Broom", Kölnischer Kunstverein, Cologne
- 2007 "Sprung in die Neuzeit – un seul ou plusieurs loups?", Galerie dépendance, Brussels; "redites et ratures" (Projekt für ein Schloss), Museum x, Museum Abteiberg, Mönchengladbach
- 2006 "redites et ratures" (alter Wein, neue Flaschen), Galerie Nadja Vilenne, Liège (BE); "redites et ratures", Projekt-Just, Düsseldorf
- 2004 "il Pleut, il Neige, il Peint", EAC (les halles), Porrentruy (CH); "Blind Man's Buff", Marres Center for Contemporary Art, Maastricht (NL); "Singe et Crocodile", Het Kabinet, Gent; "2. Un livre, un livre, des livres, des objets et des photos", Etablissement d'en face projects, Brussels
- 2003 "1. Des dessins de notes et caricatures", Etablissement d'en face projects, Brussels
- 2002 "En coulisses, parfois, les artistes changent de costumes" Actualités, Jan van Eyck Academie, Maastricht
