= Ulla Irina Rossek =

German artist

Ulla Rossek (born 1978) is a German artist.

In 1999–2003, she studied at Academy of Fine Arts, Munich. In 2003–2004, she studied at Städelschule Frankfurt. She lives and works in Berlin.

== Awards ==
- 2005 Villa Romana prize

== Exhibitions ==
2019

- 30.11.19–20.12.19 Ulla Rossek, Fox, Vienna

2017

- 09.09.17-20.10.17 Anita Leisz, Ulla Rossek, Halle für Kunst, Lüneburg

2009

- 01.05.09–30.05.09 Laure Prouvost / Ulla Rossek "after the butcher", Berlin

2008

- 26.04.07–26.05.07 Tension; Sex; Despair Kunsthalle Exnergasse, Wien

2006

- 07.05.06–09.05.06 Ulla Rossek / Freitagskueche General Public, Berlin

2005

- 05.03.05–01.05.05 "Wer von diesen sieben ...", Studiogalerie Kunstverein Braunschweig

2004

- "Villa Romana-Preisträger", Von der Heydt Museum Wuppertal
- "Adolph, Bohl, Breuer, Kleefeld, Rossek, Stahl", Kjubh-Raum, Cologne
- 05.06.04–03.07.04 "The Savoy", Collective Gallery, Edinburgh
- Opening of the Rossek/Stahl Exhibition Gallery together with Lucie Stahl

2003

- "The state of the upper floor: panorama"
- Exhibition project by Michael Beutler, Kunstverein Munich
