= Otto Richard Bossert =

German painter

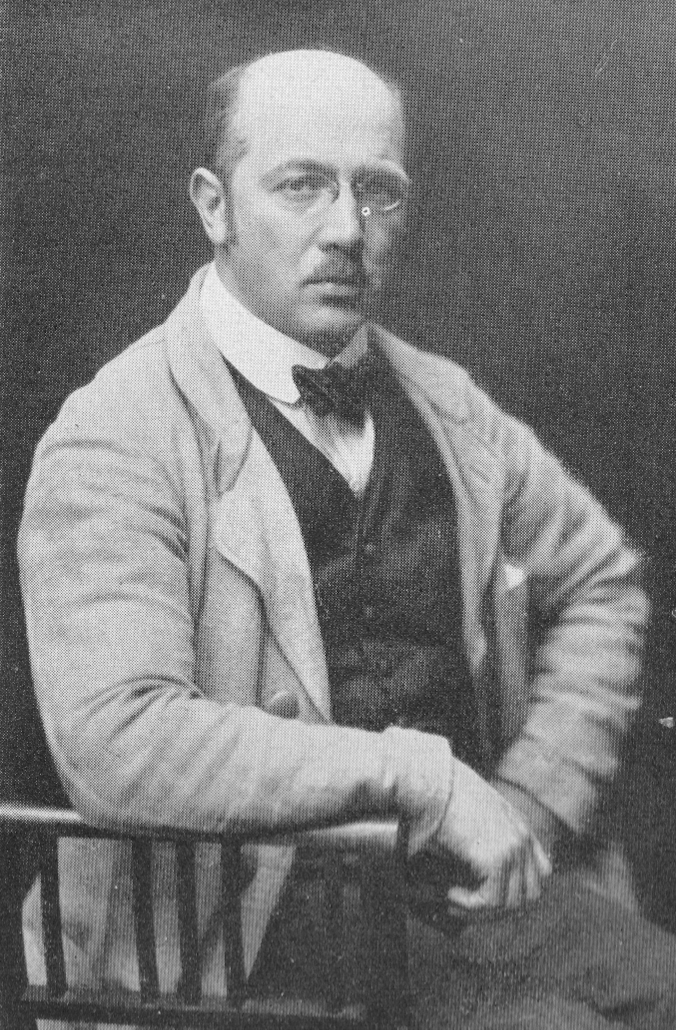
- Born: 1874; Heidelberg
- Died: 1919 (aged 44–45)

Otto Richard Bossert (1874–1919), also known as O. R. Bossert, was a German portrait painter, art teacher and graphic artist. Among his works are portrait etchings of historical figures and color woodcuts. His early works were influenced by Max Klinger. Bossert was born in Heidelberg and studied in Karlsruhe, before settling in Leipzig. In 1904 he began teaching at the Leipzig Academy for the Graphic Arts. In 1911 he spent a summer in Normandy and Brittany, where he was introduced to the art of Paul Cézanne. Bossert was a winner of 1914 Villa Romana prize. He died in 1919 in Leipzig.

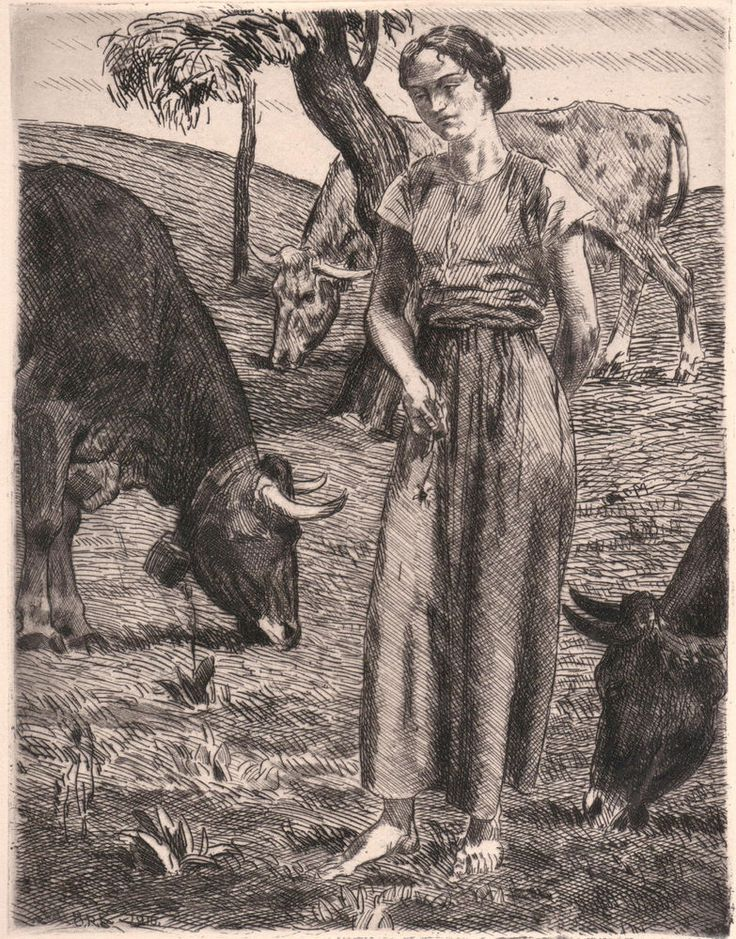
Die Hirtin (The Shepherdess), etching, 1916

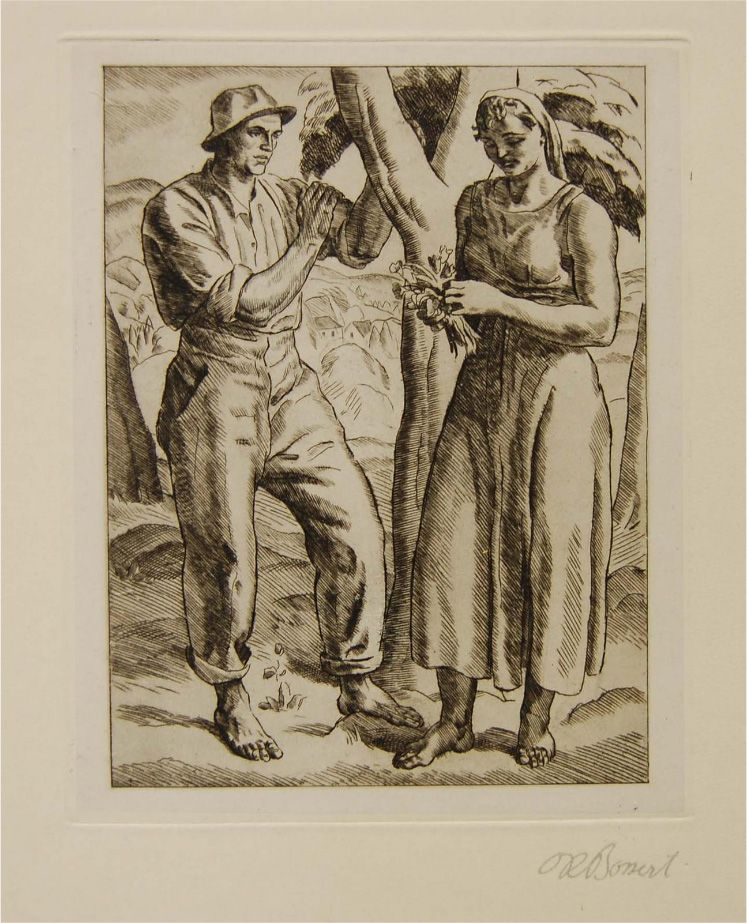
Land (1919)

== See also ==
- List of German painters
