= Kalin Lindena =

German artist

Kalin Lindena (born 1977 Hanover) is a German artist.

She graduated from the Hochschule für Bildende Künste Braunschweig in 2004, where she studied with Walter Dahn.

She showed at Simultanhalle, Cologne, DéPENDANCE, Brussels, and Stirling, UK. She lives in Berlin.

Since 2014, Lindena has been professor for painting at the Staatliche Akademie der Bildenden Künste Karlsruhe

== Awards ==
- 2009 Villa Romana prize

== Solo shows ==
- 2009 Names Bridges – CUBITT, London (England); Die paar Unentwegten – Teil II – Galerie Christian Nagel – Köln, Cologne; 7x14 – Kalin Lindena – Staatliche Kunsthalle Baden-Baden, Baden-Baden
- 2008 Für alles gegen gut ist – Galerie Parisa Kind, Frankfurt/Main; Kunstverein Heilbronn, Heilbronn
- 2006 Hände wie Spiegel / Hands Like Mirrors – Galerie Bleich-Rossi, Vienna; Um Ein Tanz – Galerie Christian Nagel – Berlin, Berlin
- 2005 Lächelte Ernst – Galerie Bleich-Rossi, Vienna; Beim Namen – Meyer Riegger Karlsruhe, Karlsruhe
- 2004 "Find Dich Licht" – Galerie Christian Nagel – Köln, Cologne
- 2002 "Wir Nennen Einen Berg Nach Dir" – Galerie Christian Nagel – Berlin, Berlin; expecting rain – Meyer Riegger Karlsruhe, Karlsruhe
- 2001 Kunstverein Braunschweig e.V., Braunschweig
