= Elena Engel =

American film producer

- Born: Elena Francesca Engel; New York City
- Education: University of Oregon (B.A.); University of Washington (MA)
- Occupation: Producer

Elena F. Engel is a producer/director of film, video, radio, and audio for The Walt Disney Company, Amblin Entertainment, Simon & Schuster, UNICEF (United Nations), Western Publishing Company, National Public Radio, Warner Bros., Sesame Street, and the Disney Channel.

== Early life and education ==
Elena Engel was born in New York to actress Lillian Engel and theater director Sanford Engel. She attended high school at Point Loma in San Diego, California, and went on to get a B.A. in Psychology from Evergreen State College. Elena pursued graduate work in creative dramatics at the University of Washington, where she was a member of the Poncho's Children's Theatre ensemble. She then continued her studies at Actors Studio with Lee Strasberg in Hollywood, California.

== Career ==
Engel's career spans more than 20 years in the entertainment industry an award-winning writer, producer, and director of film, video, radio and audio recordings. During this time, she served as a creative resource to The Walt Disney Company, Warner Bros., Steven Spielberg's Amblin Entertainment, Simon & Schuster, Western Publishing Company, National Public Radio, Sesame Street, and UNICEF (United Nations).

=== Public Radio ===
As Director of Children's Programming at member station KWAX, her weekly show "Kidwax" enjoyed top creative honors from the Corporation for Public Broadcasting three years running. As a recipient of a CPB Producer's Grant with WGBH and a CPB Technical Engineering Grant, Elena went on to produce a radio series featuring traditional storytellers of the Northwest and funded by the National Endowment of the Arts. She also was a regular features contributor to NPR's "All Things Considered."

=== The Walt Disney Company ===
Joining The Walt Disney Company as Writer-Producer-Director of children's audio, Elena received a Grammy nomination, four Gold and two Platinum albums for her efforts. Later, as Executive Producer of Film and Video at Disney's Non-Theatrical division, Elena piloted more than seventeen award-winning live-action and animated films for the cable television, home video, and educational divisions. In addition, she was a creative development contributor to both the EPCOT Educational Pavilion at Walt Disney World and the Disney Channel.

=== Azimuth Productions ===
Following her work with Disney, Elena formed her own company, Azimuth Productions, producing videos and films with the talents of Michael Tucker, Joe Spano, Tempestt Bledsoe, Loretta Swit, Ally Sheedy, Giovanni Ribisi, and others. Through Azimuth, Elena also wrote, produced, and directed original audio recordings featuring the popular Tiny Toon Adventures, Looney Tunes, Super Mario Bros., Dennis the Menace, and Batman characters, as well as developed original children's program concepts for the television market. During this period, her film, "Listen to Me," a dramatic story about child abuse, won the prestigious Lillian Gish Award at the Women in Film International Film Festival.

== Philanthropy ==
Elena's humanitarian and non-profit projects have included travel around the world on behalf of UNICEF, producing programs televised in more than forty-five countries for its International Child Survival Campaign. Elena also completed consultation and video projects in support of Mercy Corp International, an NGO providing humanitarian aid and development assistance to communities worldwide. She served on its European Executive board while living in the United Kingdom for the last six years.

== Professional Credits ==
- THE WALT DISNEY COMPANY – Executive producer Film/Video Non-theatrical Five Cine-Golden Awards, Winner of Lillian Gish Award Women in Film Festival, Birmingham Intl. festival, and others.
- Audio Producer – Grammy Nomination, Four Gold, Two Platinum Albums Corporate Development Liaison to EPCOT Disney World, Orlando, Florida. Disney Channel-Development
- AZIMUTH PRODUCTIONS – President/owner, video/film production – Tempestt Bledsoe, Giovanni Ribisi, Ally Sheedy, Loretta Swit, Joe Spano, Michael Tucker. Audio recordings – Tiny Toon Adventures, Looney Tunes, Super Mario Bros., Dennis the Menace and Batman.
- NATIONAL PUBLIC RADIO – Director of Children's Programming. Top CPB Creative honors for three years. Recipient of CPB Producer's Grant at WGBH, CPB Technical Training Grant, and a Radio series grant from National Endowment of the Arts.
- UNITED NATIONS – Producer/Director of educational television programs distributed worldwide for UNICEF's Child Survival Campaign. Official Selection-Annecy International Animation Festival, Switzerland
- MERCY-CORPS INTERNATIONAL – World Ambassador, Executive board member, Producer of support videos, and Director of Corporate Development in NYC. Consultant to Sesame Street Productions/Mercy Corps video partnership for Haitian earthquake victims.
