= Gatja Helgart Rothe =

German-American artist (1935–2007)

- Born: Helgart Riedel; March 15, 1935; Beuthen, Poland
- Died: August 3, 2007 (aged 72)

Gatja Helgart Rothe (March 15, 1935 – August 3, 2007) was a German-American artist known for her printmaking, especially mezzotint. She was also a draftswoman and painter. After living and working in Europe, she briefly traveled through South America before moving to New York City in the 1970s and later, California. Her commercial success was primarily based on mezzotints and paintings commissioned and handled by galleries, dealers, and private collectors in the United States, Europe and Japan.

== Career ==
In 1956, at age twenty-one, Riedel hitchhiked to southern Germany, where her brother was studying design at the art academy in Pforzheim. She enrolled in painting and drawing classes there and met her future husband, Curt Rothe, a painting professor and post-impressionist artist.

In 1973, her husband died and her son Peter moved in with her. At the time she was designing jewelry for Tiffany's and other jewelers. In 1976 Rothe signed a contract with Hammer Galleries in New York. She worked in a studio at 193 Second Avenue in Lower Manhattan. In 1978 she was listed in both Who's Who in American Art and Who's Who in America.

In 1978, Rothe traveled to Los Angeles to visit her lover Maurie Symonds, who owned several galleries in California showing her work. Rothe became fascinated with Carmel-by-the-Sea, California and decided to move there, buying a house by in Carmel-by-the-Sea, although she kept a storage space and a studio in New York.

== Work ==
=== Mezzotints ===
Rothe's highly detailed mezzotints focused on surreal landscapes, intricately rendered horses, and graceful dancers. Rothe started all her prints by sketching a simple drawing directly onto the plate with a drypoint tool. She used a rocker to develop the background, rolling and rocking it side to side and piercing the plate with tiny holes for the ink. Using a drypoint tool she further developed the fine details and figures of the drawing. Rothe spent approximately 500 hours working on each plate.

=== Paintings ===
Rothe did not keep track of most of the paintings she sold, but the ones that are known show her interest in transparencies. Through allowing layers of paint to dry and using different types of strokes to achieve slight shifts in tones and hues, most of her city and nature landscapes, as well as portraits, display an intricate layering.

=== "Gerotica" ===
Completed in 1987 but never shown during her lifetime, Rothe's tempera works are depictions of sex and intimacy between aging couples, revealing Rothe's typical layering of paint. Rothe's son Peter discovered these erotic scenes with geriatric bodies ("gerotica") paintings and other artworks years after her death. In November 2015 the gerotica became the center for the exhibition Seven Drawings at the Walter and McBean Galleries of the San Francisco Art Institute.

== Sources ==
- The Creative Woman. Governors State University. 1986-01-01.
- Smith, Donald E. (2004-01-01). American Printmakers of the Twentieth Century: A Bibliography. Donald E. Smith. ISBN 9781878282286.
