= Heide Hinrichs =

German artist

- Born: 1976 (age 49–50); Oldenburg, Germany
- Occupation: Artist
- Known for: Installation and Sculpture

Heide Hinrichs is a German artist living and working out of Brussels, Belgium. Hinrichs works mainly in installation and sculpture manipulating everyday objects and found materials to symbolize emotion, mental states and gestures of the body in a post-minimalist style. As much Hinrichs' intuitive conceptual oeuvre addresses questions of movement, location and nomadism.

== Early life and career ==
Heide Hinrichs was born in 1976 in Oldenburg, Germany. From 1996 to 2000, she studied at the University of Kassel, then at the Dresden Academy of Fine Arts in Dresden, Germany for another two years under Ulrike Grossarth. Hinrichs completed a two-year postgraduate degree at the HISK, Antwerp (2006). She currently teaches at the Royal Academy of Fine Arts Antwerp.

== Notable shows ==
- ringing critical forests, Kiosk, Ghent, Belgium, 2020
- red offering, Whitehouse Gallery Lovenjoel, Belgium, 2017
- Echoes, Kunstverein Heidelberg, Heidelberg, Germany, 2012
- Rose Belongs to the Lotus, Circulation waterside contemporary, London, UK, 2012
- Borrowed Tails, Seattle Art Museum, Seattle, USA, 2009

== Notable publications ==
- shelf documents: art library as practice, edited by Heide Hinrichs, Jo-ey Tang, Elizabeth Haines, designed by Sara De Bondt, published by Track Report, Antwerp and b_books, Berlin, 2021
- Morning Change, with an essay by Elizabeth Haines, posture editions nr. 33, Ghent, 2019

== Recognition ==
- Villa Romana Prize, Florence, Florence, Italy, 2013
- MMCA Seoul International Residency Program, Seoul, South Korea, 2014
