= Stefan Thater =

German artist

- Born: 1968 (age 57–58); Hamburg, West Germany
- Education: University of Fine Arts of Hamburg

Stefan Thater (born 1968 Hamburg) is a German artist. He graduated from the Academy of Art, Hamburg (HIBK) in 1998. He lives and works in Berlin.

== Awards ==
- 2000 Travelling grant by “Junge Kunst in Hamburg e.V.”
- 2003 Working grant by the city of Hamburg
- 2004 Working grant by the “Stiftung Kunstfonds”
- 2006 Villa Romana prize

== Exhibitions ==
2010

- Dial Shop

2008

- Hotel Gallery, London

2007

- “flipside exterior” at Overduin and Kite, Los Angeles

2006

- Galerie Buchholtz, Cologne

2005

- Galerie Daniel Buchholz, Cologne (individual exhibition)
- Corvi-Mora, London
- "Alles. In einer Nacht", Tanya Bonakdar Gallery, New York

2004

- "Teil 1 Müllberg", Galerie Daniel Buchholz, Cologne

2003

- "Katze, Clown, Roboter", Galerie Karin Guenther, Hamburg (individual exhibition)

2002

- "Metropolitan", Galerie Karin Guenther / Galerie Jürgen Becker, Hamburg
- Galerie Borgmann-Nathusius, Cologne

2001

- "Neue Kunst in Hamburg", Kunsthaus Hamburg

1999

- Galerie Daniel Buchholz, Köln (individual exhibition)
- "Titles for Drawings", AC Project Room, New York
- "Akademie Isotrop", Galerie Daniel Buchholz, Cologne
- Gesellschaft der Freunde junger Kunst, Baden-Baden

1998

- "Akademie Isotrop", Contemporary Fine Arts, Berlin
- "El Nino", Museum Abteiberg, Mönchengladbach
- Reality Investment, Ulm
- "Akademie Isotrop", Künstlerhaus Stuttgart

1997

- Galerie Nomadenoase, Hamburg (individual exhibition)
- "Austerlitz Autrement", Espace Austerlitz, Paris for Galerie Daniel Buchholz (individual exhibition)

1996

- "Glockengeschrei nach Deutz", Galerie Daniel Buchholz, Cologne
