= Amelia Umuhire =

Rwandan-German film director, producer, and screenwriter

- Born: 1991 (age 34–35); Kigali
- Occupations: Film director, audiovisual artist, screenwriter
- Years active: 2015–present

Amelia Umuhire (born 1991) is a Rwandan-German film director, producer, and screenwriter.

== Biography ==
Umuhire was born in Kigali, Rwanda in 1991. In 2015 she directed the web series Polyglot where she cast her sister Amanda Mukasonga as the main character of the three episodic short films which were uploaded on YouTube in 2015. The series was screened at various international festivals such as Tribeca Film Festival, Festival D'Angers, International Short Film Festival Oberhausen and art galleries and museums such as the Victoria and Albert Museum. The series won "Best International Web Series" at the Festival Tous Ecrans in Geneva and Best German Web Series at the Webfest Berlin. Her short film "Mugabo" (2017) was screened at the International Film Festival Rotterdam at the Blackstar Film Festival where it won Best Experimental Film, Berlin Biennale, MCA Chicago, MOCA Los Angeles as part of the Black Radical Imagination Showcase curated by Darol Kae and Jheanelle Brown.In 2018, she directed a commissioned video used as a performance piece for the twentieth-anniversary tour of The Miseducation of Lauryn Hill. In 2018 she wrote, directed and recorded the audio piece "Vaterland" which was nominated for the Prix Europa. She has exhibited her work and additional works at solo and group shows in Berlin, Houston, Cologne, Braunschweig, Florence and Kigali. She is a laureate of the Villa Romana Award, the oldest German art prize. She writes for German TV and produces video art, documentaries and audio pieces for English and German audiences.

Her work has been exhibited at several film festivals, including MOCA Los Angeles, MCA Chicago, Tribeca Film Festival, Smithsonian African American Film Festival, International Film Festival Rotterdam.

== Filmography ==
- 2015: Polyglot (Web series)
- 2016: Mugabo
- 2019: King Who
- 2020: Kana
