= Simon Dybbroe Møller =

German painter

- Born: 1976 (age 49–50); Aarhus, Denmark
- Education: Kunstakademie Düsseldorf; Städelschule Academy of Fine Art
- Occupation: Artist

Simon Dybbroe Møller (born 1976) is a visual artist.

In 1999–2001, he attended Kunstakademie Düsseldorf, where he studied with Magdalena Jetelowa. In 2001–2005, he studied with Tobias Rehberger at Städelschule Academy of Fine Art in Frankfurt. He lives and works in Berlin. Since 2019 he is a Professor and head of the School of Sculpture at The Royal Danish Academy of Fine Arts.

== Work ==
Dybbroe Møller's work has been described as dealing with "the relationship between the most fundamental sensate experiences and the increasing remove and autonomy of representational media". In his shows carefully chosen and often only slightly altered objects are exhibited alongside video and photography. Speaking of these found objects Dybbroe Møller has stated: "I like to think that some things invent themselves. Or come into being for reasons so complex or suppressed or unarticulated that it seems better to see these objects as almost entirely independent from us. They have slipped into the world or have been hushed into existence. These objects, then, are nonverbal articulations of our collective subconscious". In the same manner Simon Dybbroe Møller's video work often circles around a carefully selected single object. In his Anachronism Trilogy, made between 2012 and 2018 he dealt with a car, a bird, and a poet respectively. One critic noted of these objects that "the protagonists of Simon Dybbroe Møller’s films are time travelers: conduits for time’s passage at different speeds"

== Other ==
Dybbroe Møller's practice seems equally preoccupied with various collaborative modes of production as with individual exhibition making. In 2019 Dybbroe Møller and Post Brothers, curated the show Mercury at Tallinn Art Hall based on an essay on photographic phenomena by the artist. In collaboration with artist Nina Beier he is the founder of the experimental exhibition project AYE-AYE. Each AYE-AYE exhibition consists of a juxtaposition of two objects. Sometimes the objects are works of art sometimes they are things from entirely different realms. With curator Helga Just Christoffersen, Dybbroe Møller organizes the performance and lecture series Why Words Now. Here the paradoxical over abundance of words in the field of visual arts is probed and tested. Dybbroe Møller also runs a film screening program called Film Club Lifeblood, where the camera's relationship to the human body, the animal and the machine is examined.

== Awards ==
- 2006 Villa Romana prize
- 2008 Ars Viva prize
