= Neuer Berliner Kunstverein =

Art association in Berlin, Germany

The Neue Berliner Kunstverein (English: "New Berlin Art Association"), abbreviated nbk, n.b.k. or NBK, is an art association founded in Berlin in 1969 that is dedicated to promoting contemporary art. The association has permanent exhibition rooms on Chausseestrasse in Berlin-Mitte. The Artothek, which has been operated by the NBK since 1970, is an art loan library with 4,000 works of art that can be borrowed. The Video-Forum, founded in 1971, is a collection of video art that today comprises more than 1700 works.

== Bibliography ==
- Rosemarie Bremer, Lucie Schauer: 10 Jahre NBK: Bilanz und Rechenschaft aus Berlin. Neuer Berliner Kunstverein, Berlin 1979.
- Rosemarie Bremer, Renate Grisebach: 20 Jahre NBK: das zweite Jahrzehnt. Neuer Berliner Kunstverein, Berlin 1989.
- Marius Nefarious, Sophie Goltz, Kathrin Becker (Hrsg.): Kunst und Öffentlichkeit: 40 Jahre Neuer Berliner Kunstverein. König, Köln 2009, (ISBN 978-3-86560-715-7). (Catalog on the occasion of the exhibition of the same name in the NBK from March 28 to May 10, 2009.)
