= Stephanie Taylor (American artist) =

Stephanie Taylor (born 1971) is a United States artist based in Los Angeles.

Taylor was born in Port Jefferson, New York. She works in sculpture, illustration, sound and performance. All her work is based on sound, around which she builds narratives through other media. She is interested in the relationships between words, art and sound and often makes soundtracks to accompany her exhibitions.
