= List of German women photographers =

This is a list of women photographers who were born in Germany or whose works are closely associated with that country.

== A ==
- Louise Abel (1841–1907), German-born Norwegian photographer
- Gertrud Arndt (1903–2000), created self-portraits from around 1930
- Ursula Arnold (1929–2012), street scenes in Berlin and Leipzig during the German Democratic Republic
- Ellen Auerbach (1906–2004), see United States

== B ==
- Tina Bara (born 1962), freelance artistic photographer
- Uta Barth (born 1958), art photography
- Carla Bartheel (1902–1983), film actress and photographer
- Hilla Becher (1934–2015), together with her brother Bernd, produced typologies of industrial buildings and structures
- Bertha Beckmann (1815–1901), possibly Germany's first professional woman photographer
- Katharina Behrend (1888–1973), see Netherlands
- Sibylle Bergemann (1941–2010), chronicler of social life in East Germany
- Ella Bergmann-Michel (1896–1971), abstract painter, photographer, filmmaker
- Ruth Bernhard (1905–2006), German-born American lesbian photographer
- Emilie Bieber (1810–1884), pioneer who opened a studio in Hamburg as early as 1852
- Aenne Biermann (1898–1933), of the New Objectivity movement
- Ilse Bing (1899–1998), versatile photographer (fashion, architecture, etc.) from the 1920s to the 1950s, often using remarkable compositions
- Anna Blume (1937–2011), staged photographs and installations, often depicting herself and her husband Bernhard
- Dorothy Bohm (1924–2023), see United Kingdom
- Jenny Bossard-Biow (1813 – after 1858), possibly the first woman in Germany to have made daguerreotypes
- Marianne Breslauer (1909–2001), active in the early 1930s
- Käthe Buchler (1876–1930), documented WWI in Braunschweig, Germany
- Traude Bührmann (born 1942), writer, journalist, photographer

== C ==
- Gladys Chai von der Laage (born 1953), sports photographer
- Rosemarie Clausen (1907–1990), theatre and portrait photographer

== D ==
- Wanda von Debschitz-Kunowski (1870–1935), portrait photographer, educator
- Andrea Diefenbach (born 1974), documentary photographer
- Minya Diez-Dührkoop (1873–1929), professional photographer with a studio in Berlin

== E ==
- Frauke Eigen (born 1969), photographer of the aftermath of war in Kosovo

== F ==
- Claudia Fährenkemper (born 1959), landscape photographer
- Gertrude Fehr (1895–1996), did solarisation photos
- Gisèle Freund (1908–2000), see France

== G ==
- Yishay Garbasz (born 1970), interdisciplinary artist in large format, photographer.
- Marie Goslich (1859–1936), photographer of social issues, etc., for magazines
- Sophia Goudstikker (1865–1924), portraitist and women's rights activist
- Liselotte Grschebina (1908–1994), see Israel
- Julia Gunther (born 1979), documentary photographer

== H ==
- Lisel Haas (1898–1989), German-born Jewish photographer who moved to Britain
- Esther Haase (born 1966), photographer, film director
- Elisabeth Hase (1905–1991), commercial and documentary photographer
- Alma Haser (born 1989), portrait photographer
- Sandra Hastenteufel (born 1966), contemporary artist, photographer
- Roswitha Hecke (born 1944), photojournalist
- Annemarie Heinrich (1912–2005), see Argentina
- Nanna Heitmann (born 1994)
- Lotte Herrlich (1883–1956), photographer of naturism during the 1920s
- Juliane Herrmann (born 1989), photographer curating photography exhibitions
- Hannah Höch (1889–1978), pioneer of photomontage, participated in the Dada movement
- Marta Hoepffner (1912–2000), artist, photographer
- Candida Höfer (born 1944), highly precise large-format depictions of guest workers in Germany, interiors, zoos, capturing the psychology of social architecture
- Sabine Hornig (born 1964), photographer and contemporary artist depicting architecture and urban life
- Walde Huth (1923–2011), fashion photographer

== J ==
- Lotte Jacobi (1896–1990), initially family photography, then shots of Tajikistan and Uzbekistan, from 1935 studio in Manhattan, portraits of celebrities
- Charlotte Joël (c. 1882–1943), Jewish portrait photographer
- Genja Jonas (1895-1938), portrait photographer

== K ==
- Ingeborg Kahlenberg (1920–1996), photographer for the Dutch resistance
- Johanna Keimeyer (born 1982), photographer, artist
- Annette Kelm (born 1975), contemporary artist, photographer
- Astrid Kirchherr (1938–2020), photographed the Beatles before they became famous
- Emma Kirchner (1830–1909), trained in Leipzig, moved to Netherlands as first woman photographer in Delft area
- Barbara Klemm (active 1959–2004), press photographer
- Herlinde Koelbl (born 1939, photographer, portraits, projects with sociological context
- Katrin Korfmann (born 1971), fine art photographer
- Monika Kropshofer (born 1952), painter, photographer
- Germaine Krull (1897–1985), photographer, activist
- Marie Kundt (1870–1932), photographer, educator

== L ==
- Lisa Larsen (1925–1959), pioneering woman photojournalist
- Erna Lendvai-Dircksen (1883–1962), photographer of rural individuals, collected in books that sold well in the Nazi period
- Esther Levine (born 1970), urban and street photography
- Alice Lex-Nerlinger (1893–1975), artist in the media of painting, photography, photomontage and photograms
- Annelise Löffler (1914–2000), active in the world of dance
- Barbara Luisi (fl 2000s), photographer and musician
- Loretta Lux (born 1969), fine art photographer known for surreal portraits of young children
- Rut Blees Luxemburg (born 1967), photographer of night scenes

== M ==
- Melanie Manchot (born 1966), specializes in photographs of people in public, sometimes inviting them to undress
- Jeanne Mandello (1907–2001), modern experimental photographer, studio in Paris, later moved to South America
- Anne Menke (born 1967), German-born editorial photographer, based in New York
- Hansel Mieth (1909–1998), see United States
- Lucia Moholy (1894–1989), see Czechoslovakia, Czech Republic
- Hedda Morrison (1908–1991), early photographs of Peking, Hong Kong and Sarawak, later lived and exhibited in Australia

== N ==
- Cathleen Naundorf (born 1968), artist and photographer
- Anja Niedringhaus (1965–2014), photojournalist, Pulitzer Prize winner
- Simone Nieweg (born 1962), landscape photographer
- Margret Nissen (born 1938), photographer of architecture
- Sonya Noskowiak (1900–1975), German-American photographer

== O ==
- Hildegard Ochse (1935–1997), freelance photographer, educator
- Li Osborne (1883–1968), German-born British photographer and sculptor

== P ==
- Helga Paris (1938–2024), photographer specializing in East-German street scenes
- Angelika Platen (born in 1942), portrait photographer
- Bettina Pousttchi (born 1971), German-Iranian sculptor, photographer, filmmaker
- Barbara Probst (born 1964), contemporary artist, photographer
- Anne-Katrin Purkiss (born 1959), portrait photographer

== R ==
- Katja Rahlwes (born 1967), fashion photographer
- Elfriede Reichelt (1883–1953), fine art photographer
- Claudia Reinhardt (born 1964), contemporary photographer
- Regina Relang (1906–1989), fashion photographer
- Evelyn Richter (1930–2021), art photographer active in social documentary photography
- Ursula Richter (1886–1946), dance and theatre photography in Dresden
- Leni Riefenstahl (1902–2003), film director and dancer who also published photos of the Nuba tribes in Sudan and, later, marine life
- Frieda Riess (1890–c. 1955), German portrait photographer in the 1920s with a studio in central Berlin
- Tata Ronkholz (1940–1997)
- Hildegard Rosenthal (1913–1990), German photographer who became a photojournalist and a noted photographer after her emigration to Brazil.

== S ==
- Eva Sandberg-Xiao (1911–2001), photographer in Russia and China
- Thyra Schmidt (born 1974), art photography and new media artist
- Stefanie Schneider (born 1968), photographer of the American west
- Ursula Schulz-Dornburg (born 1938), photographer in black and white
- Gundula Schulze Eldowy (born 1954), art photographer
- Hanni Schwarz (born c. 1901), nude and portrait photographer
- Else Seifert (1879–1968), architectural photographer
- Heji Shin (born 1976), art and fashion photographer
- Katharina Sieverding (born 1944), self-portraitist
- Annegret Soltau (born 1946), stitched photomontages of the human body
- Grete Stern (1904–1999), see Argentina
- Liselotte Strelow (1908–1981), employed by Kodak

== T ==
- Gerda Taro (1910–1937), early female war photographer, remembered for her coverage of the Spanish Civil War, especially Valencia, published in Life and Illustrated London News
- Elsa Thiemann (1910–1981), street photographer who trained at the Bauhaus
- Abisag Tüllmann (1935–1996), photojournalist

== U ==
- Ellen von Unwerth (born 1954), photographer of erotic femininity

== V ==
- Jutta Vialon (1917–2004), based in Bremen
- Christa Frieda Vogel (born 1960), documentary photographer

== W ==
- Bertha Wehnert-Beckmann (1815–1901), Germany's first professional female photographer with a studio in Leipzig from 1843
- Anna Werner (born 1941), associated with Der Harem
- Marianne Wex (1937–2020), feminist photographer and author
- Ruth Wilhelmi (1904–1977), stage photographer
- Madeline Winkler-Betzendahl (1899–1995), fashion and stage photographer
- Anne Winterer (1894–1938), studio in Düsseldorf, portraits, industrial subjects
- Ursula Wolff Schneider (1906–1977), photographer and photojournalist

== Y ==
- Yva (1900–c. 1942), German Jewish photographer, multiple exposed images

== Z ==
- Bertha Zillessen (1872–1936)
- Bettina von Zwehl (born 1971), portrait photographer, based in London

== See also ==
- List of women photographers
