= Jeanne Mandello =

German modern artist (1907–2001)

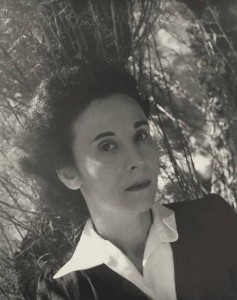
- Jeanne Mandello, c. 1948
- Born: Johanna Mandello; 18 October 1907; Frankfurt, Germany
- Died: 17 December 2001 (aged 94); Barcelona, Spain
- Known for: Photography
- Spouse: Arno Grünebaum (m. 1934–1954)
- Website: jeannemandello.com

Jeanne Mandello (née Johanna Mandello; 18 October 1907, Frankfurt – 17 December 2001, Barcelona) was a German modern artist and experimental photographer.

== Early years and education ==
Mandello grew up in an art-loving, secular Jewish family in Frankfurt. Her mother, Amalia Margarethe Mandello, born Seligsohn, was a kindergarten teacher and died when Johanna was 14 years old; her father, Hermann Mandello, was until 1934 Director of the department store Kaufhaus Wronker. She graduated from high school in 1925. The following year, she began studying photography at Lette-Verein. In a time when it was difficult for a woman to get attention as an artist, photography opened a way into the art world. Inspired by the spirit of freedom in Berlin in the 1920s, the women's movement offered an opportunity to go out, attended theater performances, concerts, exhibitions and decide on the model of the "new woman", imitating Grete Stern and Ellen Auerbach who wore pants and short hair. In 1927, she studied at the studio of Paul Wolff and Alfred Tritschler. Through Wolff, she became familiar with Leica Camera photography. Back in Berlin, she returned to Lette and finished her studies. Using a Leica film camera, she photographed portraits, landscapes and scenes of everyday life. In 1929, she taught in Frankfurt, creating a studio at her parents' house. Here, she collaborated with the photographer Nathalie Reuter (1911–1990), a former classmate and friend. In 1932, she met Arno Grünebaum. Under Mandello's guidance, he learned photography. In 1933, they married. Being Jewish and being aware of the coming danger, they left Germany in 1934 and began in Paris a new life.

== Career ==
In Paris, she changed her first name Johanna into the French form, Jeanne. Like other modern photographers of the Weimar Republic, Mandello found inspiration during her exile in Paris. She was influenced by the Nouvelle Vision; by Man Ray, Brassaï and Doisneau, in redefined photography. They experimented with new techniques, unusual camera angles, picture cutouts, exposures and photomontages. Mandello and Grunbaum specialized in commercial and portrait photography and established themselves as fashion photographers. In 1937, they opened a studio in 17th Arrondissement under the name "Mandello". "Mandello" did work for Fémina, Harper’s Bazaar and Vogue, as well as the fashion houses of Balenciaga, Guerlain, Maggy Rouff, and Creed. Occasionally, they worked with the photographer Hermann Landshoff, who had also fled Nazi Germany. After the outbreak of World War II, Mandello and her husband were considered Alien Enemies within the French Republic and were forced to leave Paris in early 1940. They had to leave everything behind: the photo studio, camera equipment, archived works and negatives. They were allowed to take only 14 kilos of luggage. They came to the village of Dognen where she helped out in the infirmary. Her German citizenship was withdrawn on 28 October 1940. With visas to Uruguay, Mandello and Grunebaum left France and started a new life in South America where she exhibited beginning in 1943. Her new work included architecture, landscapes, photograms, portraits, and solarisations. In 1952, she exhibited at Museum of Modern Art, Rio de Janeiro, and two years later, she separated from her husband, and moved to Brazil to be with the journalist, Lothar Bauer. With Bauer, she moved to Barcelona at the end of the decade where she worked the rest of her life. She married Bauer, and they adopted a daughter, Isabel, in 1970. Mandello died in Barcelona in 2001.

== Selected works and exhibitions ==
- 1943: Exposición del Niño. Fotografías artísticas de la Señora Jeanne Mandello, Montevideo
- 1952: Mandello (Jeanne Mandello und Arno Grünebaum), Museu de Arte Moderna do Rio de Janeiro
- 1995: Les dones fotògrafes a la República de Weimar. 1919–1933, Fundación “La Caixa”, Barcelona
- 1997: Mandello. Fotografías 1928–1997. Retrospektive zum 90. Geburtstag von Jeanne Mandello. Sala de Exposiciones del Casal de Sarrià y Sala de Exposiciones del FAD (Foment de les Arts Decoratives), Barcelona
  - Ausstellungskatalog: Mercedes Valdivieso (Hrsg.): Mandello. Fotografías 1928–1997, Casal de Sarria, Barcelona 1997.
- 2012/2013: Imágenes de una fotógrafa exiliada: Jeanne Mandello, Alliance Française, Montevideo u. a.
  - Ausstellungskatalog: Imágenes de una fotógrafa exiliada: Jeanne Mandello, Centro Cultural Alliance Française, Montevideo 2012. Einführung: Sandra Nagel (pdf).
- 2014: Ende eines Zeitalters. Künstlerische Praktiken und Techniken analoger Fotografie, Museum Folkwang, Essen
- 2015: Solarized, Nailya Alexander Gallery, New York
- 2018: De l’autre côté. Photographies de Jeanne Mandello, Hildegard Rosenthal et Grete Stern. Maison de l’Amérique latine, Paris.
