= Hildegard Rosenthal =

Brazilian photographer

- Hildegard Rosenthal (self portrait, c. 1938)
- Born: Hildegard Baum; March 25, 1913; Zürich, Switzerland
- Died: September 16, 1990 (aged 77); São Paulo, Brazil
- Education: Paul Wolff
- Occupation: photojournalist
- Spouse: Walter Rosenthal

Hildegard Baum Rosenthal (March 25, 1913 – September 16, 1990) was a Swiss-born Brazilian photographer and the first woman photojournalist in Brazil. She was among the European photographers who emigrated to Brazil in the years surrounding World War II and brought new approaches to Brazilian photography and photojournalism.

== Life and career ==
Rosenthal was born in Zurich, Switzerland. Until her adolescence, she lived in Frankfurt (Germany), where she studied pedagogy from 1929 until 1933. She lived in Paris between 1934 and 1935. Upon her return to Frankfurt, she studied photography for about 18 months in a program led by Paul Wolff. Wolff emphasized small, portable cameras that used 35 mm film. These were a recent innovation at the time, and could be used unobtrusively for street photography. She also studied photographic laboratory techniques at the Gaedel Institute.

In this same period, she had entered a relationship with Walter Rosenthal. Rosenthal was Jewish, and Jews were increasingly persecuted in Germany in the 1930s under the National Socialist (Nazi) regime that took power in 1933. Walter Rosenthal emigrated to Brazil in 1936. Hildegard joined him in São Paulo in 1937. That same year she began working as a laboratory supervisor at the Kosmos photographic materials and services company. A few months later, the agency Press Information hired her as a photojournalist and she did news reports for national and international newspapers. Rosenthal became the first woman photojournalist in Brazil and was among the European immigrant photographers whose work introduced new approaches to photography in São Paulo. During this period, she took photographs of the city of São Paulo and the state countryside of Rio de Janeiro and other cities in southern Brazil, as well as portraying several personalities from the São Paulo cultural scene, such as the painter Lasar Segall, the writers Guilherme de Almeida and Jorge Amado, the humorist Aparicio Torelly (Barão de Itararé) and the cartoonist Belmonte. Her images sought to capture the artist at his moment of creation, in obvious connection with his spirit of reporter. She interrupted her professional activity in 1948, after the birth of her first daughter. And in 1959, after her husband died, she took over the management of her family's company.

== Artistic trajectory ==
Her photographs remained little known until 1974, when art historian Walter Zanini held a retrospective of her work at the Museum of Contemporary Art of the University of São Paulo. The following year the Museum of Image and Sound of São Paulo (MIS) was opened with the exhibition Memória Paulistana, by Rosenthal. In 1996 the Moreira Salles Institute acquired more than 3,000 of her negatives, in which urban scenes of São Paulo from the 1930s and 1940s stood out, during which time the city underwent a vertiginous growth, both material and cultural. Other negatives were donated by her during her life to the Lasar Segall Museum.

"Photography without people does not interest me," she said at the Museum of Image and Sound of São Paulo in 1981.

== Exhibitions ==
- Hildegard Rosenthal: fotografias no Museu de Arte Contemporânea da Universidade de São Paulo, MAC/USP (1974: São Paulo)
- Bienal Internacional de São Paulo XIV e XV (1977 e 1979: São Paulo)
- Trienal de Fotografia no Museu de Arte Moderna de São Paulo, MAM/SP (1980: São Paulo)
- Um olhar feminino dos anos 40 na galeria Fotóptica (1993: São Paulo)
- O Olhar e o Ficar. A Procura do Paraíso na Pinacoteca do Estado de São Paulo (1994: São Paulo)
- Brasil 1920-1950: da Antropofagia a Brasília, Institut Valencia d’Art Modern, (2000: Valencia, Espanha)
- Profissão Fotógrafo, de Hildegard Rosenthal e Horacio Coppola, no Museu Lasar Segall (2010: São Paulo)
- A São Paulo de Hildegard Rosenthal na galeria DOC Foto (2013: São Paulo). Exhibition honoring the centennial of Rosenthal's birth.
- De l’autre côté. Photographies de Jeanne Mandello, Hildegard Rosenthal, et Grete Stern. Maison de l’Amérique latine (2018: Paris).
- The New Woman Behind the Camera. National Gallery of Art (October 31, 2021 — January 30, 2022). This exhibition was organized by the National Gallery of Art in association with the Metropolitan Museum of Art. The exhibition is curated by Andrea Nelson, associate curator in the department of photographs at the National Gallery of Art.
