= 24th World Scout Jamboree =

2019 Scouting event in West Virginia, US

- Theme: Unlock a New World
- Location: The Summit Bechtel Family National Scout Reserve
- Country: United States, Canada and Mexico
- Coordinates: 37°55′35″N 81°09′00″W
- Date: 22 July to 2 August 2019
- Executive Director: Marty Walsh
Previous; 23rd World Scout Jamboree	Next; 25th World Scout Jamboree
- Website http://2019wsj.org/

The 24th World Scout Jamboree (Note: The 24th World Scout Jamboree is commonly referred to by the Boy Scouts of America as the 2019 World Scout Jamboree.) (Spanish: 24º Jamboree Scout Mundial, French: 24e Jamboree Scout Mondial) was held at the Summit Bechtel Family National Scout Reserve in West Virginia from 22 July to 2 August 2019. The hosting duties were split between the Boy Scouts of America, Scouts Canada, and Asociación de Scouts de México. The theme was Unlock a New World. Over 40,000 Scouts and leaders from 152 nations attended.

== Program ==
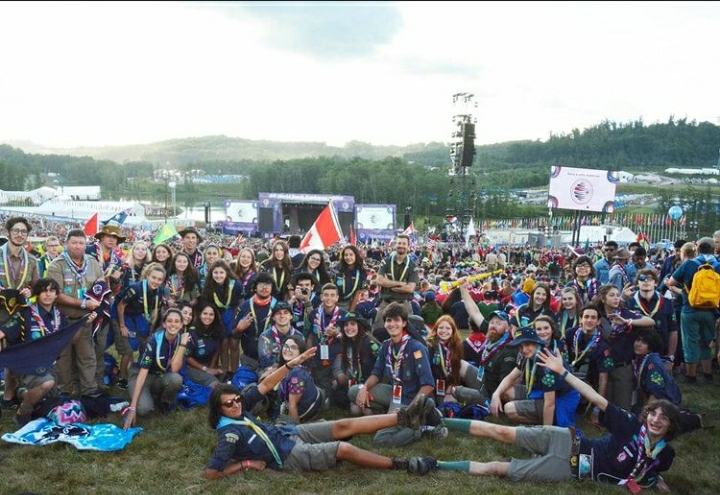
Scouts of the União dos Escoteiros do Brasil at the jamboree site.

=== Sustainability ===
The Sustainability Treehouse was a living education center for visitors to the Summit Bechtel Reserve, not only providing information, but also immersing visitors in the concept of sustainability. Between the local timber used to build the structure, the rainwater recovery system, and the wind and solar generated energy, stream restoration, recycling and geothermal heat were just a few examples of the additional sustainability efforts practiced at the Summit.

=== Global Development Village ===
At the Global Development Village, Scouts had the opportunity to learn about global issues and how Scouting can help provide a solution. Many organizations were on site from across the globe to showcase how Scouts can take what they learned at the Jamboree and translate that into helping in their home country.

=== Faith and Beliefs ===
The Faith and Beliefs zone was an area where Scouts could learn about the different religions of the world and their history and support of Scouting. Jamboree attendees also had the opportunity to participate in religious services according to their own beliefs and traditions. The Messengers of Peace program also had a booth at the Faiths and Beliefs tent.

=== Cultural Experience Day ===
Scouts had the opportunity to share their culture with other Scouts of the world through, music, dance, games, food and more. A unity show was hosted in the evening at the Summit Stadium.

=== Daily Events/Ceremonies ===
During the Jamboree, Scouts had the opportunity to witness and participate in many special activities, starting each morning with a flag raising ceremony, special Jamboree guests, musical performances, aircraft flyovers, and campfires.

=== Stadium Experience ===
The opening and closing ceremony took place at the AT&T Summit Stadium which showcased the best of Scouting.

=== Season of Service ===
The Season of Service, supported by the World Organization of the Scout Movement (WOSM), gave every Scout the opportunity to be involved in community service and to share their experiences with others prior to the start of the 24th World Scout Jamboree.

=== Trading ===
Patch trading was popular at the World Scout Jamboree. Scouts from all over the world traded patches from local events and Jamboree-issued patches. Also, the Jamboree issued national customized neckerchiefs or scarves, which were traded as well. Several unofficial trading spots were set up around the Summit on cots or blankets. One major trading location was at the Scott Visitor Center at the entrance of the Summit.

=== Novus ===
The Jamboree issued a piece of technology called the Novus. It was placed on the arm and could electronically send a Scout's contact information to another Scout and was a contest to see who could collect the most contacts. This was referred to as clicking and quickly became a game among Scouts. The Novus was also used to collect "badges" by completing various activities, which then awards points to the player. These points were another competition among Scouts, with a leaderboard ranking Scouts by points. The Novus devices were also activated remotely, surprising wearers as they contributed to lighting effects during the closing ceremony/stadium show.

== Activities ==
=== Physical activities ===
- Amateur Radio Station NA1WJ
- BMX
- Mountain Biking
- Skateboarding
- Zip lining
- Boulder Climbing
- Rock Climbing
- Kayaking
- River Rafting
- Scuba
- Stand up Paddle boarding
- Shooting
- Archery
- Water Reality
- Aerial Courses
- Clicking (Novus)

=== Food Houses ===
Many food houses were open during the Jamboree, with ten stalls serving dishes typical of the countries of their origin. Countries include, but are not limited to, the United States of America, Canada, the United Kingdom, Italy, Brazil, Chile, Colombia, Netherlands, Portugal, and Germany.

== 24th World Scout Jamboree in the arts ==
During the 24th World Scout Jamboree, the German photographer Juliane Herrmann developed part of “Attitude,” a documentary photography project on scouting. She took a series of portraits of participants in the Jamboree, including representatives of 113 nations. The pictures were part of exhibitions in Cologne, Dortmund, and Oldenburg. This work was awarded by Photoszene in 2021.
