= Dr. Erich Salomon Award =

Achievement award for photojournalists

The Dr. Erich Salomon Award (Dr.-Erich-Salomon-Preis), dedicated to Erich Salomon, is a lifetime achievement award for photojournalists given by the German Society for Photography (Deutsche Gesellschaft für Photographie, DGPh).

== Winners ==
- 1971 Stern magazine
- 1972 du magazine
- 1973 Avenue magazine
- 1974 Epoca magazine
- 1975 Personenbeschreibung (ZDF series)
- 1976 Zeitmagazin
- 1977 Bild der Wissenschaft magazine
- 1978 National Geographic magazine
- 1979 Der 7. Sinn
- 1980 Geo magazine
- 1981 Picture service of Deutsche Presse-Agentur (DPA)
- 1982 World Press Photo
- 1983 Lotte Jacobi - Tim N. Gidal
- 1984 Frankfurter Allgemeine Magazin
- 1985 Robert Frank
- 1986 Peter Magubane
- 1987 Josef Heinrich Darchinger
- 1988 Sebastião Salgado
- 1989 Barbara Klemm
- 1990 Cristina García Rodero
- 1991 Robert Lebeck
- 1992/1993 Don McCullin
- 1994 Mary Ellen Mark
- 1995 Gilles Peress
- 1996 Regina Schmeken
- 1997 Peter Hunter (né Otto Salomon, son of Dr. Erich Salomon)
- 1998 René Burri
- 1999 Eva Besnyö
- 2000 Arno Fischer
- 2001 Herlinde Koelbl
- 2002 Reporters sans frontières
- 2003 John G. Morris
- 2004 Will McBride
- 2005 Horst Faas
- 2006 Martin Parr
- 2007 Letizia Battaglia
- 2008 Anders Petersen
- 2009 Sylvia Plachy
- 2010 Michael von Graffenried
- 2011 Heidi and Hans-Jürgen Koch
- 2012 Peter Bialobrzeski
- 2013 Paolo Pellegrin
- 2014 Gerd Ludwig
- 2015 Josef Koudelka
- 2016: Rolf Nobel
- 2017: Antanas Sutkus
- 2019: Stephanie Sinclair
- 2020: Chris Killip
- 2023: Rafał Milach
- 2024: Andrea Diefenbach
- 2025: Kathy Ryan
