= Gertrude Fehr =

German photographer (1895–1996)

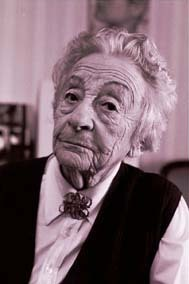
- Gertrude Fehr in 1989.
- Born: 5 March 1895; Mainz, Germany
- Died: 16 August 1996 (aged 101); Clarens, Free State, South Africa
- Citizenship: Germany, Swiss, French
- Occupation: Photographer
- Spouse: Jules Fehr

Gertrude Fehr (5 March 1895 – 16 August 1996) was a German photographer. She was born in Mainz on Tuesday 5 March 1895 and died in 1996 at the age of 101.

== Biography ==
Gertrude Fehr came from a prominent German Jewish family. In 1918, after an apprenticeship in the Munich studio of Eduard Wasow, Fehr opened her own studio, employing six people. In 1933, she was forced to flee Germany due to the political climate at the time. She fled with Jules Fehr, her future Swiss husband, to Paris. In 1934, the two of them opened the Publiphot school. In the end of the 1930s she and her husband moved to Switzerland where they opened a photography school in Lausanne. She proposed color photography in 1950. She died in 1996.

== See also ==
- List of German women photographers
