= Juliane Herrmann =

German photographer (born 1989)

- Born: April 28, 1989 (age 36); Jena, German Democratic Republic
- Education: AKV St. Joost, Dortmund University of Applied Sciences and Arts
- Known for: Photography
- Notable work: Man among Men
- Elected: FREELENS e.V. board member, Female Photoclub e.V. board member

Juliane Herrmann (born 1989) is a German photographer and curator based in Cologne, North Rhine-Westphalia. Herrmann's work is known for her visual research on Closed Communities such as Freemasonry, Scouting, and Studentenverbindung. In 2016, she initiated the photography magazine Beyond. In the last years she has been curating photography exhibitions as Facing Gender – f2 Fotofestival, in the Kulturort Depot, Dortmund, (2021) and Beyond III – [post]koloniale Gegenwart, in the Altes Pfandhaus, Köln (2021).

== Work on closed communities ==
Herrmann's visual research focuses on closed group identities. She works with the stereotypical image on those groups to create a deeper analysis by mean of humanistic documentary photography. She started working on German student fraternities known as Studentenverbindung, for example at Corps Saxonia Jena, one of the German Student Corps in Jena. Her most recognized work is "Man among Men" a visual approach to Freemasonry in an international context. It shows portraits of Freemasons, photographs of their lodges and rituals, including ordinary pictures of the daily life in the lodges and the regular activities of the Freemasons, documented during 5 years of research. Herrmann's work was published as a book in 2017 for the 300-year jubilee of modern Freemasonry, being controversial discussed within Freemasonry as it may have revealed many of its secrets. Nevertheless, as Herrmann's work was published by the magazine of the German national weekly newspaper Die Zeit in 2015, it was described by freimaurer-wiki.de, a website affiliated with the Freemason community, as a "clear up of outdated prejudices." Since 2018 she is working with Scout groups in Germany, following them in summer camps, assemblies, hikes and big events such as the 24th World Scout Jamboree. A selection of pictures of scouts from different countries was exhibit in the MOUNTAINVIEW Gallery of Kunstraum Fuhrwerkswaage in Cologne, in 2021.

== Female photographers rights ==
Besides her contribution to the photography of closed communities, Herrmann is a female photographers rights activist. Together with the photographers Laura Morgenstern, Melina Mörsdorf, Alexandra Lechner, Claudia Gödke and Claudia Masur and Angelika Zinzow, she was one of the founding members of the German female photographers association Female Photoclub in 2020. The club was originally initiated by Nora Tabel and Laura Morgenstern in Berlin in 2017. Thanks to the club, according to Herrmann "the women become bolder and more self-confident, and are exchanging and networking more with each other." Female Photoclub has as mission to increase the visibility of female photographers and to draw attention to grievances, shape public discourse, and cause perspectives of women photographers to be seen.

== See also ==
- List of German women artists
