= Kathy Ryan =

American photography writer and editor

Kathy Ryan was the Director of Photography for The New York Times Magazine. She worked at The New York Times Magazine for 39 years from 1987 until her retirement in 2024.

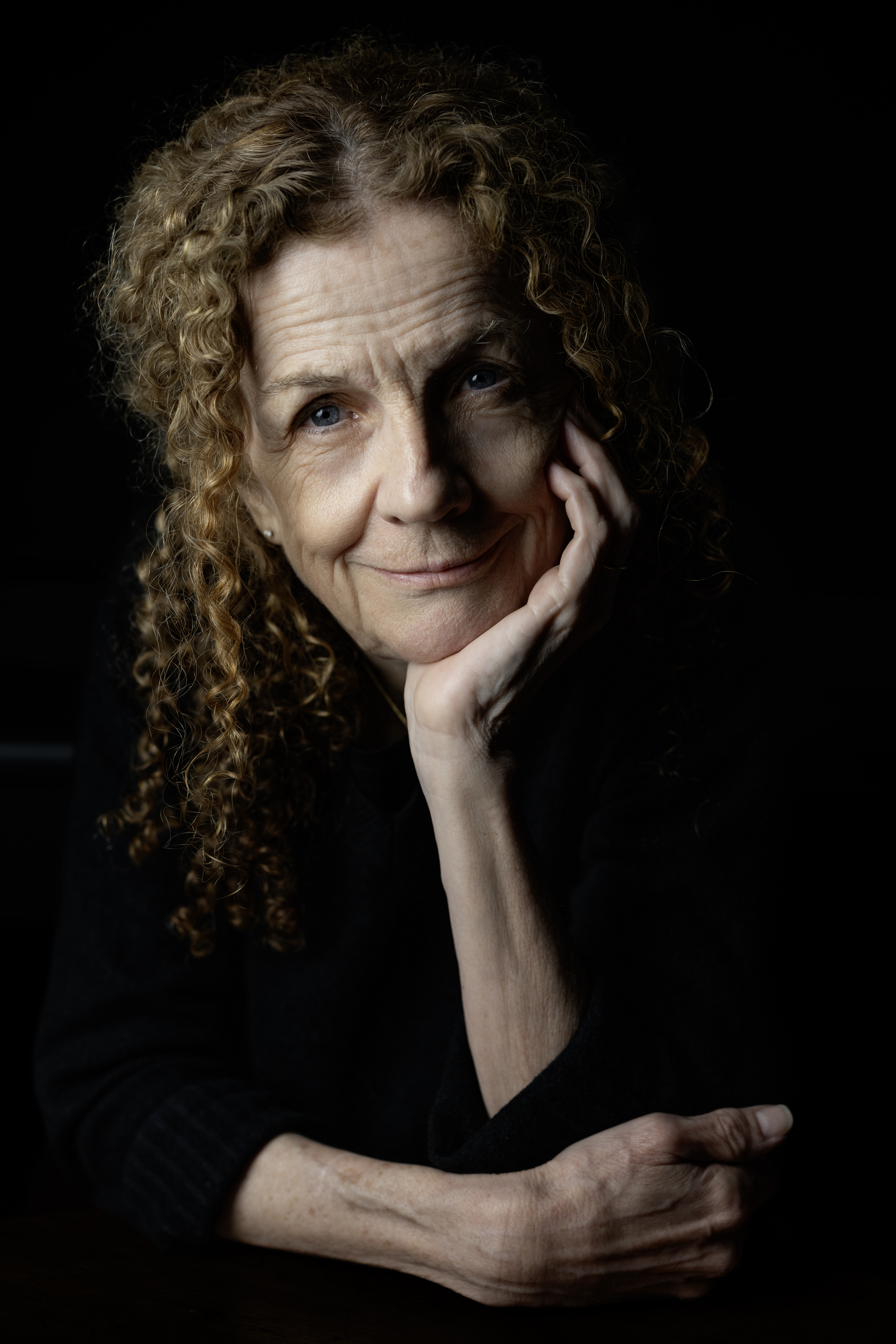

Ryan has published the photography book Office Romance, which began as a personal project where she published photographs of The New York Times Building on Instagram. This work revolves around the environment of The New York Times building and portraits of her colleagues and those close to her.

Under her leadership, the Magazine commissions photographers, a selection of whose work was published in The New York Times Magazine Photographs (Aperture, 2011), edited by Ryan. During her time there, the Magazine has been recognized with numerous photography awards, such as the National Magazine Awards in both 2011 and 2012. Ryan herself has received the Royal Photographic Society's annual award for Outstanding Service to Photography. Ryan also gives lectures on photography and serves as a mentor at the School of Visual Arts in New York City.

== Early life and education ==
Ryan was born in New Brunswick, New Jersey, as the second of six children. She lived in Manville, NJ for the first three years of her life and then moved to Bound Brook, NJ, where she lived until she went to college. She is a graduate of Bound Brook High School. Her life as an artist and lover of art began in third grade, when her teacher Sister Mary William had the class paste reproductions of famous works of art into black and white marbled notebooks.

Ryan studied art and art history at Douglass College, Rutgers University, where she concentrated on drawing and worked as a printmaker in the lithography studio, including printing an edition of photographs for Alice Neel.

== Career ==
=== Early years ===
In September 1978, Ryan was hired by Eliane Laffont, the director of Sygma Photo Agency, as a photo librarian. She then went on to work as a photo researcher, and eventually became the director of the photo research department.

=== The New York Times Magazine ===
In the spring of 1985, Ryan was hired by Peter Howe, the photo editor of The New York Times Magazine, to be the Deputy Photo Editor. She became the director of photography in 1987. Ryan has worked for over thirty years as the director of photography at The New York Times Magazine. She is known for discovering new talent for large commissions in addition to working with legendary, well-established photographers, as well as for cross-assigning photographers to cover topics outside of their usual subject matter. Ryan created the Great Performers video series which began in 2010 with "14 Actors Acting," directed by Sølve Sundsbø. The videos would go on to win two News and Documentary Emmys for "14 Actors Acting" and "Touch of Evil," directed by Alex Prager, along with several more nominations.

Some of the photo essays that The New York Times Magazine published under Ryan's photo direction include:

- "The Kuwaiti Inferno," by Sebastião Salgado (June 9, 1991)
- "James is A Girl," by Nan Goldin (February 4,1996)
- "A Special Photography Issue: Times Square" featuring photography by Chuck Close, Nan Goldin, Lyle Ashton Harris, Annie Leibovitz, Lars Tunbjörk, Mitch Epstein, Mary Ellen Mark, Richard Burbridge, and more (May 18, 1997)
- "Dream House," by Gregory Crewdson (November 10, 2002)
- "Freedom Row," by Taryn Simon (January 26, 2003)
- "The Strokes," by Ryan McGinley (August 8, 2004)
- "How Did Darfur Happen," by Paolo Pellegrin (October 17, 2004)
- "The Battle Company Is Out There," by Lynsey Addario (February 24, 2008)
- "The Young Women of the F.L.D.S.," by Stephanie Sinclair (July 27, 2008)
- "Obama's People," by Nadav Kander (January 18, 2009)
- "Great Performers," by Paolo Pellegrin (February 8, 2009)
- "The Shrine Down The Hall," by Ashley Gilbertson (March 21, 2010)
- "Here is London," featuring photography by Nadav Kander, Idris Khan, Chris Levine, Gareth McConnell, and Mark Neville (March 1, 2012)
- "Love City: 24 Hours of Romance, Lust, and Heartache in New York," featuring photography by Ryan McGinley and others (June 10, 2018)
- "The End of the Line," by LaToya Ruby Frazier (May 5, 2019)
- "Brothers, Sisters, Strangers," by Eli Baden-Lasar (June 30, 2019)

=== Curating ===
Ryan has curated photography festivals and museum shows across the world. Some of her shows include "Chisel" at the New York Photo Festival, "Dutch Seen" at the Museum of the City of New York, "Prune: Abstracting Reality" at FOAM Museum in Amsterdam, the 2011 & 2015 LOOK3 photography festivals in Charlottesville, VA (co-curated with Scott Thode), and the 2014 Cortona on the Move festival (co-curated with Thode).

Ryan also co-curated a traveling exhibition of photographs from The New York Times Magazine Photographs that opened at the 2011 Rencontres d'Arles in France, and traveled to Amsterdam, Barcelona, New York, Santiago, Jacksonville, and Chattanooga.

== Office Romance ==
Office Romance began with a series of photographs Ryan posted on Instagram and has become a photo book, with genres such as still life, portraiture, formal abstraction, and architecture. Ryan focuses on capturing the light in The New York Times building, designed by architect Renzo Piano, and its interactions with the day-to-day life of a weekly magazine. The work has been featured in numerous photo essays in international publications.

== Publications ==
- The New York Times Magazine Photographs. Editor. New York: Aperture, 2011. Photographs and text.
- Office Romance: Photographs from Inside the New York Times Building. New York: Aperture, 2014. ISBN 978-1-59711-304-5. With an introduction by Renzo Piano. Photographs and text.
- Dressing Up: Fashion Week NYC. In conversation with Lee Friedlander. Yale University Press, 2015.

== Awards ==
- 1997 Canon Picture Editor of the Year Award, Visa pour l'Image Photojournalism Festival
- 2003 Picture Editor of the Year Lucie Award, Lucie Foundation
- 2007 Lifetime Achievement Award, The Griffin Museum
- 2010 News and Documentary Emmy Award, The National Academy of Television Arts and Sciences
- 2011 News and Documentary Emmy Award, The National Academy of Television Arts and Sciences
- 2012 Outstanding Service to Photography Award, The Royal Photographic Society
- 2014 Vision Award, The Center for Photography at Woodstock
- 2015 Picture Editor of the Year Lucie Award, Lucie Foundation
- 2016 Outstanding Contribution to Photography, Creative Review
- 2019 Picture Editing Team of the Year Lucie Award, Lucie Foundation
- 2019 Photo Annual Publication of the Year Award, Photo District News
- 2025 Dr. Erich Salomon Award
