= Horacio Coppola =

Argentine photographer (1906–2012)

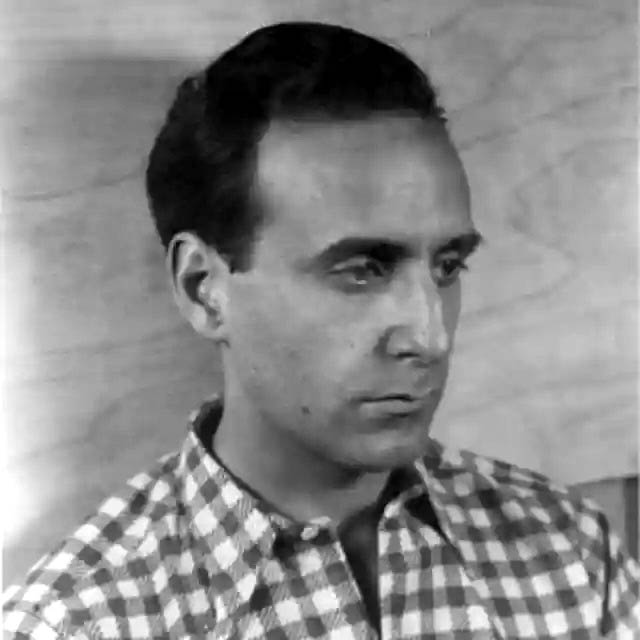
- Born: 31 July 1906
- Died: 18 June 2012 (aged 105)
- Occupation: Photographer
- Notable work: Photos of Buenos Aires

Horacio Coppola (31 July 1906 – 18 June 2012) was an Argentine photographer and filmmaker, and the husband of the German photographer Grete Stern.

== Biography ==
Coppola was born in Buenos Aires, the youngest of 10 children. His parents, Italian immigrants, were well off, and he studied art, music, law and languages. He was about 20 when he began taking photographs.

He traveled to Europe in the 1920s and ’30s. Photography was coming into its own as an art form, with pictures being shot from odd angles and cropped for effect.

He met his future wife in Germany. Later, in London, he took portraits of famous artists, and worked on a book about Mesopotamian artifacts in the Louvre and the British Museum. He and his wife went back to Argentina in 1936. That year, he was commissioned to photograph Buenos Aires for its 400th anniversary, and produced streetscapes that captured the romance, vitality and squalor of a great city.

He and Ms. Stern had a daughter, Silvia, and a son, Andres. They later divorced. In 1959, Coppola married Raquel Palomeque, a pianist.

Coppola was the author of the photographs that appeared in the first edition of "Evaristo Carriego" (biography) (1930) by Jorge Luis Borges. He was one of the pioneers photographers from Argentina and a key figure in Modernism. He studied in the Bauhaus during the thirties.

He was named "Illustrious Citizen of Buenos Aires" and at 100 had a retrospective exhibit at the Malba Museum in Buenos Aires.

== Gallery ==
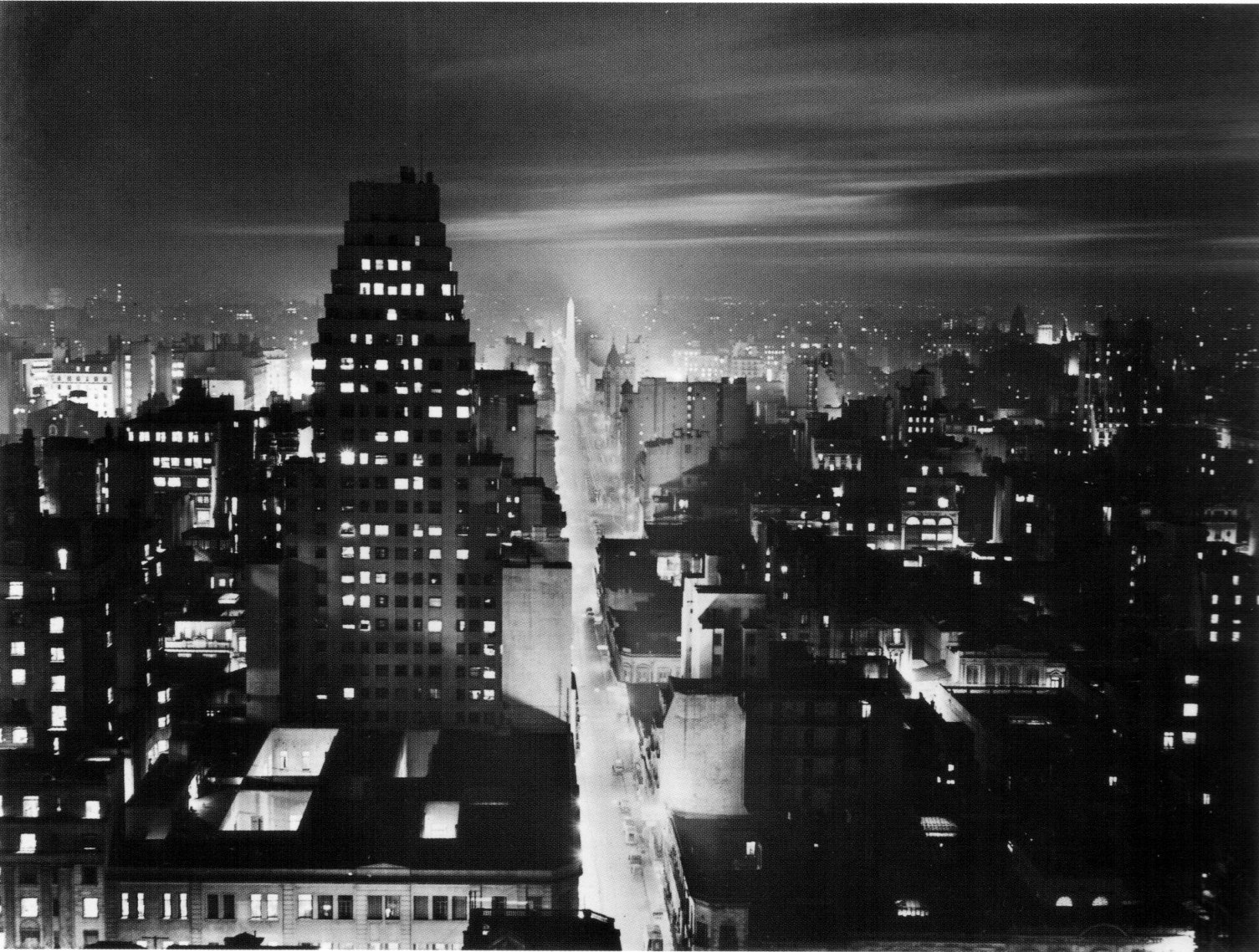
Nocturne Buenos Aires

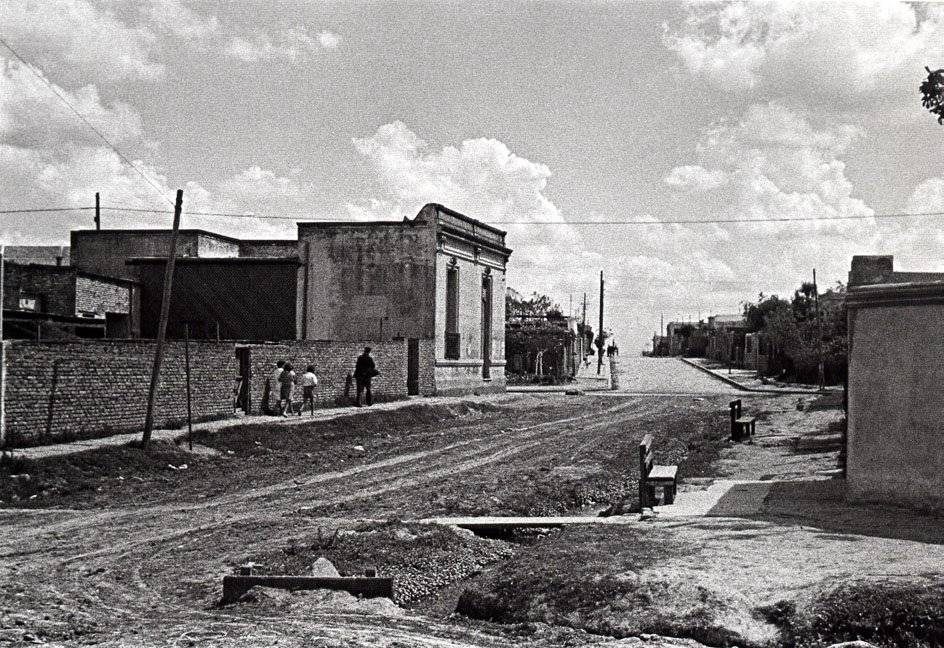
Correa street, BA

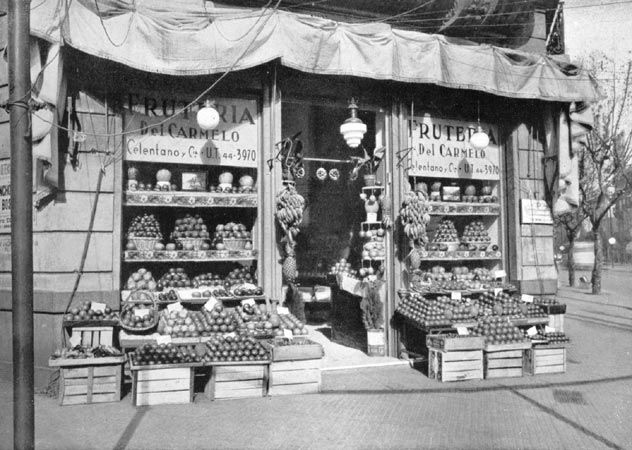
Fruit market

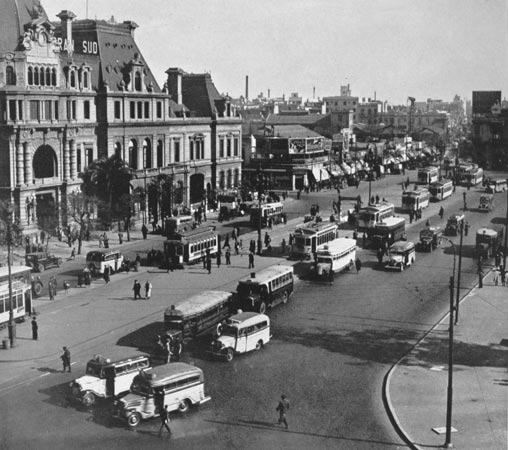
Plaza Constitución

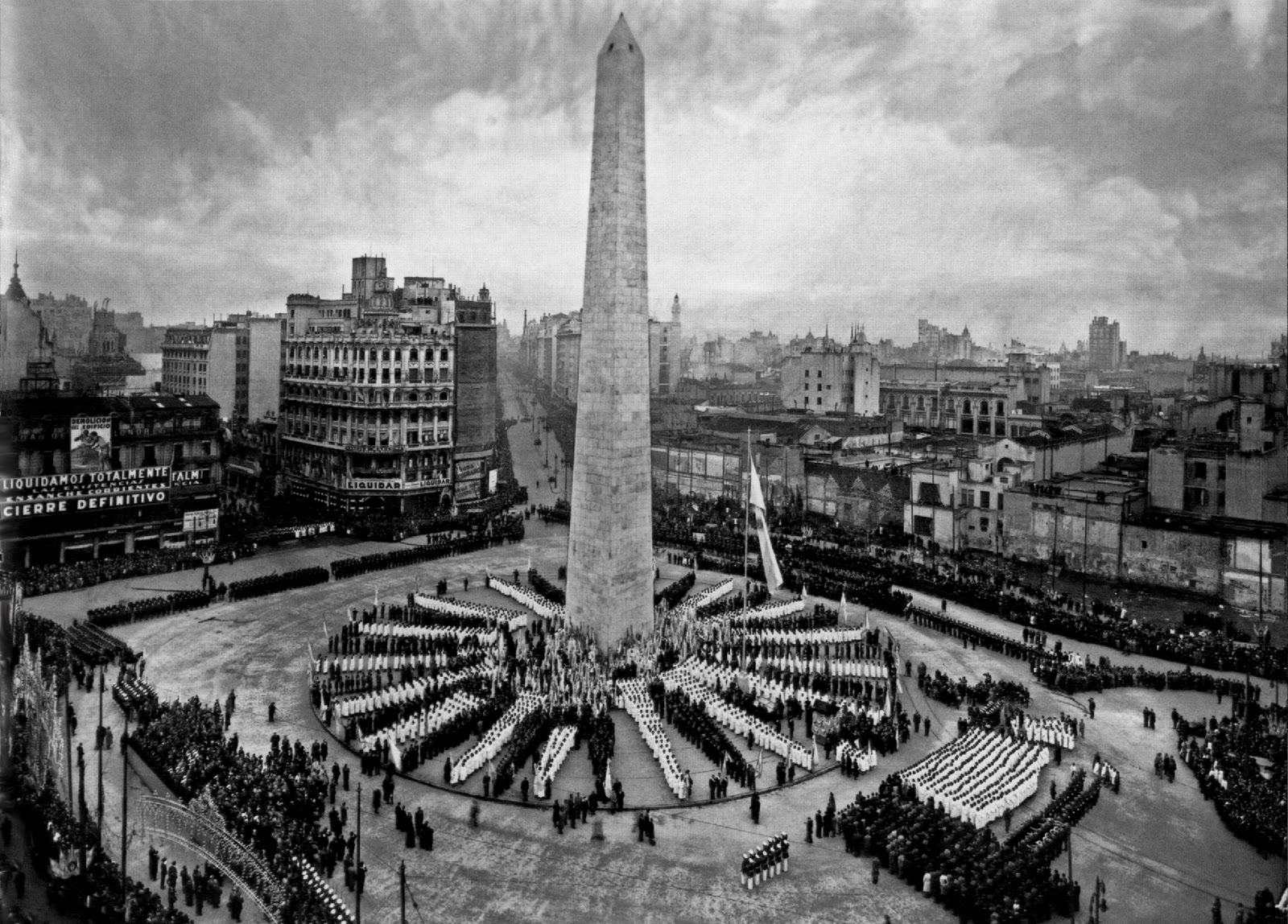
Plaza de la República

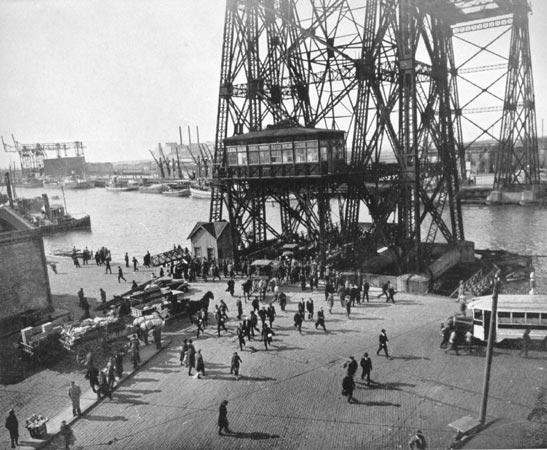
Transbordador Nicolás Avellaneda
