= Johanna Keimeyer =

German artist (born 1982)

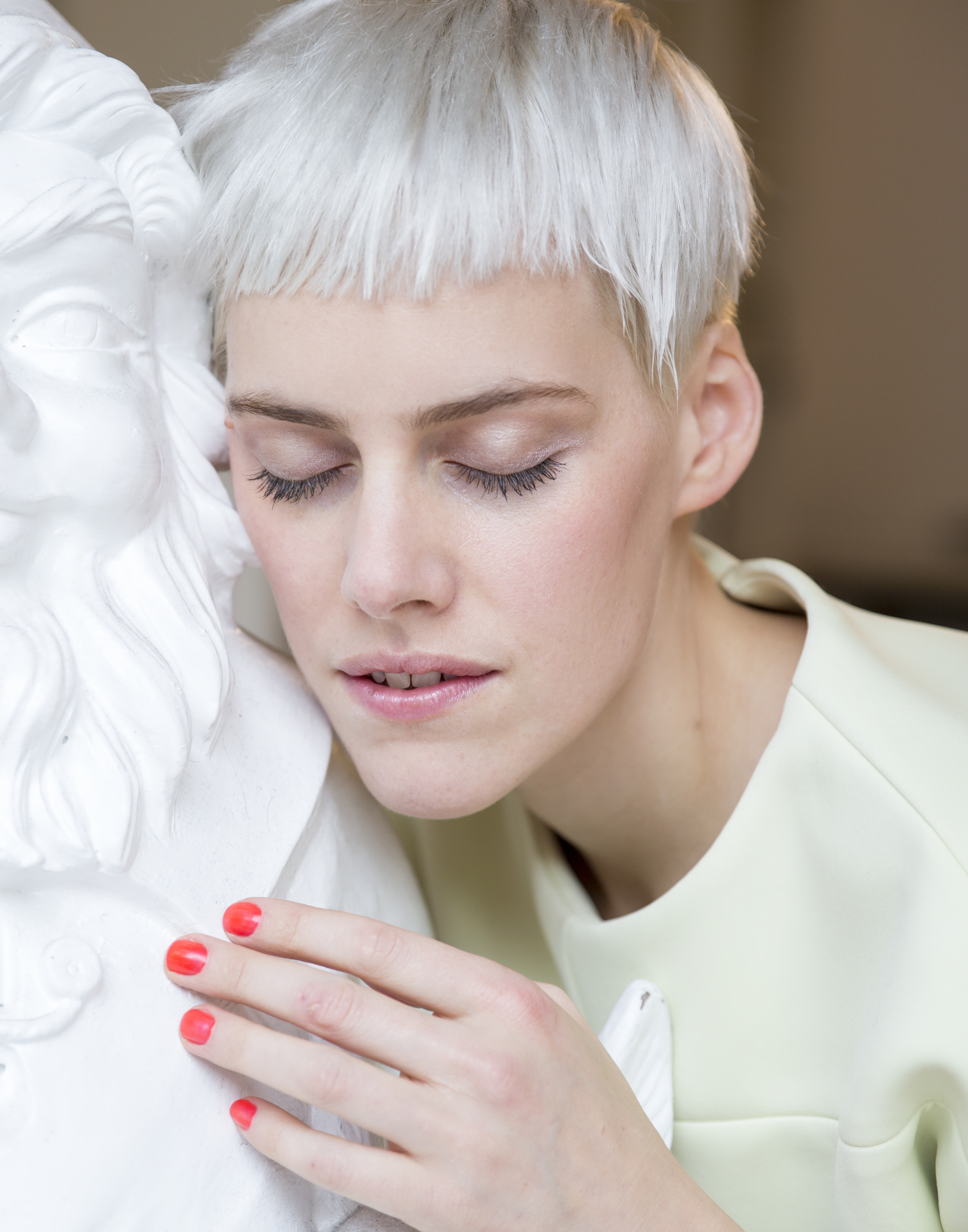
- Keimeyer in 2014
- Born: 1982 (age 42–43); Filderstadt, Baden-Württemberg, Germany
- Occupation: Artist

Johanna Keimeyer (born 1982) is a German artist known for her experiential work. She has designed lighting fixtures and experimented with various photography techniques. Her work often integrates technology with art, fashion, and design.

== Early life and education ==
Keimeyer was born in Filderstadt and raised in Ueberlingen on Lake Constance. After high school, she trained as a carpenter at the woodworking school of technology in Stuttgart-Feuerbach. She later studied upholstery with Vitra AG in Weil am Rhein, Germany, and Birsfelden, Switzerland.

She completed her education at Berlin University of the Arts, where she studied Product and Fashion Design, and at Tama Art University in Tokyo, where she studied Product Design. She also pursued studies in Digital Media at the Rhode Island School of Design and the MIT Media Lab in Boston, Massachusetts.

== Work ==
Between 2006 and 2011, Keimeyer designed lamps, focusing on light fixtures made from recycled materials gathered throughout Europe. During this time, she participated in a workshop led by Brazilian furniture designers Humberto and Fernando Campana.

In 2010, Alexander von Vegesack commissioned Keimeyer to design the lamp Trashure 2, which became part of his private collection. The lamp was featured in the exhibition Adventure with Objects at the Pinacoteca Giovanni e Marella Agnelli in Turin, Italy. The Italian television network RAI Uno covered the exhibition.

In 2022, Keimeyer was featured in the BBA Artist Prize 2022 in Kühlhaus, Berlin.

== Productions ==
In 2012, Keimeyer presented her master’s thesis, Everything is Illusion, at Berlin University of the Arts. From 2008 to 2013, she produced an underwater photography series titled Pool Around Me with the support of Martin Nicholas Kunz.

In 2016, Keimeyer organized a dance performance featuring five dancers and a light show for the reopening of Berlin’s Oderberger Stadtbad. Photographs from Pool Around Me were used to decorate the hotel rooms at Oderberger Stadtbad.

In 2017, Keimeyer developed a large immersive installation, Breathing Heart, featured in the official program of Art Basel.

Since 2020, Keimeyer has been a lecturer at the Berlin University of the Arts (HTW) and Berlin University of the Arts (UdK).

== Awards ==
- 2009 International Design Award (IDA), first rank, category: Student, Product Design, Lighting
- 2010 Faces of Design Award, (FoD), Best Online Portfolio
- 2018 International Design Award Architecture (IDA)

== Exhibitions (selection) ==
- 2008: participation on "Adventure with Objects“ in Pinacoteca Agnelli (Museum), Turin, Italy
- 2010: participation on "Kunstforum Brandenburg“, Potsdam, Germany
- 2011: participation on "Songs of the Sea“, National Glass Centre, Sunderland, UK
- 2011: participation on "Luminous Times – Sustainable Architecture“, France, in cooperation with Vitra Design Museum and the Centre Pompidou, Paris, France
- 2011: Audiovisuelle Installation, Bikini Showroom, Berlin, Germany
- 2011: participation on "DMY international design festival“, Berlin, Germany
- 2011: participation on "Young Design in Berlin“, Gallery Alte Schule, Berlin, Germany
- 2014: participation on "Festival of Lights NYC“, im Manhattan Bridge Anchorage, Dumbo, Brooklyn, USA
- 2015: participation on Gallery Weekend Berlin, Fotoausstellung im Kino International, Berlin, Germany

== Installations (selection) ==
- 2014 "Everything is illusion“ video-projection, Manhattan Bridge Anchorage, Brooklyn (USA)
- 2015 "Space, Motion and Community“ performance with Jonah Bokaer (USA) and Stavros Gasparatos (Greece), Boisbuchet, France
- 2016 "A New Dawn“ installation in the historic swimming hall, Hotel Oderberger, Berlin, Germany
- 2017 "BREATHingHEART“ installation, part of the official program of Art Basel, Basel, Switzerland

== Literature (selection) ==
- Alles ist erleuchtet, Sie macht aus Abfall Kunst, Johanna Keimeyer entwirft „Sustainable Design“, Welt-Kompakt, Nr. 252, 27. 12. 2010, p. 24 f.
- Ein Haus der Ideen bauen, in: Art Magazin, Nr. 2, February 2007, pp. 126 – 129.
- Johanna Keimeyer, „treat garbage like gold“, in: Ares Kalandides (Ed.), Berlin Design, Braun Publishing, Berlin 2009, p. 196 f. und p. 229. ISBN 978-3-03768-014-8
- Johanna Keimeyer, Recycle Lights, in: Henrietta Thompson (Ed.), Reinventa, la tua casa, Mailand 2013, p. 119. ISBN 978-88-370-9037-1
- New Glass Review 30, The Corning Museum of Glass (Ed.), New York 2009, p. 26. ISBN 978-0-87290-173-5
- On existential collecting, in: Adventures with objects, La collezione Alexander von Vegesack, Mailand 2008, p. II/13. ISBN 978-88-370-6086-2
- Joerg Suermann (Hrsg.),Weissensee Kunsthochschule Berlin (Design), copy culture, International Design Festival Berlin, Berlin 2011, p. 182 f. ISBN 978-3-9812813-5-4
