= Ursula Wolff Schneider =

German photographer and photojournalist

Ursula Flora Schneider (Wolff) (popularly known as Ursula Wolff Schneider) (August 14, 1906 – August 1977) was a German photographer and photojournalist. Her photographs of the pre-World War II period are a significant record of the society and culture of Weimar Germany, and they serve as an important example of early photojournalism.

== Biography ==
Ursula Wolff was born in Berlin, Germany, and is the daughter of the Sanskrit scholar Dr. Fritz Wolff and Minna Wolff (née Pfeffer). Her uncle was Fritz Pfeffer. She was married to German architect Karl Schneider.

In the mid-to-late 1920s, Ursula Wolff spent two years in Berlin, Vienna, and Hamburg working as an apprentice in photographers' studios and honing her talents. In 1928 – at the age of 22 – she established her own studio, Foto Wolff Lichtbildwerkstatt, and began working as a free-lance photographer.

She left Germany and emigrated to the United States in 1937. She spent her life in Chicago and was killed August 4, 1977 in an automobile accident.

== Career ==
She lived in Chicago, where she worked as a medical photographer at the Michael Reese Hospital from 1937 to 1942. Ursula Schneider was the Photographer of the Oriental Institute from 1942 until her retirement in 1973.

== Collections containing her work ==
Collections With Images by Ursula Wolff Schneider:

- Deutsches Archeological Institut, Rome, Italy
- Kunsthistorisches Institut in Florenz, Florenz, Italy
- Kunsthistorisches Institut, Marburg, Germany
- Altes Museum, Berlin, Germany
- National Gallerie, Berlin, Germany
- Kronprinzenpalais, Berlin, Germany
- Warburg Haus, Hamburg, Germany
- Warburg Institute, London, UK
- British Museum, London, UK
- University of London, UK
- Metropolitan Museum, New York, NY
- Museum of Fine Arts, Boston, MA
- William Hayes Fogg Art Museum, Cambridge, MA
- Harvard Art Museums, Cambridge, MA
- Columbia University, New York, NY
- University of Illinois, Champaign, IL
