= Genja Jonas =

German photographer (1895-1938)

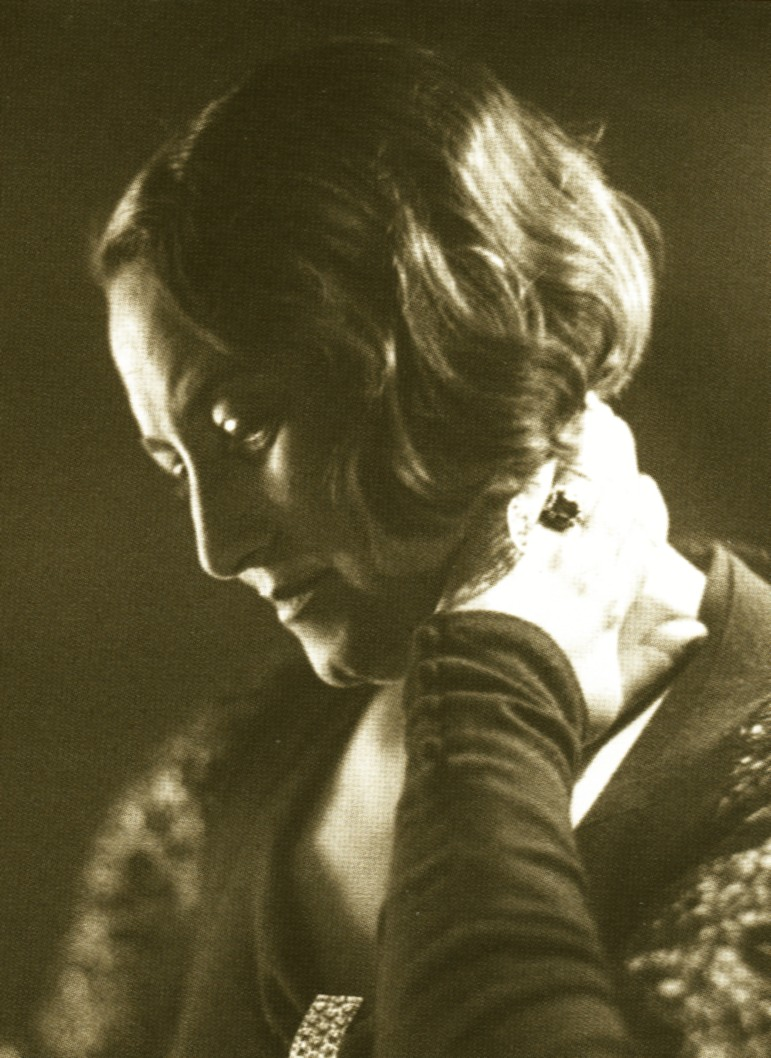
- Born: September 2, 1895; Rogoźno, Poland
- Died: May 8, 1938 (aged 42); Dresden, Germany
- Known for: Photography

Genja Jonas (1895-1938) was a German photographer known for her portraits

Jonas was born on September 2, 1895 in Rogoźno, Poland. She studied photography in Berlin and opened a successful portrait studio there in 1918. She married journalist Alfred Günther in 1925.

Jonas died on May 8, 1938 in Dresden, Germany. She and her husband were attempting to emigrate from Germany when she died from illness.
