= Hermann Wronker AG =

Store chain

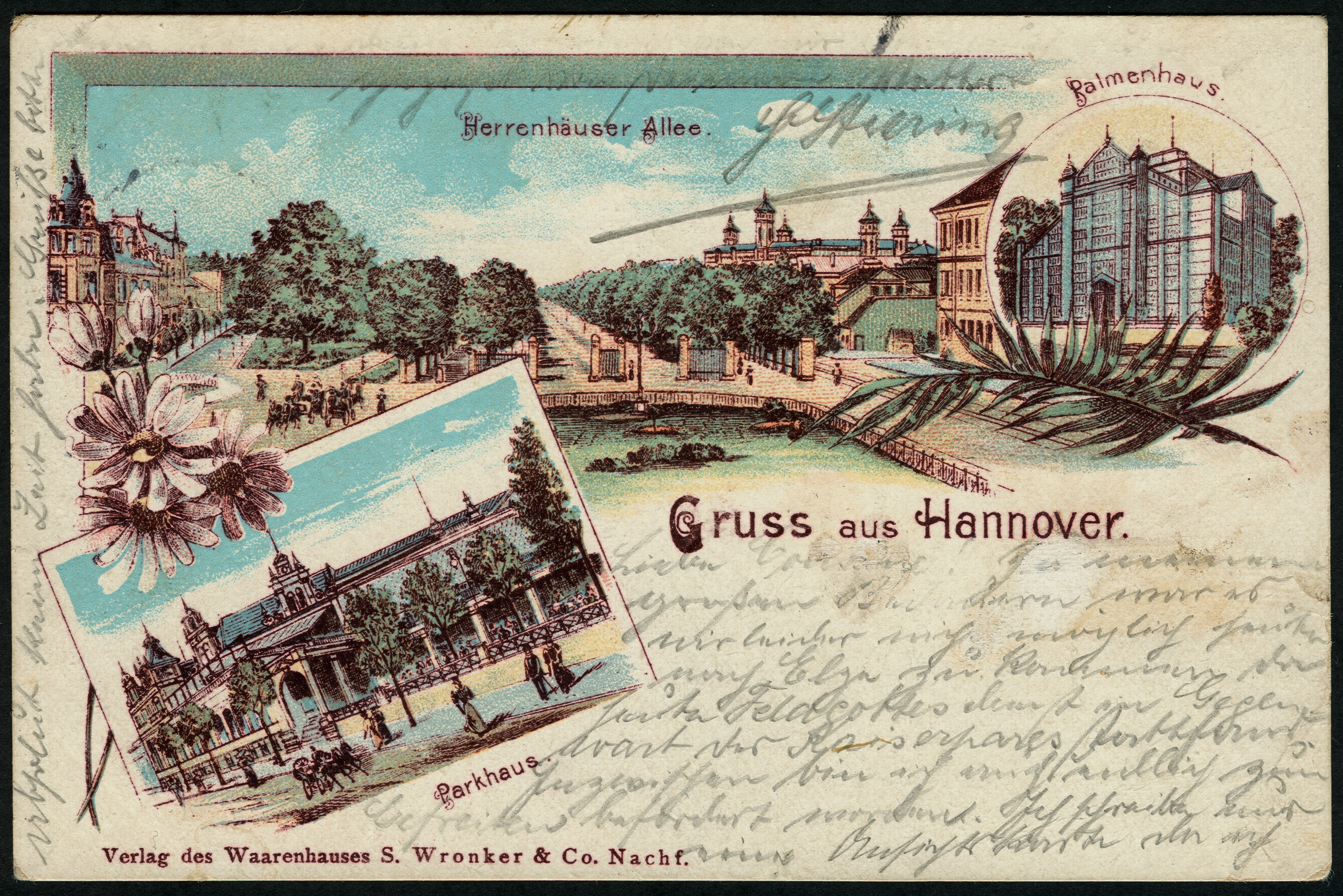
- Postcard from 1898 of Wronker warehouses
- Industry: Department stores
- Founded: 1887; 139 years ago in Mannheim, Germany as S. Wronker and Co.
- Founder: Herman Wronker
- Defunct: 1934
- Fate: Appropriated by Nazi regime
- Headquarters: Frankfurt, Germany

Hermann Wronker AG was a German department store chain. Its holdings included the largest department store in Frankfurt before World War II.

Company founder Hermann Wronker was born on 5 August 1867 in eastern Prussia. He started businesses at a young age, opening stores in Bamberg and Coburg, and in 1887 in Mannheim founded S. Wronker & Co. with his elder brother Simon. Hermann left Mannheim in 1891 to found a branch of the business in Frankfurt am Main. Branches later opened in Baden, Hessen, and Alsace. The Frankfurt site was expanded in 1896, but had to be rebuilt following a fire in 1897. In 1921, the business was incorporated as Hermann Wronker AG, which by the end of the decade had become one of the largest businesses in southern Germany after expanding to Nuremberg and within Frankfurt. Its flagship Frankfurt store was known as Kaufhaus Wronker.

In 1934 the company was "aryanized" and the Wronker family was forced to sell. While some members of the family emigrated out of Germany, Hermann Wronker was murdered in the Auschwitz concentration camp in 1942.
