= Ellen Auerbach =

American photographer

- Self-portrait of Ellen Auerbach in exile in Palestine, 1934/35
- Born: Ellen Rosenberg; May 20, 1906; Karlsruhe, Germany
- Died: July 30, 2004 (aged 98); New York City
- Known for: Photography
- Notable work: ringl+pit Studio

Ellen Auerbach (née Rosenberg; May 20, 1906 – July 30, 2004) was a German-born American photographer who is best remembered for her innovative artwork for the ringl+pit studio in Berlin during the Weimar Republic.

== Early life ==
Auerbach (born Ellen Rosenberg) was born May 20, 1906, in Karlsruhe, Germany. She was born to a liberal Jewish family, and was the daughter of Max Rosenberg and Melanie Gutmann. Her father was a successful businessman while her mother looked after the family.

Rosenberg took no interest in the family business, so her parents allowed her to study, but provided little financial support or encouragement. Between 1924 and 1927, Auerbach studied art at the Badische Landeskunstschule in Karlsruhe. Her professors were Paul Speck and Karl Hubbuch.

In 1928 she went to the Academy of Art (Am Weissenhof) in Stuttgart to continue her studies. Whilst at the academy she carved a bust of her uncle; he gave her a 9 x 12 cm camera to get "the angles right". This first experience led her to pursue photography as a way of earning a living.

=== Studying photography ===
In 1929 Rosenberg moved to Berlin to study photography with Walter Peterhans, who was a member of the Bauhaus design movement. Whilst studying under Peterhans, Rosenberg met Grete Stern, Peterhans' only other private student. Berlin's liberal environment allowed women to live free social and sexual lives, and Rosenberg was able to break away from her family's traditional expectations.

Rosenberg's studies with Peterhans were interrupted in 1930 when he moved to Dessau to become the Master of Photography at the Bauhaus School for art and design, but not before impressing on her that photography was an art form, a novel idea at the time. He also encouraged her to pursue photography throughout her life.

== Career ==
In 1930 Rosenberg and Stern bought Peterhans´ studio and equipment, and founded their own photography and design studio specialising in advertising, fashion and portrait photography. This was one of the world's first female-run photographic businesses. They named the studio after their childhood names, ringl+pit (pit for Rosenberg), which also advantageously disguised their genders Unusually, they signed all of their work together.

The pair were influenced by the creative environment in Berlin at the time. They portrayed women in unconventional ways, impacting the emerging image of the New Woman. Whilst Stern's specialty was in graphic design and the formal aspects of photography, Rosenberg provided the humorous and ironic touches to their representations of women in advertising and film.

At first they received few commissions. They photographed friends and lovers they met through bohemian circles, including the dancer Claire Eckstein and the poet Marieluise Fleisser. In 1931 ringl+pit's work received positive reviews in the magazine Gebrauchsgraphik and in 1933 they won first prize for one of their posters in Brussels. Walter Auerbach started to visit the studio regularly and occasionally lived there with the two women. In 1932 Rosenberg went to live in Walter's small attic apartment.

Rosenberg also experimented with film. She made two short black and white films. Heiterer Tag auf Rügen mixed elements of nature with images of friends from a visit to the island of Rugen. Gretchen hat Ausgang was a short silent drama, which featured Stern as a clumsy maid, and her future husband Horacio Coppola as a handsome man who tries to seduce her at the local ice-cream parlour.

When Hitler rose to power in 1933, Walter Auerbach, an activist in left wing political circles, warned them of the dangers ahead. At the end of 1933 Rosenberg left Germany for Palestine; as it was the only place she could go; a loan from Stern allowing her to enter as a "capitalist". Shortly after her arrival Rosenberg became the official photographer for the Women's International Zionist Organisation (WIZO), and made Tel Aviv, a 16 mm black and white film about the growing city. When Walter joined her in Palestine, they opened a children's photography studio called Ishon ("apple of my eye").

In 1936 the Abyssinian war broke out, and Walter Auerbach and Rosenberg left for London to visit Stern. Stern and Rosenberg collaborated once again in a few commissions, including one for a maternity hospital, their final work together. During her time in London Rosenberg made a short film of Brecht, reciting his poetry; however, the film was silent.

After Stern emigrated to Argentina in 1936, Rosenberg tried but failed to obtain a work and residency permit to run the London studio. In 1937 she married Walter Auerbach and the pair immigrated to the United States. They lived in Philadelphia, where she had some relatives, and continued to work as a children's photographer. In 1938 one of her child photographs was selected for the cover of Life Magazine's second anniversary issue. Here she also experimented with ultraviolet and infrared photography.

In 1940 Ellen and Walter Auerbach moved to New York, where she worked freelance for magazines, including Time, Life and Photo Technique. She also made record covers for Columbia Masterworks. The Auerbachs ended their marriage in 1945 although they remained friends.

Between 1946 and 1949 Ellen Auerbach worked with Dr. Sybil Escalona, a child psychologist, at the Menninger psychiatric institute in Kansas. There she photographed and made two films on young children's behaviour. In the early 1950s Auerbach taught photography at the Junior College for Arts and Crafts in Trenton, New Jersey.

In 1955 Auerbach joined nature photographer, Eliot Porter, on a trip to Mexico to photograph churches. Photographs were taken with natural light, which was unusual at this time. This work did not receive recognition at the time, but were published in two books many years later. This trip was her last professional photography project.

At the age of sixty Auerbach embarked on a new career, providing educational therapy for children with learning disabilities at the Educational Institute for Learning and Research in New York.

== Later life ==
Auerbach continued to create photographs non-commercially throughout her later life, as a creative outlet for her thoughts and impressions. She traveled extensively between the 1940s and 1960s, photographing landscapes and nature, as well as interiors, architecture, street scenes and portraits.

In 1990, at the age of 84, she lectured at the Art Institute and the Goethe Institute in Chicago about photographic technique and her life as a photographer.

Auerbach died July 30, 2004, in New York City.

== Rediscovery ==
In the 1980s the work of ringl+pit and Auerbach began to be exhibited by German museums. The rediscovery of her work was partly triggered by the publication of two photography books – Mexican Churches (1987) and Mexican Celebrations (1990) which were originally taken in 1955 with fellow photographer Eliot Porter.

Auerbach's hometown organized a show in 1988 called Emigriert, and the Folkwang Museum in Essen mounted a comprehensive ringl+pit exhibition in 1993. A retrospective of her work was presented at the Academy of Arts, Berlin in 1998.

In 1996, a documentary about her partnership with Grete Stern, Ringl + pit, won a number of awards. Very few of ringl+pit's photographs survive today; most those still in existence are held by museums and collectors.

== Family ==
Auerbach had an older brother who died when he was a child and a brother Walter who was 12 years younger. In 1936 Walter Rosenberg secured a visa for Argentina and sailed there to live with Stern, who was then married to Horacio Coppola.

During the war the Rosenbergs' parents stayed in Karlsruhe. In October 1940, they were deported by the Nazis to the Gurs concentration camp in France along with 6,500 Jews from the Baden-Württemberg region. They returned to Karlsruhe after the war.
