= Barbara Klemm =

German press photographer (born 1939)

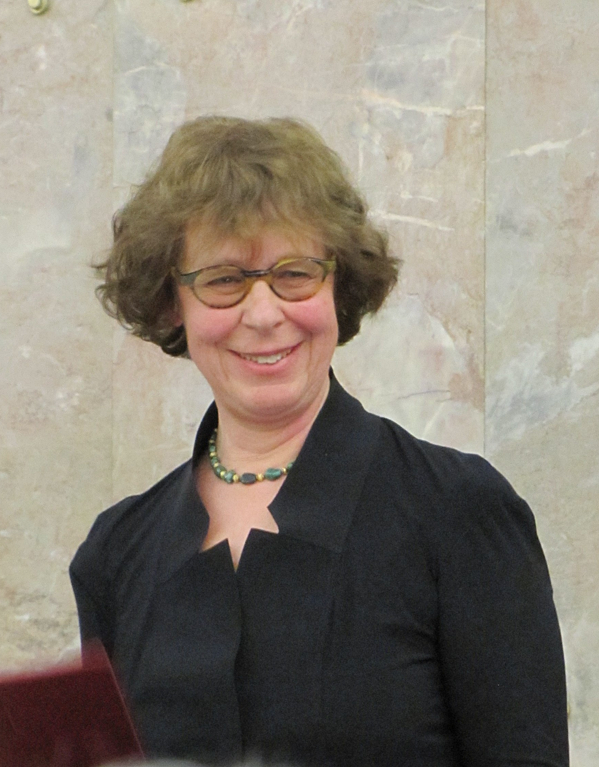
- Barbara Klemm in 2010
- Born: 27 December 1939 (age 86); Münster, Nazi Germany (now Germany)
- Occupation: Photographer
- Years active: 1959–2004

Barbara Klemm (born 27 December 1939 in Münster) is a German press photographer. She worked for Frankfurter Allgemeine Zeitung for 45 years. She photographed many of the most important events in recent German history and has received honors, including Fellowship of the Academy of Arts, Berlin and the Pour le Mérite. She was inducted into the Leica Hall of Fame in recognition of her status as "a driving force in reportage photography" and as "an exemplary photographer".

== Early life ==
She was born in Münster and grew up in Karlsruhe.

Her father Fritz Klemm was a painter and a professor at the Academy of Fine Arts, Karlsruhe.

== Career ==
In 1959, she moved to Frankfurt to work for the Frankfurter Allgemeine Zeitung (FAZ), for which she worked until 2004. As a press photographer she photographed events including the 1969 student riots in Frankfurt, Heinrich Böll protesting against nuclear weapons in 1983, the 1969 celebrations in Cuba for the tenth anniversary of the revolution, the first democratic elections held in Portugal on 25 April 1975, and the fall of the Berlin Wall in 1989.

She has photographed many celebrities, including Mick Jagger, Tom Waits, Claudio Abbado, Simon Rattle, György Ligeti, Andy Warhol, and Rainer Werner Fassbinder. Her famous photographs include Soviet general secretary Leonid Brezhnev kissing East German leader Erich Honecker in 1979. Throughout her life she has consistently used black-and-white analog (film) photography, typically single photographs rather than series.

== Exhibitions ==
- Barbara Klemm. Photographs 1968 – 2013, Martin-Gropius-Bau, Berlin, 2013–2014
- "Barbara Klemm. Light and Dark.", Państwowa Galeria Sztuki, Sopot, 5 Sept 2025-12 Oct 2025.

== Awards ==
She is a Fellow of the Academy of Arts, Berlin and an honorary professor at Darmstadt University of Applied Sciences. She received the Dr. Erich Salomon Prize in 1989, the Pour le Mérite for Sciences and Arts in 2010, the Leica Hall of Fame award in 2012 as well as the International Folkwang-Prize in 2021.
