= Andrea Diefenbach =

German photographer (born 1974)

- Born: 1974 (age 51–52); Wiesbaden, Germany
- Education: Bielefeld University of Applied Sciences and Arts
- Occupation: Documentary photographer
- Awards: Dr. Erich Salomon Award (2024)
- Website: www.andreadiefenbach.com

Andrea Diefenbach (born 1974) is a German documentary photographer. She has made work about people in Ukraine and Moldova. In 2024, Diefenbach received the Dr. Erich Salomon Award from the German Society for Photography.

== Early life and education ==
Diefenbach was born in Wiesbaden. She graduated from Bielefeld University of Applied Sciences and Arts in 2006.

== Work ==
Her photobook Aids in Odessa (2008) is about the HIV/AIDS epidemic in Odessa, Ukraine. It was described in Dazed as containing "intimate moments of solitude, despair and hope". It includes a short introduction by each subject about how they contracted HIV. For the photobook Land ohne Eltern (land without parents, 2012), for nearly a decade, Diefenbach followed the lives of Moldovan labor migrants in Italy and their families, particularly children, who remained in Moldova. Realitatea (Reality, 2022) combines more photographs from Moldova—a country grappling with an identity crisis since gaining independence 30 years ago—with facsimiles of Moldovan newspapers and texts relating to political events of the previous ten years.

== Personal life ==
Diefenbach is based in Wiesbaden.

== Publications ==
=== Publications by Diefenbach ===
- СПИД [spid] AIDS in Odessa. Berlin: Hatje Cantz, 2008. With an introduction by Boris Mikhailov.
- Land ohne Eltern = land without parents. Heidelberg: Kehrer, 2012. With essays by Nicola Abé, Dumitru Crudu, and Grigore Vieru. ISBN 978-3-86828-337-2. In English and German.
  - Second edition. Heidelberg: Kehrer, 2016. ISBN 978-3868287516.
- Realitatea. Stuttgart: Hartmann. 2022. With essays by Martin Sieg and Andrei Avram, and an interview with Diefenbach by Pavel Brăila, Ovidio Tichindeleanu, Olga Ghilca and Nora Dorogan. ISBN 978-3-96070-085-2. In English.

=== Publications with contributions by Diefenbach ===
- The Catalogue Box. Dortmund: Kettler; Cologne: The PhotoBook Museum, 2014. Edited by Markus Schaden and Frederic Lezmi. German and English text. ISBN 978-3-86206-394-9. Box with individual publications (also available separately) each by Ali Taptik, Anders Petersen, Diefenbach, Carlos Spottorno, Carolyn Drake, Chargesheimer, Cristina de Middel, Daidō Moriyama, David Alan Harvey, Dominique Darbois, Ed Templeton, Hans-Jürgen Raabe, Jiang Jian, Julian Germain, Marks of Honour, Oliver Sieber, Martin Parr and Gerry Badger, Ricardo Cases, Stephen Gill, Susan Meiselas, and Todd Hido. Published on the occasion of the inauguration of the PhotoBook Museum.

== Awards ==
- 2024: Dr. Erich Salomon Award, German Society for Photography

== Solo exhibitions ==
- Land ohne Eltern, Münchner Stadtmuseum, Munich, June–July 2013
