= Hanni Schwarz =

German woman photographer

Hanni Schwarz (1875–1935) was a German nude and portrait photographer, who worked in Berlin from around 1901. She is considered a well-known professional photographer in the German Empire at the beginning of the twentieth century.

== Life ==
Schwarz's life dates are unknown. Before turning to photography, she was a teacher at her father's school in Basel. Around 1904, she took over the photo studio of Johannes Hülsen in Berlin together with Anna Walter. Around 1909, she ran her photo studio together with Marie Luise Schmidt. For 27 May 1919, it is registered as Atelier Hanni Schwarz in the Dorotheenstraße and specialised in portrait and dance photography.

From its foundation in 1903, the magazine Die Schönheit published photographs of her. The Ross-Verlag in Berlin, which was a leader in Europe in the 1920s and 1930s for postcards of famous film actors as well as with film scenes, published numerous portraits taken by her. A portrait Hanni Schwarz had made of the artist Fidus appeared in a book edited by Adalbert Luntowski in 1910. In the magazine Sport im Bild No. 5, 5 March 1926 a photograph of her was printed with the caption: Frau Chicky Sparkuhl-Fichelscher, our popular fashion illustrator, in her self-designed carnival costume of green silk and silver sequins. Ball des Deutschen Theaters.

In April 1908, a so-called beauty evening took place in the "Mozartsaal" of the Neues Schauspielhaus, at which nude photographs by Hanni Schwarz and Wilhelm von Gloeden were presented, projected onto a screen. By this time, Schwarz had already made a name for herself as fine-art photography. In 1910 she participated in the Brussels International 1910 with nude photographs. Colour photographs of her were shown at the "Bugra" in 1914.

It is said that a portrait photo of her contemporary Theodor Heuss with his wife, which was planned in 1912, failed because Schwarz forgot to change the photographic plate and a double exposure with Dr. Milch occurred.

The most recent photographs attributable to her date from 1930, after which she no longer appears. In 2000, works by Hanni Schwarz were included in the exhibition Le siècle du corps. Photographies 1900-2000 at the Musée de l'Elysée in Lausanne.

== Publications ==
- Hanni Schwarz: Photographie als Frauenberuf. In Photographische Mitteilungen, 42. Jg. (1905), issue 11, pp. 163–165; issue 12, pp. 182–184. (Online im Internet Archive)
- Hanni Schwarz: Der Werdegang der Photographin. In Photographische Chronik, No. 46, 14. June 1911.
