= Marie Goslich =

German photographer, editor (1859–1938)

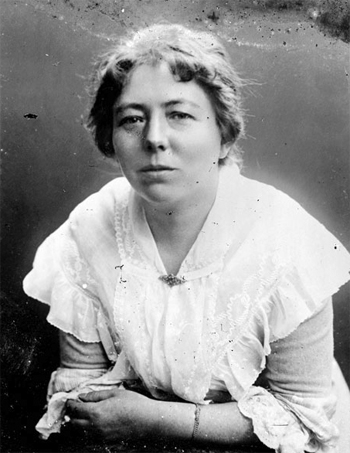
Marie Goslich

Marie Eva Elwine Goslich (24 February 1859 in Frankfurt (Oder) – 1936) was a German journalist, photographer and magazine editor. She is listed in the Berlin Residents Directory as "Writer and Editor" from 1902 to 1908 in Berlin W 57, Kurfürstenstraße 18, in 1909 she lived in Bülowstraße 59 and in 1910 in Berlin W 62 in Massenstraße 35. During the years 1907 to 1910, she was editor of the journal Körperkultur (Body Culture). In Potsdam, she became a member of the editorial board for the journal Bote für die christliche Frauenwelt (Messenger for Christian Women), published in the Foundation Publishing House by Pastor Theodor Hoppe (1846–1934), the founder of the Oberlinhauses. She also published in Die Mark (The Mark), an illustrated journal for tourism and local history. From 1916 to 1920, she was the responsible script manager for the Bote für die deutsche Frauenwelt (Messenger for German Women), as the Bote für die christliche Frauenwelt has been named since 1913.

== Life ==
Marie Goslich was the daughter of Friedrich Julius Goslich (18 October 1807, Berlin – 6 May 1875, Frankfurt (Oder)), Court of Appeal Councillor at the Court of Appeal in Frankfurt (Oder) up to 1875. Her mother was Marie Rosalie Elwine Hesse (6 June 1821, Spandau, Berlin – 7 August 1865, Frankfurt (Oder)). Marie Goslich was the youngest of four children. Her sister Elsbeth Valesca Goslich (24 February 1855 – 4 August 1923) was a teacher in Berlin, living in Karlshorst, Dönhoffstraße 1 in 1901, and Schöneberg, Akazienstraße 5 in 1907.

Marie was educated in the awareness of social responsibility at a very early age. In a Letter to the Editor of Bodenreform (Land Reform) (Publisher Adolf Damaschke from 1914), she recalls one incident from the 1870s: … The day before my father had heard about the invitation to the birthday party. "Where is the party?" he asked. – "At P. vom Wilhelmsplatz? – But that's out of the question….. that man buys properties, just to resell them, it is pure land dealing. My daughter shall not enter such a house".

From 1865 to 1875 Marie Goslich attended the State Höhere Töchterschule in Frankfurt (Oder). After the early bereavement of her parents she lived with her sister, Elsbeth Valesca, in the house of their guardian, the royal Prussian Secret Justice Councillor, Rudolf Tirpitz (1811-1905), the father of Alfred von Tirpitz and a student friend of Marie's father. In 1877 she went to live with friends of the family to the Hertwigswaldau Manor in Schlesien, to learn housekeeping. At a Boarding School in Dresden she was educated in languages, music and tailoring. In 1882 she spent a year in the French-speaking region of Switzerland to improve her knowledge of French.

Marie Goslich worked as a governess and private French teacher in Berlin. She lived in the so-called "Republic Lützow-Ufer", with Laura Delbrück, mother of the Publisher of the Prussian almanac, the historian Hans Delbrück, and with Helene und Irene von Henning. From 1891 to 1898 she worked as a secretary at the Editorial Department of the Publishers of the Prussian Almanacs. After leaving this job, she took up teaching again and taught the daughter of the Head Groom of Stables, Graf von Wedel. However, she never completely gave up her writing and journalist activities, as demonstrated by her contributions to the Berlin Daily Papers such as the Vossischen Zeitung and other illustrated journals as well as the Bote für die christliche Frauenwelt (Messenger for Christian Women). On 16. February 1910 she married the author Karl Kuhls, born on 4 February 1862 in Wewern, Kreis Lasdohn/Livland, son of the teacher Karl Kuhls, Director of the School in Riga and Königsberg and his wife Emma, née Fröhlich from Memel. From this time on she published her contributions mainly under the name Marie Kuhls or Marie Kuhls-Goslich.

In 1911 the Kuhls-Goslich couple moved to Potsdam to the Bismarckstraße 9, and in 1912 to the Albrechtstraße 3. After a divorce from Karl Kuhls, whose illegitimate son Hans Kuhls (born 11 March 1915) she adopted, her address from July 1918 was Potsdamerstraße 84a, Berlin, and later Alten Königstr.1. At the end of the 1920s she moved to Geltow, living first with the Hermann family at their Guesthouse Baumgartenbrück and then at the house of the Rottstock family in the Havelstraße 4. In the Geltow Address Register she is last named in 1936/1937 as Marie Kuhls, author.

== Photography ==
After Marie Goslich's death, 410 glass negatives (Format 13X18) were kept by Mrs. Herrmann. Due to long storage and general circumstances, the glass negatives were in very bad condition. They have meanwhile, however, been scanned with a film scanner allowing for formats up to 20X30 cm. Following scanning the negatives were packed in acid-free paper and are now stored in safe and stable boxes. An exhibition on the Life and Works of Marie Goslich is currently being organised.

Goslich's photographic and journalistic work provides us with a picture of everyday culture in the early twentieth century, which is unusual for a woman particularly from her social class. Many of her older photos were clearly taken to illustrate reports on social and societal situations. In her articles she resists the destruction of the old infrastructure in cities, comments on land reform and photographed in this context Berlin's inner courtyards and lanes and streets with their small markian houses. In addition, scenes from building demolishing or the step by step reconstruction of older houses are found on the glass negatives. And the boats, warehouses, bridges, the people working in the ports show how Berlin was built from barges. Photographs of children playing or doing craftwork illustrate articles that try to escape from the unpleasantness of the tenement blocks. Photography on social themes during the First World War shows the work of the Berlin "Frauen Hilfe" (Women's Aid) and for example the construction of hay box cooker.

=== Genre photographs ===
Goslich directed special attention to the topic of "women" and their work in the field, garden and yard. Working fishermen and their families, anglers and recreational athletes were also photographed in action. The pictures demonstrated the natural characteristics of human beings in relation to their sequences of motion. Goslich's concept – the "holding" of the object in a natural landscape – has the effect that the photos of beggars, wanderers on the roadside, or the humble street vendors do not possess the drama expected by the viewer. They are simply a component part of society, a matter of course of their time.

=== Landscapes ===
Her landscapes are scenes from the Mark Brandenburg, showing much water and forests framing sandy pathways, sailing boats and beaches overcrowded with townsfolk. Comprehensive photo material illustrates the demolishing of the old and the construction of the new Baumgartenbrück (Schwielowsee) or shows events in and around the Guesthouse Baumgartenbrück. Some photographs show gardens in Berlin, and the surroundings areas of Schwielowsee, Potsdam, Werder, Dahme an der Dahme, Küstrin and Lübbenau.

=== Drawings ===
During the war years Marie Goslich designed and drew dresses and suits which clearly demonstrated the change in fashion during the years 1912 to 1920. These were published in the inserts "Für die Arbeitsstube" (For the Work Parlour) and "Kleidung und Wäsche" (Clothes and Linen) of the Bote für die christliche Frauenwelt (later Bote für die deutsche Frauenwelt). A drawing of the entrance to Petzow Castle can be seen in Der Mark and she illustrated the essay "Der Eislauf" (Ice-skating) with zestful ice skaters.

== Journalism ==
Her publications can be found under Marie Goslich (M.G.) and also under the name Marie Kuhls (M.K.) or Marie Kuhls-Goslich in:

- Preußische Jahrbücher. Verlag von Georg Stilke, Berlin 1898, 1899
- Nationalzeitung:Sonntagsbeilage, Aktiengesellschaft Berlin 1902
- Die Zeit, Verlag der Hilfe, Berlin Schöneberg, 1903
- Zeitschrift für Transportwesen und Straßenbau, Berlin 1903
- Theaterverlag Eduard Bloch, Berlin 1906
- Zeitschrift für Krankenpflege, R. Kobert/H. Cramer, Fischers medizinische Buchhandlung, Berlin 1906
- Zeitschrift für die Binnenschiffahrt, Paetel, Berlin 1906
- Die Woche, A. Scherl Verlag, Berlin 1907
- Vossische Zeitung. Königlich privilegierte Berlinische Zeitung von Staats- und gelehrten Sachen. Im Verlage Vossischer Erben, 1912
- Körperkultur. Illustrierte Monatsschrift für körperliche Vervollkommnung. Verlagsgesellschaft Corania m.b.H., Berlin 1908, 1909, 1910
- Der Bote für die christliche Frauenwelt. Stiftungsverlag Oberlinhaus, Potsdam 1905,
- Der Bote für die deutsche Frauenwelt. Stiftungsverlag Oberlinhaus, Potsdam 1915, 1916, 1917, 1918, 1919, 1920
- Die Mark. Illustrierte Wochenschrift für Touristik und Heimatkunde. Alexius Kießling, Buch und Landkarten Verlag, Berlin 1907, 1907/08, 1908/09, 1913, 1914, 1927

=== Important journalistic contributions ===
In the Preußische Jahrbücher (Prussian Almanac) 1899 she published "Letters from Johanna Kinkel", the composer and music teacher and the first wife of the poet Gottfried Kinkel. Thanks to these publications the personal experience of Johanna Kinkel with the societal consequences of the revolutionary years around 1848 could be handed down. Her earliest report was a three-part, richly illustrated on the Spreewald, written for the journal Bote für die christliche Frauenwelt in 1905. Evidence of her critical style can be found in her article "Tuskulum und Assessorenfabri", which she published in the Vossischen Newspaper in 1912. In this contribution she emphasised the intellectual happenings in Geltow – the influence of Baron Hartwig von Meusebach (1781-1847). Moreover, she criticised a report by Theodor Fontane, in which he had discredited the "Assessorenfabrik of Baumgartenbrück". In an article "Grazie" (Grace) (in Körperkultur, 1910) she wrote about Grace and Charm. In "Vanity Fair" (in Körperkultur, 1910) she compared the "elegant lady" with the misery of house workers. Remarkable are her negative comments with respect to land reform and property dealing, which was leading to dramatic changes in city infrastructure. These are cited from "Heimatschutz und Bodenreform" (in Die Mark 1914), "Industrie am Havelufer" (in Die Mark, 1907) and "Was kann der Hauswirt für die Körperkultur seiner Mieter tun?" (in Körperkultur, 1910). She also championed environmental protection in "Ein Kampf um die Erhaltung unserer Seen" (A fight for the Preservation of our Lakes) in Die Mark / Die Natur in der Mark, 1913.

In further publications, published by Goslich in the journal Körperkultur, she referred to the importance of sport as compensation for unhealthy city life. Her articles were often illustrated with smug scenes of townsfolk doing sport. During the First World War her style of writing became more patriotic and increasingly communicated the will to hold out for the many women left on their own. To date only one article from this era after the First World War is known.
