= Closed community =

Type of community

A closed community intentionally limits links with outsiders and outside communities. Closed communities may be of a religious, ethnic, or political nature. Governance of closed societies varies. Typically, members of closed communities are either born into the community or are accepted into it. The opposite of a closed community is an open community, which maintains social relations with external communities.

== Development ==
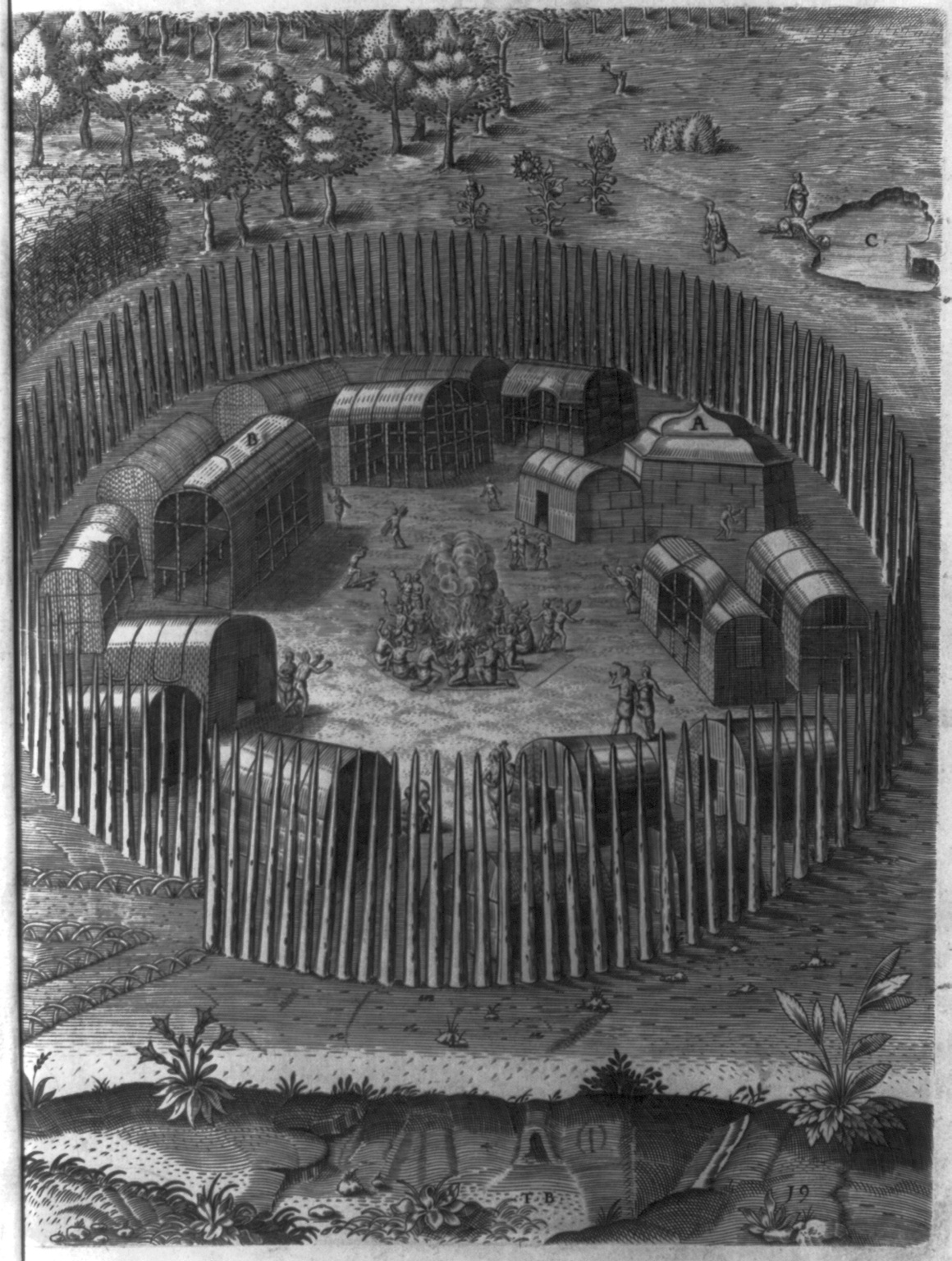
1590 drawing of an Indian village in the future United States, with buildings and stockade

The American ecologist Frederic Clements, who studied vegetation formation and development, developed the idea of plants experiencing birth, growth/maturation, and decay, similar to that of mankind. Clements also tested a theory known as "climax community", using areas of vegetation in comparison to actual communities. The community (fauna or human) is always constant and thriving; even in the event of a catastrophe, an individual or small group can survive and regrow or rebuild in the same area they originated or relocate elsewhere and succeed. The concept of many plants and animals coexisting together, having an ecosystem and building upwards was the theory he aimed for (example: rain forest). The general theory later failed due to the fact that there was little or extremely basic comparable information about the logic of a being, the concept worked more in favor towards smaller organisms. Also, the theory became outdated and later on replaced with new sociological facts or science theories.

=== Pros ===
- Security of residing in a controlled/supervised area
- Easier to find common interest, idea development with someone in your community
- Being able to finish work more efficiently, naturally, and more originally due to having no interference with exterior

=== Cons ===
- Limitation and "cut-off" of diversity which leads to more difficulty accepting or incorporating outside concepts
- Constantly having the same people in a closed area within a large communities of 50 or more can cause a resident to feel overwhelmed with an urge to escape
- The fear of being overpowered or intimidation/competition
- Can close themselves so off from advancements that have a hard time reintegrating into society

In a 1957 article published in the Southwestern Journal of Anthropology, archaeologist Eric R. Wolf argued that the organization of subsistence farmers into "closed, corporate communities" is a recurrent feature "in two world areas, widely separated by past history and geographical space: Mesoamerica and Central Java."

== Medicine in closed communities ==
Infectious disease presents particular challenges to closed communities; external action (from the government or outside medical personnel) may assist in stopping the spread of the disease.

== Religious and cultural communities ==
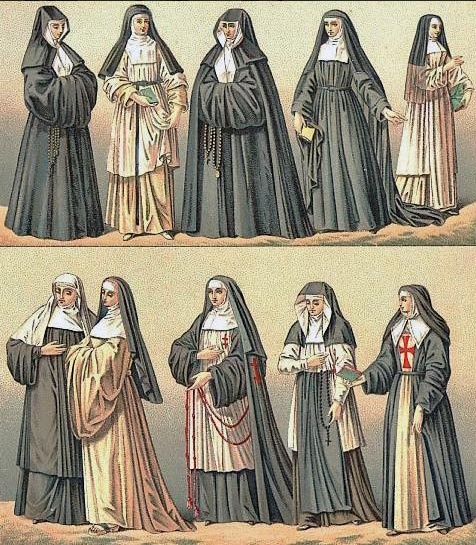
16th-century nuns

Some religious or ethnoreligious communities are considered closed. For example:

- The Amish are a closed community who intentionally set themselves apart from the modern world.
- Since the 11th century, the Druze have been a closed community.

== Closed countries ==
=== Examples of closed countries ===
- Japan (formerly) – under the Sakoku policy of the Edo period, Japan secluded itself from Western influences, controlling contact.
- North Korea – see also North Korean defectors. Often regarded as the world's most secretive state.
- Soviet Union – Soviet diplomat Anatoly Dobrynin wrote in his memoirs: "In the closed society of the Soviet Union, the Kremlin was afraid of emigration in general (irrespective of nationality or religion)" for fear of causing domestic instability.
  - See also Refusenik
  - "closed cities" – secretive, specially controlled zones that contained nuclear reactors, uranium mining, processing, and production, and other sensitive facilities continue to exist in Russia today.
- Burma (Myanmar) – formerly a closed society and international pariah, Burma underwent political reforms beginning in 2011 that made its society more open.
- Eritrea – Human Rights Watch has described Eritrea as one of the world's most closed countries. Eritrea has a closed, militarized, and heavily fortified border with Ethiopia, its regional rival with which tensions are high.

== See also ==
- Gated community
- Capital controls
- Human capital flight
- Open society
