= Grete Stern =

Argentine photographer (1904–1999)

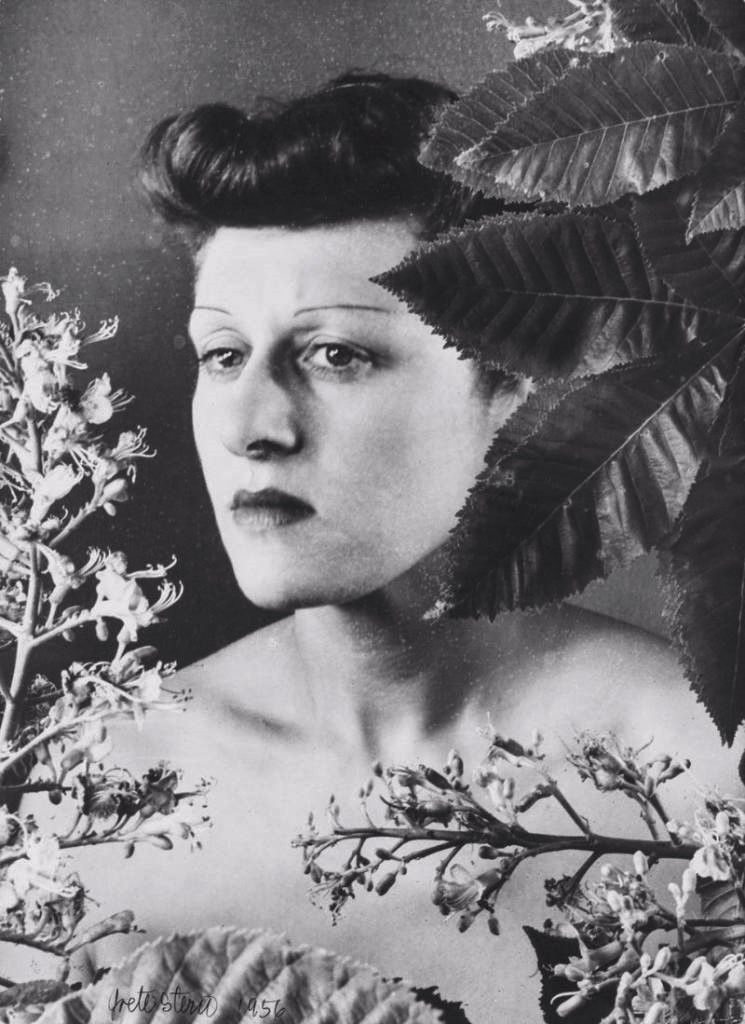
- Stern in 1956 (Self-portrait)
- Born: 9 May 1904; Wuppertal-Elberfeld, German Empire
- Died: 24 December 1999 (aged 95); Buenos Aires, Argentina
- Occupation: Photography

Grete Stern (9 May 1904 – 24 December 1999) was a German-Argentine photographer. Between April 1930 and March 1933, she studied at the Bauhaus. With her husband Horacio Coppola, she helped modernize the visual arts in Argentina, and presented the first exhibition of modern photographic art in Buenos Aires, in 1935.

== Early life ==
The daughter of Frida Hochberger and Louis Stern, Grete Stern was born on 9 May 1904 in Elberfeld, Germany. She often visited family in England and attended primary school there. After reaching adulthood, from 1923 to 1925 she studied graphic arts at the Kunstgewerbeschule, Stuttgart, but after a short term working in the field she was inspired by the photography of Edward Weston and Paul Outerbridge to change her focus to photography. Relocating to Berlin, she took private lessons from Walter Peterhans.

== Career ==
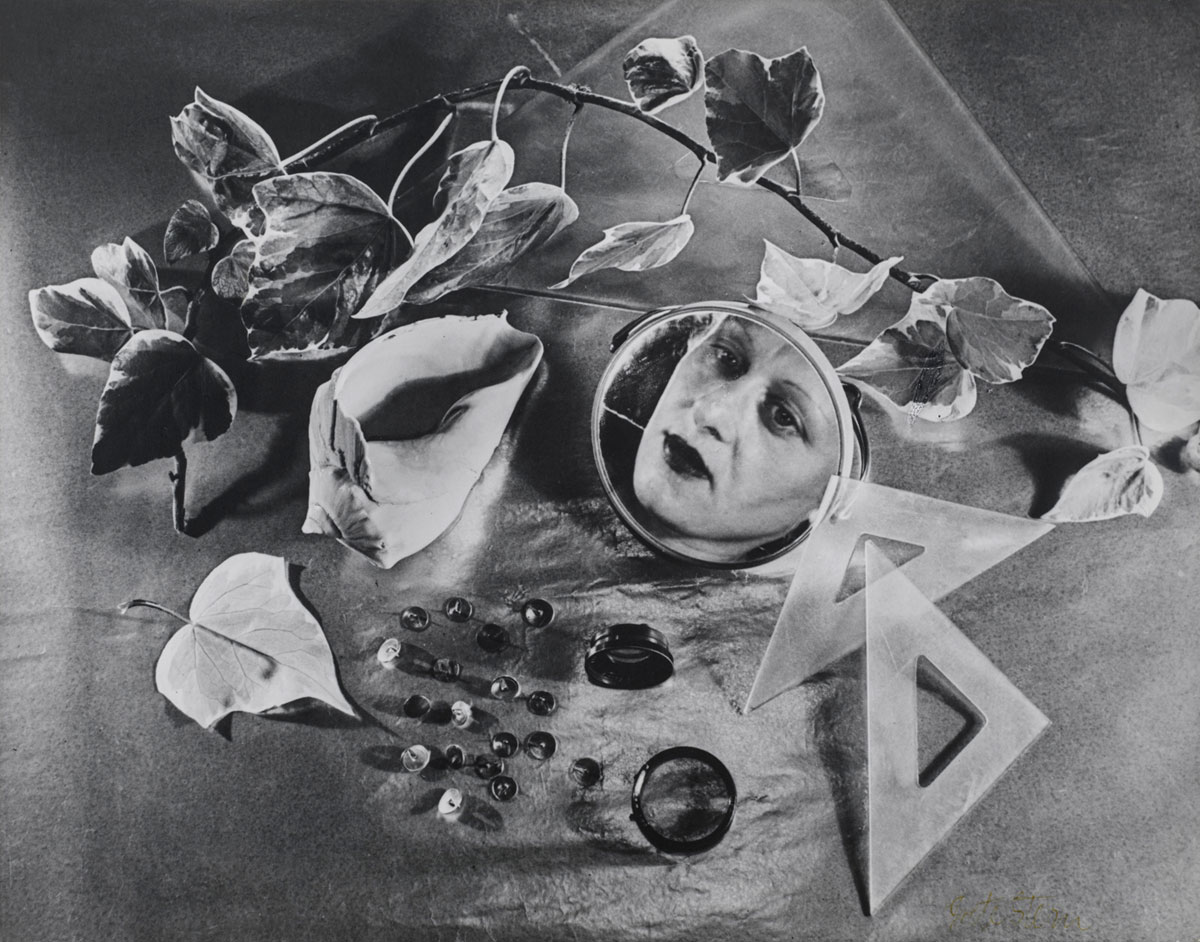
Grete Stern, Self-Portrait, 1943

In 1930 Stern and Ellen Rosenberg Auerbach founded ringl+pit, a critically acclaimed, prize-winning Berlin based photography and design studio. They used equipment purchased from Peterhans and became well known for innovative work in advertising. The name ringl+pit is from their childhood nicknames (Ringl for Grete, Pit for Ellen).

Intermittently between April 1930 and March 1933, Stern continued her studies with Peterhans at the Bauhaus photography workshop in Dessau, where she met the Argentinian photographer Horacio Coppola. In 1933 the political climate of Nazi Germany led her to emigrate with her brother to England, where Stern set up a new studio, soon to resume her collaboration there with Auerbach.

Stern first traveled to Argentina in the company of her new husband, Horacio Coppola in 1935. The newlyweds mounted an exhibition in Buenos Aires at Sur magazine, which according to the magazine, was the first modern photography exhibition in Argentina. In 1958, she became a citizen of Argentina.

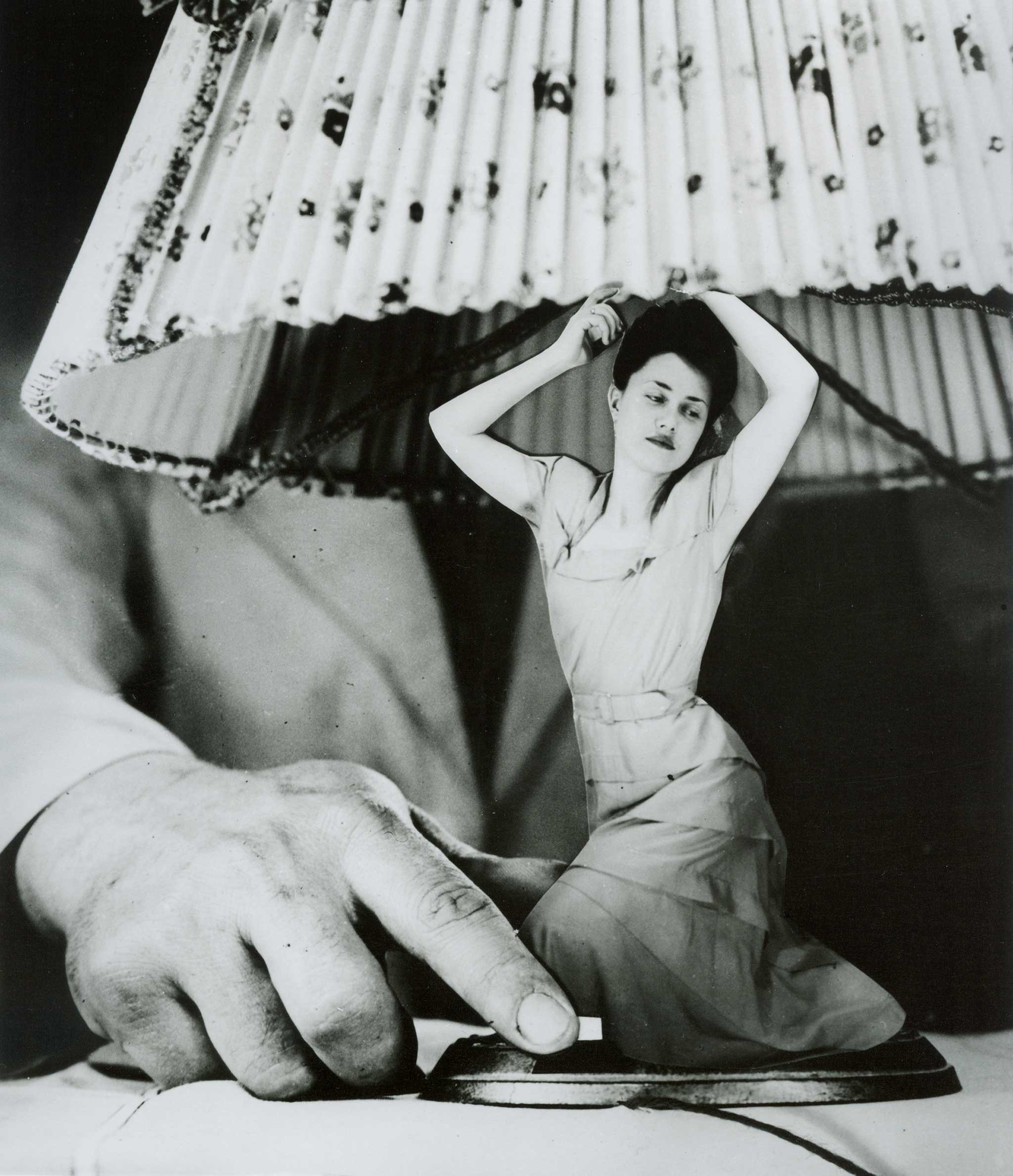
Grete Stern. Articulos eléctricos para el hogar (Electrical appliances for the home) 1950

In 1948 Stern began working for Idilio, an illustrated women's magazine, targeted specifically at lower/lower-middle class women. In the late 1940s and early 1950s, Stern created Los Sueños as illustrations for the woman's magazine Idilio and its column "El psicoanálisis te ayudará" (Psychoanalysis Will Help You). Readers were encouraged to submit their dreams to be analyzed by the 'experts' as an aid for its readers to find "self-knowledge and self-aid that would help them succeed in love, family and work". Each week, one dream would be selected, analyzed in depth by the expert, Richard Rest, and then illustrated by Stern through photomontage. Stern created about 150 of these photomontages, of which only 46 survive in negatives. Stern's photomontages are surreal interpretations of the readers' dreams that often subtly pushed back on the traditional values and concepts in Idilio magazine by inserting feminist critique of Argentinian gender roles and the psychoanalytic project in her images. The Idilio series has often been compared to Francisco Goya's Sueños drawings, a series of preliminary drawings for his later body of work, Los Caprichos; they have also been directly compared to Los Caprichos themselves.

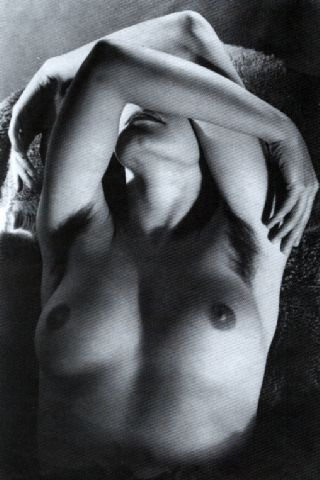
Desnudo III, 1946

Stern provided photographs for the magazine and served for a stint as a photography teacher in Resistencia at the National University of the Northeast in 1959 and continued to teach until 1985.

== Death ==
In 1985, she retired from photography, but lived another 14 years until 1999, dying in Buenos Aires on 24 December at the age of 95.

== Legacy ==
In 1995 documentarian Juan Mandelbaum made a documentary about Studio Ringl + Pit, which was reviewed in the New York Times In 2015 her work was the subject of an exhibition at New York's Museum of Modern Art called "From Bauhaus to Buenos Aires: Grete Stern and Horatio Coppola."

== Collections ==
Stern's work is held in the following permanent collections:

- The Jewish Museum
- The Museum of Modern Art
- The Metropolitan Museum
- The J. Paul Getty Museum

== See also ==
- Women of the Bauhaus
