= Wallat =

Wallat is a surname. Notable people with the surname include:

- Hans Wallat (1929–2014), German conductor
- Paul Wallat (1879–1964), German landscape artist, draftsman and sculptor
- Stefan Wallat (born 1987), German rower

== See also ==
- Wallas (disambiguation)
