= Nanne =

Nanne may refer to:

- Nanne (given name)
- Nanne (surname)
