= Christian Saehrendt =

German art historian (born 1968)

Christian Saehrendt (born 1968 in Kassel) is a German art historian.

== Life ==
Saehrendt studied Fine Arts at Hamburger Hochschule für bildende Künste, History and Art History (focused on 19th and 20th centuries) at Humboldt-Universität Berlin and at Ruprecht-Karls-Universität Heidelberg. In Heidelberg he also received his Ph.D. in 2002 with a work about the Expressionist Ernst Ludwig Kirchner. Since 1989, Christian is cooperating with his friend Steen T. Kittl. Since 2007, they wrote seven monographs about Art and recent cultural phenomena. In 2020, they launched the Art Blog "kingkunst.de" (in German Language). Since 2002, Christian Saehrendt is continuing his work as a scholar, regarding the issues Art history and culture of the 20th century (specially Expressionism, political monuments, art in GDR); Art and sociology, Art as a political tool or weapon (politics of collecting, cultural exchange and art exhibitions as parts of diplomatic strategies, Art as tool of nation building).

== Publications ==
=== Monographs ===
Schneewittchen und der kopflose Kurator. Der Reiseführer für documenta-Besucher, Romantiker und Horrorfans, Cologne 2017.

Ist das Kunst oder kann das weg? Vom wahren Wert der Kunst (with Steen T. Kittl), Cologne 2016.

Gefühlige Zeiten. Die zwanghafte Sehnsucht nach dem Echten, Cologne 2015.

Kassel. Ist das Kunst oder kann das weg? Documenta-Geschichten, Mythen und Märchen, Cologne 2012.

Blamage! Geschichte der Peinlichkeit, Berlin 2012.

Alles Bluff. Wie wir zu Hochstaplern werden, ohne es zu wollen. Oder vielleicht doch? (with Steen T. Kittl), Munich 2011. (Korean Edition 2012.)

Geier am Grabe van Goghs ...und andere häßliche Geschichten aus der Welt der Schönen Künste (with Steen T. Kittl), DuMont Cologne 2010.

Was will Kunst? (with Steen T. Kittl), Frankfurt 2009. Korean Edition (Republic of Korea) and Chinese Edition (Taiwan) 2011.

Das sagt mir was! Sprachführer Deutsch-Kunst/Kunst-Deutsch (with Steen T. Kittl), Cologne 2008.

Das kann ich auch! Gebrauchsanweisung für moderne Kunst (with Steen T. Kittl), Cologne 2007. Turkish Edition 2013 and 2014, Chinese Edition 2008 and 2010 (Taiwan and People's Republic), Spanish Edition 2012 and 2014. New German edition 2013.

=== Scholarship - Monographs and Essays (selection) ===
- Kunst im Kreuzfeuer. documenta, Weimarer Republik, Pariser Salons: Moderne Kunst im Visier von Extremisten und Populisten, Franz Steiner Verlag Stuttgart, 2020. Reviewed by Paul Stephan in: http://www.sehepunkte.de/2020/12/35009.html
- Kunst im Kampf für das Sozialistische Weltsystem. Die Auswärtige Kulturpolitik der DDR in Afrika und Nahost, Stuttgart 2017. Reviewed by Ulrich van der Heyden in Zeitschrift für Geschichtswissenschaft 1/2018 p. 101f,
- Kunst als Botschafter einer künstlichen Nation. Studien zur Rolle der Bildenden Kunst in der Auswärtigen Kulturpolitik der DDR, Steiner Stuttgart 2009. (Series Pallas Athene. Beiträge zur Universitäts- und Wissenschaftsgeschichte, Vol. 27, Rüdiger vom Bruch and Eckart Henning, eds.)
- Der Stellungskrieg der Denkmäler. Kriegerdenkmäler im Berlin der Zwischenkriegszeit, Dietz Bonn 2004. (Series: Politik- und Gesellschaftsgeschichte der Friedrich-Ebert-Stiftung, Michael Schneider and Dieter Dowe, eds). Reviewed in German History 2/2006 by Tim Grady.
- Essay (in English): „The Holocaust Memorial in Berlin“

In: The Burlington Magazine, Dezember 2005.

- Die Kunst der „Brücke“ zwischen Staatskunst und Verfemung. Expressionistische Kunst als Politikum in der Weimarer Republik, im „Dritten Reich“ und im Kalten Krieg, Steiner Stuttgart 2005. (Series Pallas Athene. Beiträge zur Universitäts- und Wissenschaftsgeschichte, Vol. 13, Rüdiger vom Bruch and Eckart Henning, eds). Reviewed in German History 2/2007 by Elizabeth Janik; Revue del I'art 4/2006 by Mathilde Arnoux (French).
- Essay (in English): „The art of Brücke as a political issue“

In: Christian Weikop (Hg.), New perspectives on Brücke expressionism: bridging history, Farnham (Ashgate) 2011.

- Essay about Expressionism (in English):
- Ernst Ludwig Kirchner: Bohème-Identität und nationale Sendung, Peter Lang Frankfurt 2003.
