= Grete Gross =

German commercial artist (born 1890)

Adrienne Elisabeth Margarethe 'Grete' Gross (April 7, 1890, in Riga – after 1944) was a Russian-German commercial artist. She achieved fame in the 1920s and became known as an advertiser. She was committed to feminism.

== Education ==
Gross was born into a Baltic German family in Riga, then a Russian city. She took drawing lessons there, but left her homeland in 1911 to study at the Staatliche Kunstgewerbeschule Hamburg. She took courses with Wilhelm Niemeyer, Carl-Otto Czeschka, Willy Tietze and Paul Helms on the subjects of lithography, nude drawing and graphic art.

Her studies were interrupted by World War I. During a stay in Vienna, Gross was interned in a convent for six months until she returned to Riga through the efforts of her relatives. Von dort stammt ihr ältestes bekanntes Werk, eine Anzeige für die Baltische Illustrierte Zeitung. In the winter of 1918/1919, Gross fled and made her way back to Hamburg via Stettin to finish her studies.

== Professional activity ==
In 1919, Grete Gross set up her own business as one of Hamburg's first commercial artists. She produced work for Samurai Zigarette, the Weberei Pausa and Montblanc fountain pens. In 1919 and 1920, she exhibited her posters and packaging at the Leipzig Grassi-Messe. She was also active in the Hamburg art scene and designed the posters for the Kostümfeste Die Dämmerung der Zeitlosen and Das Fest in Rot.

=== Montblanc advertising manager ===
On August 1, 1919, Gross took up a position at the writing instrument manufacturer Montblanc (then: Simplo Füllfedergesellschaft). There she created advertisements, window displays and packaging and is considered the creator of the word mark, which has only been slightly modified to this day. Her style was characterized by stylized forms, dynamic layouts and bold typography. The activities she designed to systematically increase awareness of the brand are still impressive today. For example, she combined the depiction of oversized products with airplanes or automobiles, which were used as advertising media at trade fairs or vacation destinations. The commercial artist thus went conceptually beyond the previously known boundaries of her professional field, shaping the brand image and making a career: with the support of company co-owner Wilhelm Dziambor, she set up an in-house advertising department, headed it and became an Prokuristin in 1925.

This position, unusual for a woman at the time, made Gross famous as an advertising expert and enabled her to lead an upscale lifestyle. She traveled to the US in 1928 to speak at a symposium and in 1931 gave a newspaper interview in the series Hamburg's Creative Women. In the same year, there is even documentation of a trip on the airship Graf Zeppelin.

=== Gre-Gro master workshops and advertising consultancy ===
At the end of 1934, Grete Gross left Montblanc after a change of management. She founded her own advertising studio on Hamburg's Jungfernstieg - the Gre-Gro Meisterwerkstätten. Little is known about her work and clients there. In 1934, her participation in one of the first NS Propaganda Fairs in Bremen is documented: At the stand of the Hamburg Women's Chamber of Commerce, which she designed, the role of women in the Nazi state was addressed in the form of various stage sets, including on the subject of "retraining" - "The girl who has left school and the woman who is not in a profession are (...) assigned to the household". In another scene, the "Committee for Trade" is presented, which promotes "women's work in the clothing trade". The reporting journalist summarizes the statement of the stage sets as follows: The working woman was no longer "a competitor of the man, but at his side, be it as the life companion or at the workplace." At this point, Gross was already a member of the "National Socialist Reich Association of German Advertising Professionals (NSRDW)" founded in November 1933, membership of which became compulsory for people working in commercial art from 1938; no active political involvement in National Socialism is known to date.

Gross' last known commercial art work is a New Year's card for Hamburger Verkehrsmittel-Werbung GmbH from 1936/1937.
