= Hochschule für bildende Künste Hamburg =

Fine Arts University in Germany

Coordinates: 53°34′3″N 10°1′53″E

HFBK University of Fine Arts Hamburg
- Hochschule für bildende Künste Hamburg (HFBK Hamburg)
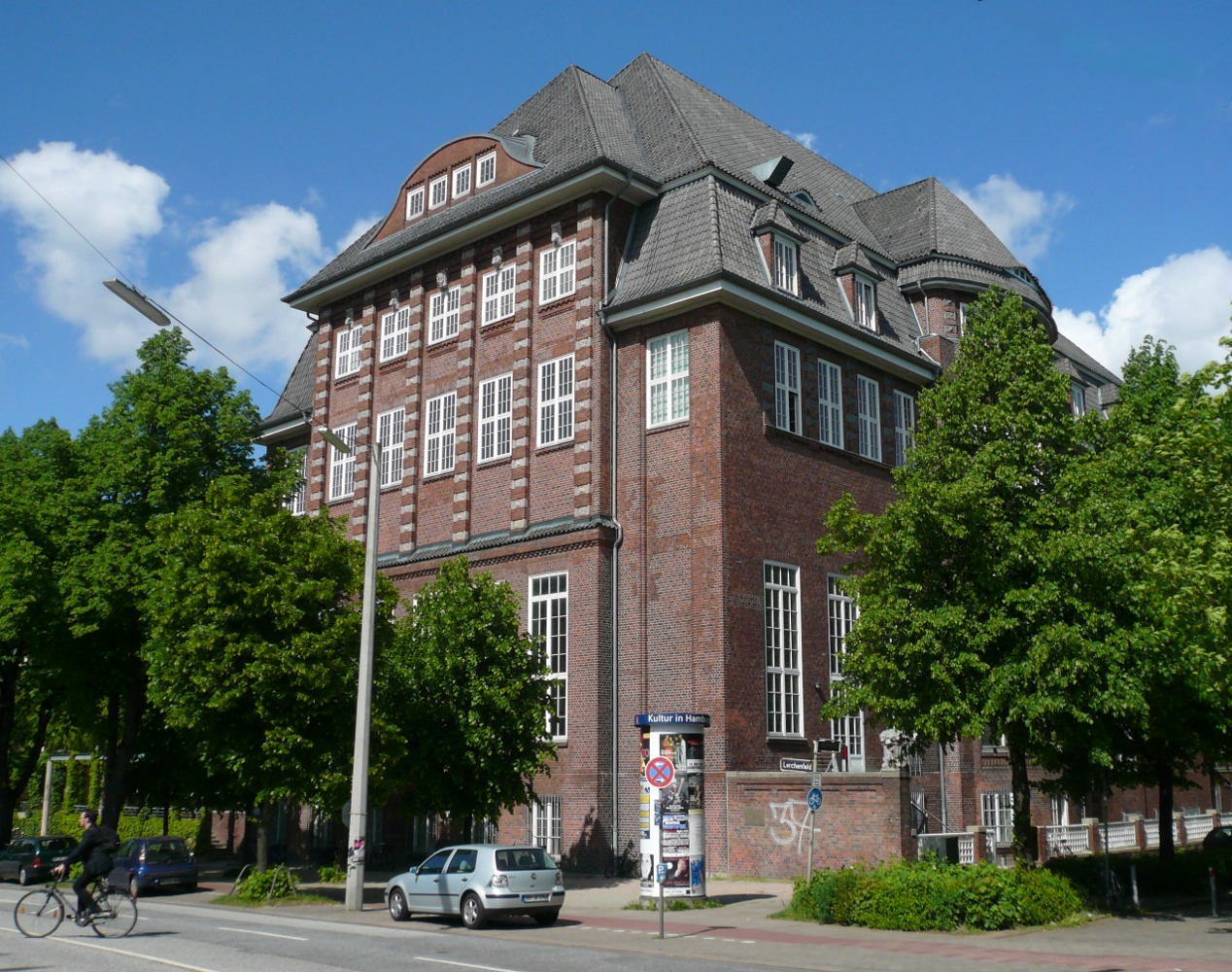
- Main building
- Former names: Hamburger Gewerbeschule (1767–1896); Staatliche Kunstgewerbeschule (1896–1928); Landeskunstschule Hamburg (1928–1933; 1945–1955); Hochschule für bildende Künste Hamburg (1955–present)
- Motto: Hier lernen Studierende, keine Professorinnen
- Type: Public Fine Arts University
- Established: 1767; 259 years ago
- Founder: Patriotische Gesellschaft von 1765
- President: Martin Köttering
- Students: 979 (2025–2026), including approximately 350 international students
- Location: Hamburg, Germany
- Campus: Urban
- Website: hfbk-hamburg.de/en

The Hochschule für bildende Künste Hamburg ("University of Fine Arts Hamburg"), also known as HFBK Hamburg, is an arts university in Hamburg, in northern Germany. It dates to 1767, when it was called the Hamburger Gewerbeschule; later it became known as Landeskunstschule Hamburg. The main building, in the Uhlenhorst quarter of Hamburg-Nord borough, was designed by architect Fritz Schumacher, and built between 1911 and 1913. In 1970, it was accredited as an artistic-scientific university.

The University of Fine Arts Hamburg (HFBK) is an internationally oriented art university that combines artistic practice with academic research. Its interdisciplinary approach allows students to work across different artistic disciplines and develop experimental methods of practice and research.

The Fine Arts programme encompasses sculpture, painting, drawing and printmaking, photography, film, design, stage design and time-based media. It also includes the study of art theory and art history. Students have access to specialised workshops and facilities for working with a wide range of materials and techniques, including ceramics, metal, wood, textiles, photography and printmaking.

Alongside teaching, the HFBK promotes artistic research, public debate and collaboration with cultural institutions. Its Institute for Contemporary Art and Transfer (ICAT) organises exhibitions and events and facilitates exchanges between the university and the wider public. International cooperation is supported through initiatives such as the Art School Alliance and an artist-in-residence programme focusing on artistic research in the Global South and providing support for artists at risk.

Sculpture "Elbe" by Richard Luksch

In addition to its artistic-scientific doctorate (Dr. phil. in art.), the university launched the PhD in Art Practice in 2025, a doctoral programme centred on research-based artistic practice.

== International Student Profile ==
International exchange plays a central role at the HFBK Hamburg, where approximately 50% of students have an international background. The university supports international engagement through exchange programmes, collaborative projects, scholarships and artist-in-residence initiatives.

Its extensive network of art academies, museums, galleries, festivals and cultural organisations provides students and faculty with opportunities to work across cultural contexts, develop new perspectives and strengthen international artistic and academic connections.

== History ==
The Hamburger Gewerbeschule ('Hamburg vocational school') was founded in 1767 by the Patriotische Gesellschaft ('patriotic society'). It was named the Staatliche Kunstgewerbeschule ('school of arts and crafts' or 'school of applied arts') in 1896, later the Landeskunstschule Hamburg ('state school of art').

Fritz Schumacher designed the main building especially for the art school. Located at Am Lerchenfeld 2 in Uhlenhorst, a quarter of Hamburg-Nord, it was built between 1911 and 1913. After World War II, it re-opened as the Landeskunstschule by Friedrich Ahlers-Hestermann, who had previously been a professor at the Kölner Werkschulen ('Cologne academy of fine arts'). He was succeeded by architect Gustav Hassenpflug, who changed the institution to the Hochschule für bildende Künste Hamburg. The school was accredited as a university in 1970.

Prof. Arthur Illies's class at the University of Fine Arts of Hamburg,1932 (Landeskunstschule Hamburg)

In 1985, the auditorium hosted Robert Filliou and René Block’s Biennale des Friedens, accompanied by a concert featuring Nam June Paik, Henning Christiansen and Joseph Beuys. Adrienne Goehler served as the university’s first female president from 1989 to 2001, followed by renovations to the entrance area designed by Bernhard Winking in 1992–1993. Under Martin Köttering, who became president in 2002, the university appointed numerous female professors, including Jeanne Faust, Jutta Koether, Julia Lohmann, Michaela Melián and Marjetica Potrč.

In 2006, architecture studies moved to the newly established HafenCity University. Two years later, the university introduced an interdisciplinary Fine Arts programme offering bachelor’s and master’s degrees, alongside an artistic-scientific doctorate. The Art School Alliance was established in 2010, creating exchange opportunities with partner institutions in cities including Boston, Hangzhou, London, Paris, San Francisco and Vienna.

Restoration of the auditorium and Willy von Beckerath’s mural Die Ewige Welle began in 2011. In 2013, the university marked the centenary of the Fritz Schumacher building at Lerchenfeld and renovated its premises at Wartenau 15. A doctoral programme in artistic research followed in 2015, alongside library modernisation. In 2016, the canteen was redesigned and plans advanced for a new studio building.

The university celebrated its 250th anniversary in 2017. The following year, an artist-in-residence and guest lectureship programme was launched to support international artistic research, particularly in the Global South, and provide residencies for artists at risk.

In 2022, a new master’s studio building designed by Winking Froh Architekten opened, alongside the establishment of the Institute for Contemporary Art & Transfer (ICAT). The Art School Alliance also expanded to include institutions in Kampala and Lagos. The Extended Library, designed by asdfg Architekten, opened in 2023. In October 2024, a new Film House with its own cinema marked six decades of film education.

== Degree programmes ==
In the winter semester of 2008/09, HFBK introduced a consecutive Bachelor’s and Master’s degree programme in Fine Arts, replacing the previous Diplom programmes. The interdisciplinary programme covers all artistic and academic disciplines represented at HFBK. All students are enrolled in Fine Arts, while they can choose to combine several areas of study or focus on a single one. This allows students to develop an individual artistic and/or academic profile.

The Bachelor’s programme takes four years (eight semesters), followed by a two-year Master’s programme (four semesters). Since 2008, HFBK has also awarded the doctoral degree Dr. phil. in art (Doctor philosophiae in artibus). In January 2015, the graduate research programme Ästhetiken des Virtuellen (Aesthetics of the Virtual) began at HFBK. Since 2025, HFBK Hamburg has offered the doctoral programme PhD in Art Practice.

== Areas of study ==
=== Bachelor’s Degree Programme in Fine Arts ===
Students can choose to combine different areas of study or focus on a single one.

- Sculpture
- Stage Design/Stage Space
- Design
- Film
- Graphic Design/Type/Photography
- Painting/Drawing
- Theory and History
- Time-Based Media

The architecture programme was transferred in 2006 to the newly established HafenCity University Hamburg, following the merger of all architecture programmes in Hamburg, including those at HFBK and the Hamburg University of Applied Sciences.

=== PhD in Art Practice ===
Since 2025, HFBK Hamburg has offered the PhD in Art Practice, a doctoral programme focused on practice-based artistic research. The programme aims to develop and strengthen the production of aesthetic knowledge in and through the arts, with an emphasis on interdisciplinary and transdisciplinary research carried out through artistic practice. Research is understood as an open-ended process of knowledge production.

The programme places particular emphasis on the methods of artistic knowledge production and their critical reflection. Doctoral projects combine artistic practice and theoretical research, with the aim of developing independent and critical knowledge within a specific field of the arts. The programme also seeks to strengthen the dialogue between artistic research and wider society.

The PhD can be pursued in several of HFBK's artistic fields, including Sculpture, Design, Film, Painting/Drawing, Stage Space, Time-Based Media, and Graphics/Photography. Research topics and methods are expected to engage with the contemporary and historical practices and theories of the respective field.

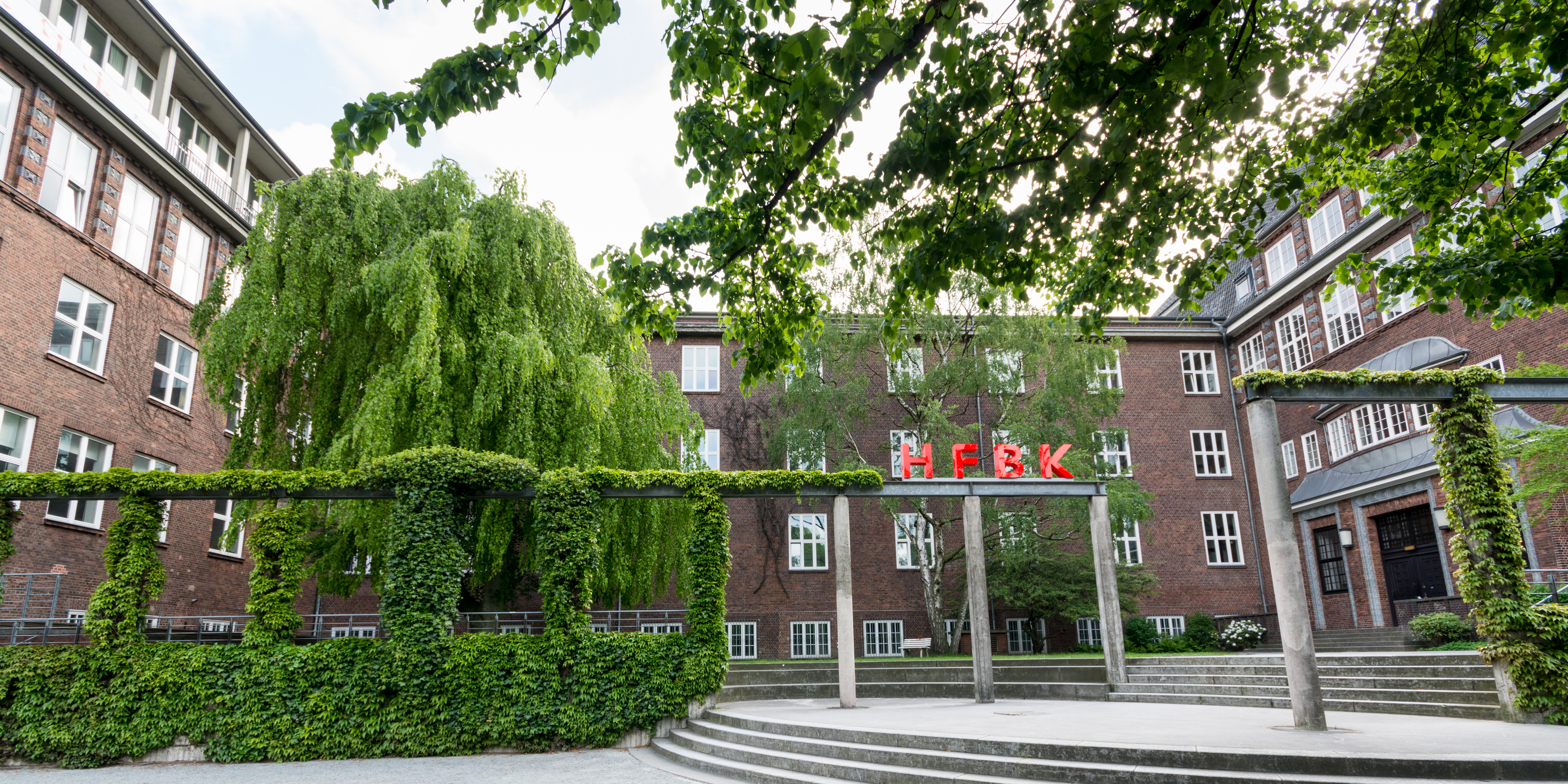
Main Building (HFBK)

The interdisciplinary programme prepares graduates to conduct independent artistic research in accordance with international standards and to take on teaching, coordinating and leadership roles in higher education and the art world. Doctoral candidates complete an 11-SWS programme of in-person courses, taught in both German and English, focusing on the foundations of artistic research and its presentation.

After five semesters of participation in the programme, doctoral candidates are eligible to take the examination, for which they submit a research-based artistic work. The detailed examination requirements are set out in HFBK's doctoral regulations.

=== Dr. phil. in art. ===
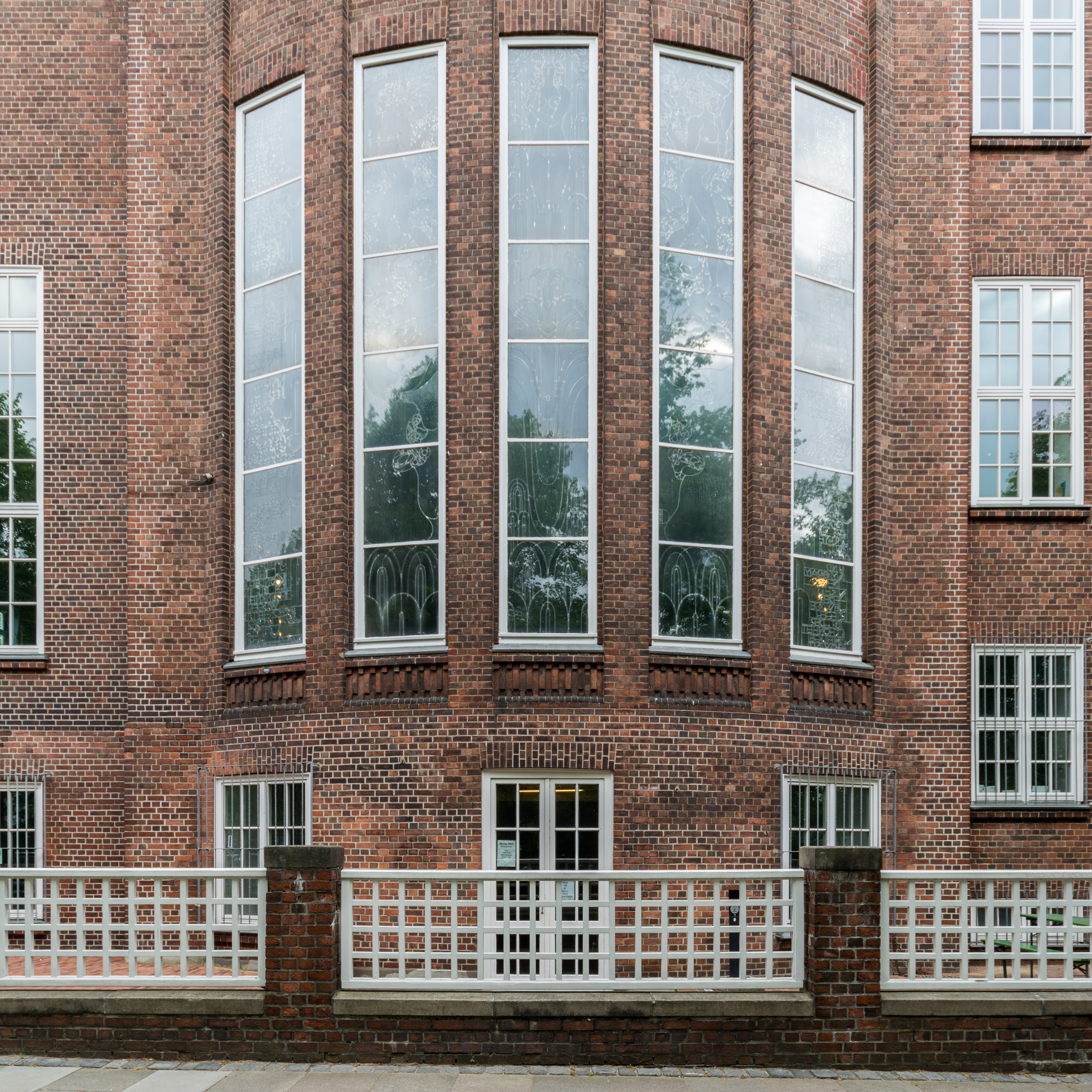

HFBK Hamburg awards the doctoral degree Dr. phil. in art. (philosophiae in artibus). In keeping with the university’s transdisciplinary approach, the programme supports doctoral research that contributes to the study of the arts from a range of perspectives, including analyses of artistic works and investigations into historical, social, media-related and cultural processes that have influenced artistic discourse or have themselves been shaped by it.

HFBK also supervises dissertations that explore concepts in art theory and philosophy through which artistic practices reflect on themselves and examine their own nature and understanding. In addition to conventional research-based doctorates, the university also supports doctoral projects with a substantial artistic component, provided that the relationship between the artistic work and the academic requirements of the doctorate is clearly defined.

== Internationalisation ==
HFBK places a strong emphasis on the internationalisation of the university and its student body. In addition to appointing internationally renowned professors and academics with international experience, the university actively promotes international exchange among its students. Its large network of partner institutions within the European Union's Erasmus programme provides students with extensive opportunities for international mobility.

Since 2010, international exchange has also extended beyond Europe through the Art School Alliance (ASA), established in cooperation with the Alfred Toepfer Stiftung F.V.S.. The programme provides scholarships for up to 18 international art students each year, allowing them to live and work together for one semester in a former factory loft in Hamburg without paying rent or tuition fees. In return, up to 18 HFBK students each year spend a semester at one of the partner institutions without having to pay tuition fees there.

Current Art School Alliance partner institutions include:

- School of the Museum of Fine Arts, Tufts University, Boston
- Universidad del Cine, Buenos Aires
- China Academy of Art, Hangzhou
- Bezalel Academy of Arts and Design, Jerusalem
- Goldsmiths, University of London, Department of Art
- California Institute of the Arts, Los Angeles
- Kindai University, Department of Design, Osaka
- École nationale supérieure des beaux-arts de Paris
- San Francisco Art Institute
- Institute of Design, China Academy of Art, Shanghai
- Academy of Fine Arts Vienna
- School of Arts, University of Haifa
- Makerere University, Kampala
- University of Lagos, Visual Arts

=== The mural Die ewige Welle by Willy von Beckerath ===
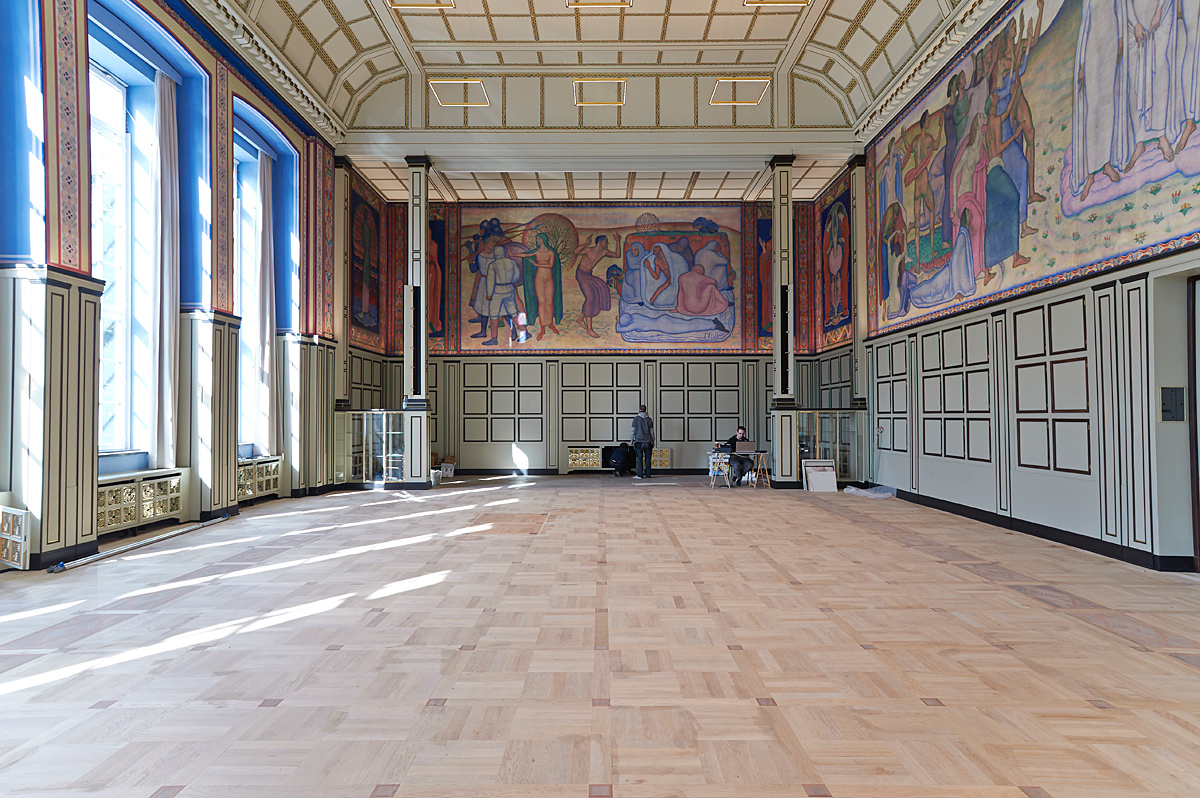
Die ewige Welle

The mural Die ewige Welle ('The Eternal Wave') in the auditorium is considered the major work of Willy von Beckerath. Consisting of eight sections, it symbolically depicts the rise and fall of a cultural era. The mural was created between 1911 and 1918. Around 2009, it was restored in several stages to recover its original colour scheme.

To mark the centenary of the HFBK building in 2013, the ceiling and wall paintings in the auditorium were also uncovered and restored, while the ornate parquet floor was renovated. As a result, the auditorium can once again be experienced as a unified large-scale work of art.

=== Public events ===
Many events at HFBK are open to the public.[1] In addition to regular symposia, lectures, performance nights and film screenings, the university hosts three major annual exhibitions: the Graduate Exhibition, held in early July; the Annual Exhibition, presenting work produced by students during the academic year and held in February; and the Hiscox Art Prize Exhibition, which takes place in October to mark the beginning of the academic year.

Throughout the semester, exhibitions presented in HFBK’s gallery, which is curated by changing teams of students, as well as the regular Tuesday evening exhibition series Folgendes, provide opportunities for artistic exchange both within the university and with the wider public.

== Protests (2007) ==
In July 2007, a scandal occurred when the university administration under Martin Köttering came under political pressure to expel students for having protested newly introduced tuition fees. Joerg Draeger and the Hamburg Senate, dominated by the Christian Democratic Union (CDU) demanded expulsion of more than half of the art students for having taken part in a tuition boycott. The scandal gained nationwide press coverage. In June 2008, about 680 students were enrolled at HFBK Hamburg.

== Teachers and students persecuted under the Nazi regime ==
Two Stolpersteine (memorial stones) embedded in the pavement in front of the main staircase of the University of Fine Arts Hamburg commemorate teachers who were persecuted under the Nazi regime. Friedrich Adler taught at the former School of Arts and Crafts from 1907 until he was forcibly retired in 1933. He was murdered at Auschwitz in 1942. Hugo Meier-Thur taught at the institution from 1910 until 1943, when he was murdered at Fuhlsbüttel concentration camp. A third Stolperstein commemorates former student Felix Nussbaum, who was murdered at Auschwitz-Birkenau in 1944.

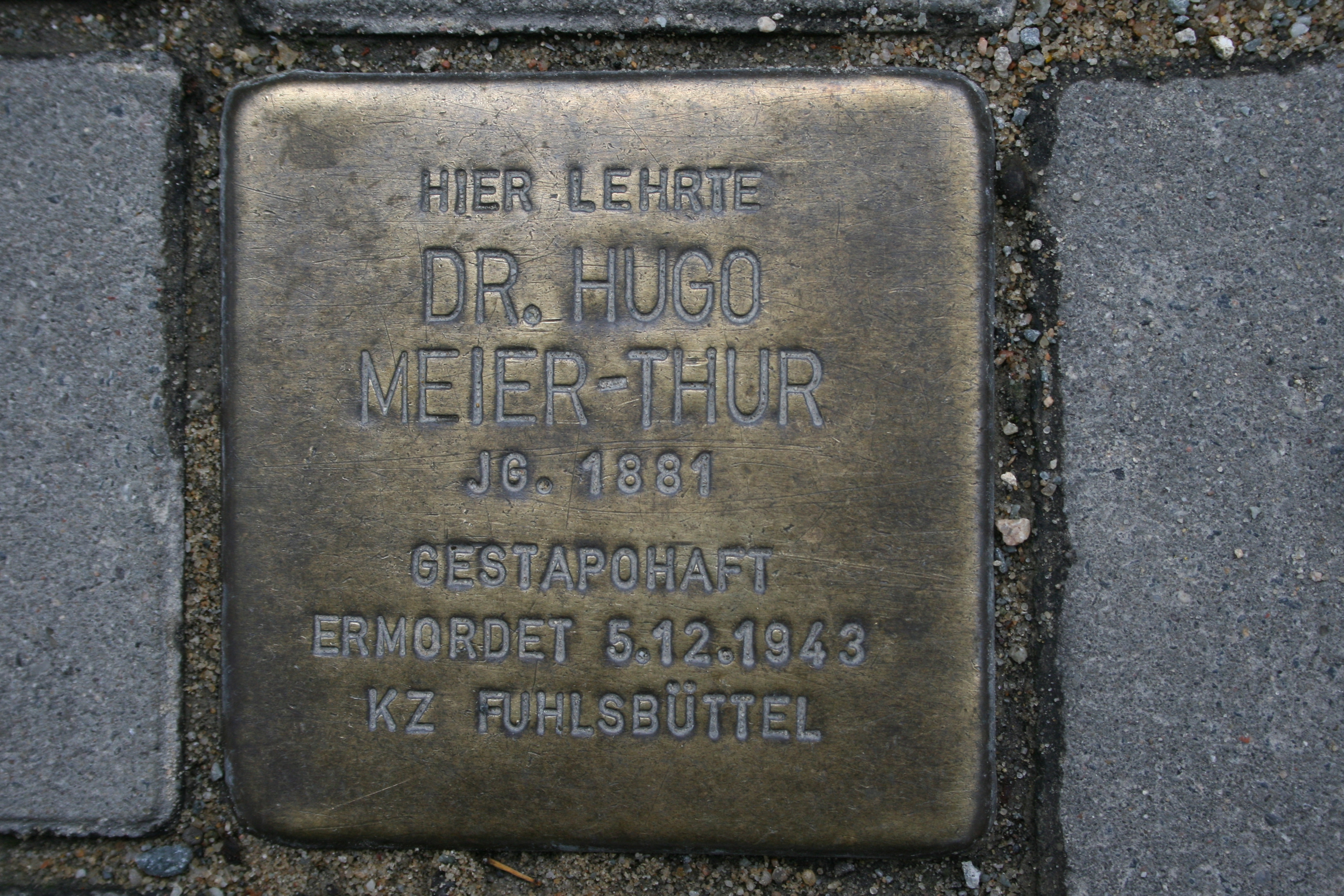
Stolperstein commemorating Hugo Meier-Thur in front of the University of Fine Arts Hamburg

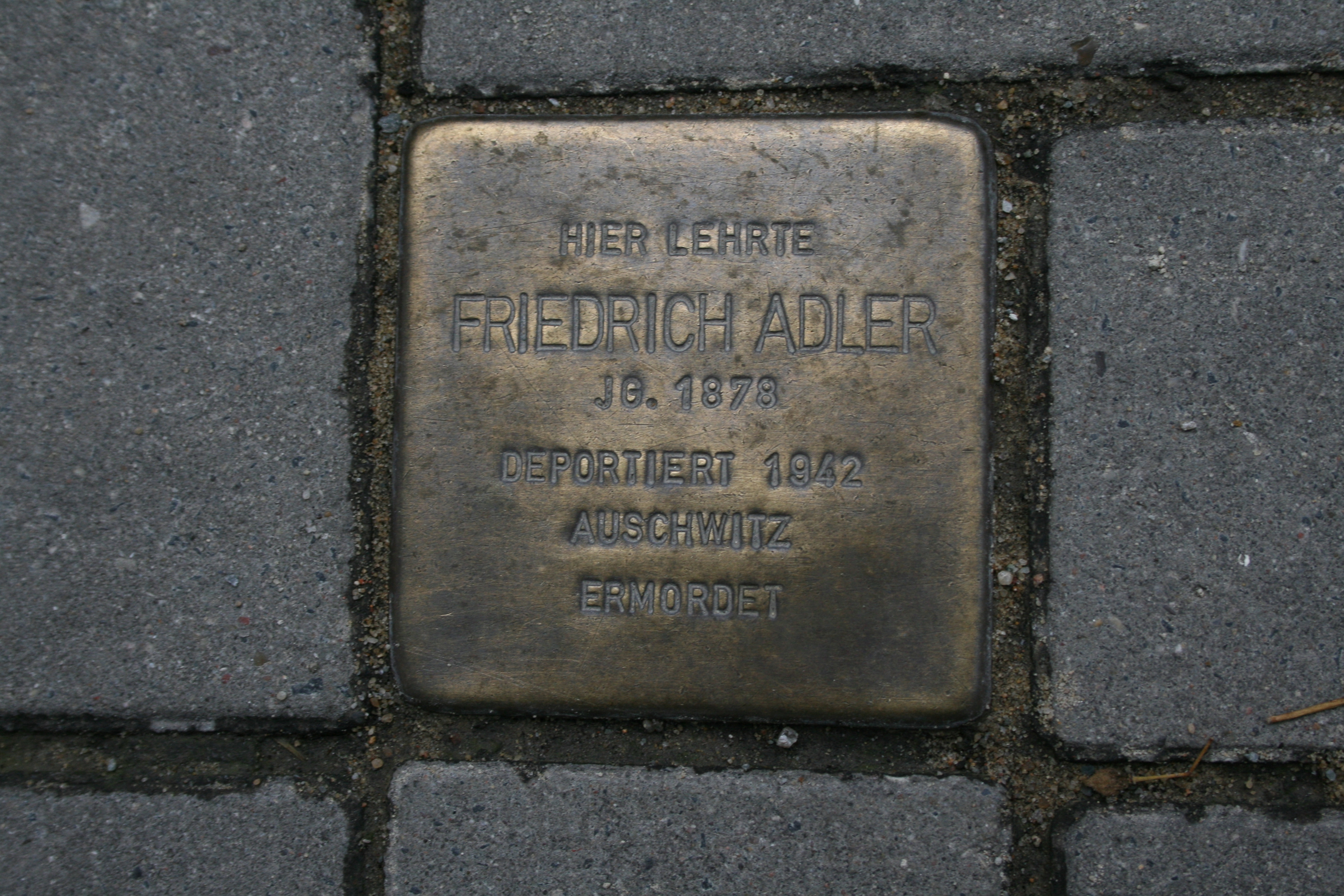
Stolperstein commemorating Friedrich Adler in front of the University of Fine Arts Hamburg

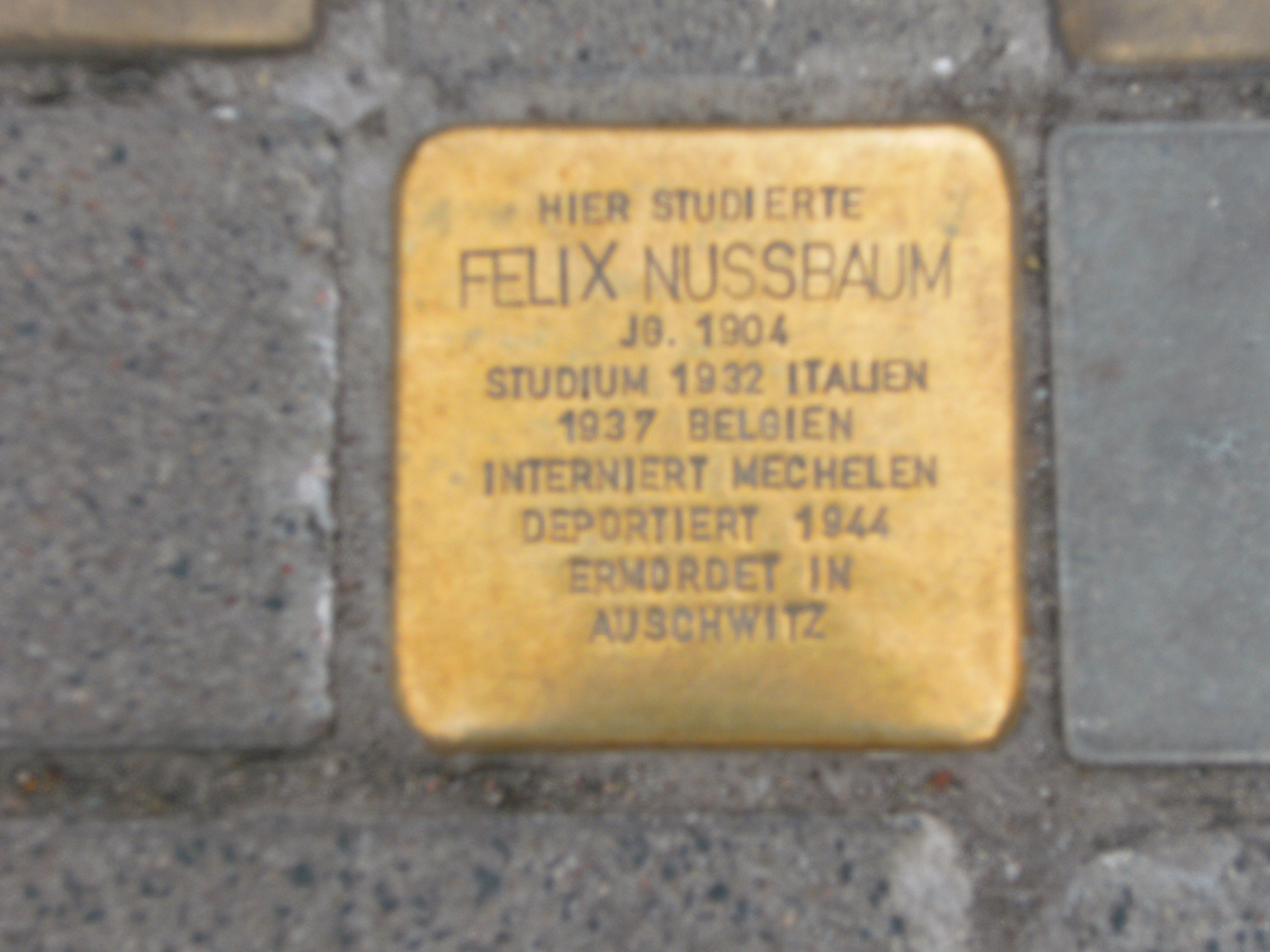
Stolperstein commemorating former student Felix Nussbaum (1904–1944) at the University of Fine Arts Hamburg

== Notable alumni ==
This list includes alumni from University of Fine Arts of Hamburg, listed by last name alphabetical order.

- Theo Akkermann (1907–1982) sculptor, was a student from 1926 to 1929
- Fatih Akin (born 1973), film director, screenwriter and producer, student from 1994 to 2000
- Uwe Bahnsen (1930–2013), German car designer
- Esther Berlin-Joel (1895–1972) Israeli designer
- Hans Breder (1935–2017), interdisciplinary artist and professor, student from 1961 to 1964
- Woldemar Brinkmann (1890–1959), architect and interior designer
- Bruno Bruni (born 1935), Italian lithographer, graphic artist, painter and sculptor, student from 1960 to 1965
- Bernhard Cella (born 1969), Austrian artist and curator
- Bastian Clevé (born 1950), filmmaker, student from 1971 to 1976
- Hanne Darboven (1941–2009), conceptual artist, was a student from 1962 to 1965
- Isa Genzken (born 1948), student from 1969 to 1977
- Oliver Hirschbiegel (born 1957), film director
- Rebecca Horn (born 1944), interdisciplinary artist, was a student from 1963/1964–1970
- Alfonso Hüppi (born 1935), Swiss painter, was a student, guest professor
- Hermine Huntgeburth (born 1957), film director
- Francesco Mariotti (born 1935), student from 1965 to 1969
- Horst Janssen (born 1929–1995), draftsman, printmaker, poster artist and illustrator, was a student from 1946 to 1951
- Martin Kippenberger (1953–1997), sculptor, student from 1972 to 1976
- Wolfgang Lauenstein (born 1962), film director
- Jonathan Meese (born 1970), painter, sculptor, performance artist and installation artist, student from 1993 to 1998
- Holger Meins (1941–1974), former Red Army Faction (RAF), student from 1962 to 1966
- Herbert Niebling (1903–1966), lace knit designer, student in the 1930s
- Albert Oehlen (born 1954), contemporary artist, student in the 1980s
- Hans Jürgen Press (1926–2002), illustrator and children's book author
- Astrid Proll (born 1946), early member of the Red Army Faction (RAF), and photo editor
- Daniel Richter (born 1962), painter
- Nicolaus Schmidt (born 1953), photographer and historian
- Santiago Sierra (born in 1966), performance and installation art, student 1989–1991
- Cornelia Sollfrank (born 1960), digital artist and early pioneer of internet art and Cyberfeminism, student from 1990 to 1994
- Annegret Soltau (born 1946), mixed media collage art, student from 1967 to 1972
- Otto Waalkes (born 1948), comedian, actor, and musician, a student in the 1970s
- Paul Wallat (1879–1964), landscape artist, draftsman and sculptor, student 1899–1902
- Ignatz Wiemeler (1895–1952) bookbinder
- Vicco von Bülow (1923–2011), student from 1947 to 1949
- Yüksel Yavuz (born 1964) film director
- Franz Ackermann (born 1963), painter and installation artist, student from 1989 to 1991
- Anni Albers (1899–1994), textile artist and printmaker, student from 1919 to 1921
- Stephan Balkenhol (born 1957), sculptor, student from 1976 to 1982
- John Bock (born 1965), performance and installation artist, graduated in 1997
- Cosima von Bonin (born 1962), conceptual and installation artist
- Ulla von Brandenburg (born 1974), installation andmultimedia artist, student from 1998 to 2004
- KP Brehmer (1938–1997), painter, graphic artist and filmmaker
- Thorsten Brinkmann (born 1971), sculptor, photographer and installation artist, student from 1997 to 2004
- André Butzer (born 1973), painter, student from 1995 to 1996
- Lutz Dammbeck (born 1948), filmmaker and media artist
- Lyonel Feininger (1871–1956), painter and printmaker, student from 1887 to 1888
- Gerhard Fietz (1910–1997), abstract painter, student from 1930 to 1932
- Lili Fischer (born 1947), performance artist, student from 1966 to 1973
- Georg Herold (born 1947), sculptor and installation artist, student from 1977 to 1981
- Charline von Heyl (born 1960), abstract painter
- Gavin Jantjes (born 1948), painter, printmaker and curator, student from 1970 to 1972
- Peter Piller (born 1968), conceptual artist and photographer, student from 1993 to 2000
- Andreas Slominski (born 1959), conceptual artist and sculptor, student from 1983 to 1986
- Henner Winckler (born 1969), film director and screenwriter, student from 1992 to 1998
- Paul Wunderlich (1927–2010), painter, sculptor and graphic artist, student from 1947 to 1951
- Karo Akpokiere (born 1981), Nigerian multidisciplinary artist and designer, graduated in 2020
- Annika Kahrs (born 1984), video, sound and performance artist, student from 2005 to 2012
- Paul Kolling (born 1993), media and conceptual artist, graduated in 2020
- Tanja Nis-Hansen (born 1988), Danish painter, student from 2014 to 2018
- Julia Phillips (born 1985), sculptor and installation artist, student from 2006 to 2012
- Sung Tieu (born 1987), conceptual and installation artist, student from 2009 to 2013
- Frieda Toranzo Jaeger (born 1988), Mexican painter, student in the 2010s
- Helena Wittmann (born 1982), filmmaker and visual artist, student from 2007 to 2014
- Leyla Yenirce (born 1992), multimedia and sound artist, student from 2016 to 2022
- Karl Allöder (1898–1981), sculptor, painter and violin maker, student from 1922
- Ulrike Andresen (1949–2006), painter and graphic artist, student from 1977 to 1983
- Elsbeth Arlt (born 1948), painter and graphic artist, student from 1972 to 1977
- Dieter Asmus (born 1939), painter and graphic artist, student from 1960 to 1967
- Hans-Günther Baass (1909–1991), painter
- Thomas Baldischwyler (born 1974), artist
- Uwe Bangert (1927–2017), painter and graphic artist, student from 1950 to 1951
- Nana Bastrup (born 1987), Danish visual artist, student from 2010 to 2015
- Wilhelm Bauche (1899–1959), graphic artist, student from 1916 to 1917
- Iris Berben (born 1950), actress, student from 1966 to 1969
- Liebfriede Bernstiel (1915–1998), ceramicist, student from 1933 to 1934
- Marie Minna Bielenberg (1897–1983), potter and painter, student from 1919 to 1921
- Elise Blumann (1897–1990), German-Australian expressionist painter, student from 1919 to 1922
- Antoinette de Boer (born 1939), textile and fiber artist, student from 1957 to 1961
- Henry Boothby (1891–?), artist, student from 1909 to 1914
- Norbert Bork (1913–1993), sculptor and graphic artist, student from 1940 to 1943
- Holger Börnsen (1931–2019), graphic artist, designer and illustrator, student from 1952 to 1956
- Jens Dieter Brandes (born 1925), artist, student from 1942 to 1944
- Matthias Brandes (born 1950), painter, student from 1969 to 1975
- Bettina Brendel (1922–2009), German-American painter and filmmaker, student from 1946 to 1948
- Heinrich Gerhard Bücker (1922–2008), sculptor, painter and calligrapher, student from 1946 to 1947
- Annette Caspar (1916–2008), British-German painter, printmaker and ceramicist, student from 1933 to 1934
- Rolf Diener (1906–1988), painter, draftsman and graphic artist, student from 1927 to 1931
- Sabine von Diest-Brackenhausen (born 1931), sculptor and painter, student from 1956 to 1958
- Jürgen von Dückerhoff (born 1973), visual artist, student from 1997 to 2004
- Paul Dunkelmann (1905–?), artist, student from 1930 to 1935
- Heilwig Duwe-Ploog (1924–2013), painter
- Karl Heinz Engelin (1924–1986), sculptor, student in 1954
- Albert Feser (1901–1993), painter and art educator, student from 1930 to 1931
- Jochen Flinzer (born 1959), conceptual artist, student from 1977 to 1982
- Karl Frenkel (died 1943), artist, student until 1943
- Alexander Friedrich (1895–1968), etcher, printmaker and mosaic artist, student from 1914 to 1918
- Max Frisinger (born 1980), painter and installation artist, student from 2006 to 2010
- Rolf Gith (born 1950), painter, draftsman and designer, student from 1968 to 1974
- Anna Gottburgsen (1896–1988), painter, student from 1925 to 1926
- Dora Grabosch (1916–1994), painter, student from 1948 to 1952
- Eve Gramatzki (1935–2003), graphic artist
- Bernd Grimm (born 1962), architectural model maker and artist, student from 1983 to 1989
- Elma Grohs-Hansen (1892–1981), sculptor and textile artist, student from 1911 to 1914
- Karl Gröning (1897–1980), stage designer and painter, student from 1915 to 1918
- Grete Gross (1890–?), graphic artist, student from 1911 to 1919
- Guðný Guðmundsdóttir (born 1970), Icelandic artist, student from 1995 to 2001
- Therese Hallinger (1909–2001), craftswoman and art educator
- Ingeborg Hansen (1934–2016), painter and art educator, student from 1955 to 1960
- Klaus Hartmann (born 1969), painter, student from 1991 to 1997
- Gertrud von Hassel (1908–1999), painter and educator, student from 1928 to 1933
- Ivo Hauptmann (1886–1973), painter
- Paul Helms (1884–1961), painter, graphic artist and professor, student from 1907 to 1908
- Bernd Hering (1924–2013), painter, student from 1945 to 1950
- Karl Holstein (1908–1983), artist
- Martin Irwahn (1898–1981), painter and sculptor, student from 1911 to 1917 and in 1940
- Heino Jaeger (1938–1997), painter, graphic artist and satirist, student from 1956 to 1961
- Maximilian Jahns (1887–1957), painter, student from 1907 to 1913
- Christian Jankowski (born 1968), conceptual and video artist
- Fritz Jansen (1892–1974), painter, student from 1919 to 1924
- Margrit Kahl (born 1942), conceptual artist
- Bruno Karberg (1896–1967), graphic designer and painter, student from 1916 to 1917
- Eva Kausche-Kongsbak (1918–2010), book illustrator, painter and author, student from 1936 to 1939
- Annette Kelm (born 1975), contemporary photographer
- Sophia Kennedy (born 1989), American-German musician and composer
- Bernhard Klein (1888–1967), painter, graphic artist and stage designer, student from 1908 to 1912
- Gisela Kleinschmidt (1926–1997), watercolor painter, student from 1948 to 1950
- Ulrich Köhler (born 1969), film director
- Reinhard Komar (born 1950), artist, student from 1972 to 1976
- Nina Könnemann (born 1971), filmmaker and video artist, student from 1992 to 1998
- Michael Kress (born 1964), conceptual and media artist, student from 1986 to 1993
- Fifi Kreutzer (1891–1977), painter and craftswoman
- Carlo Kriete (1924–1989), painter, graphic artist and draftsman, student from 1945 to 1948
- Hans Joachim Kröger (1910–?), artist, student from 1935 to 1939
- Karl Heinz Kröger (1914–?), graphic artist, student from 1934 to 1940
- Erwin Krubeck (1897–1967), graphic artist and professor, student from 1921 to 1927
- Gisela Kühler-Balcke (1913–1983), sculptor, student from 1933 to 1943
- Fritz Kühner (1910–?), painter
- Konrad A. Lattner (1896–1979), painter, student from 1913 to 1914 and 1917 to 1920
- Nele Lipp (born 1948), interdisciplinary artist and art therapist, student from 1968 to 1969 and 1970 to 1975
- Erich Lossie (1886–1944), sculptor, student from 1908 to 1911
- Peter Luksch (born 1934), sculptor
- Peter Marggraf (born 1947), sculptor, printmaker and book artist
- MatWay (Matvey Slavin, born 1987), painter and graphic artist, student from 2011 to 2015
- Jan-Holger Mauss (born 1963), conceptual artist, student from 1990 to 1995
- Pauline M'barek (born 1979), conceptual artist, graduated in 2007
- Birgit Megerle (born 1975), painter, student from 1997 to 2002
- Jörg Meier (born 1950), photographer and artist, student from 1969 to 1974
- Adolf Meyer (1881–1929), architect and designer, student from 1912 to 1913
- Nanne Meyer (born 1953), drawing artist, illustrator and professor, student from 1974 to 1981
- Monika Michalko (born 1982), painter, student from 2003 to 2009
- Marlene Moeschke-Poelzig (1894–1985), sculptor and architect, student from 1911 to 1917
- Vera Möller (1911–1998), painter, illustrator and author
- Mariella Mosler (born 1962), installation artist
- Herbert Müller-Fried (1912–2007), graphic artist and painter, student from 1934 to 1937
- Peter Nagel (born 1941), painter and sculptor, student from 1960 to 1965
- Ramon Neckelmann (1907–2000), painter and graphic artist, student from 1927 to 1928
- Max Erich Nicola (1889–1958), painter and graphic artist
- Werner Nöfer (born 1937), painter and graphic artist, student from 1959 to 1963
- Felix Nussbaum (1904–1944), surrealist painter, student from 1922 to 1923
- Anna Oppermann (1940–1993), conceptual artist, student from 1962 to 1968
- Wolfgang Oppermann (1937–2001), painter, printmaker and sculptor, student from 1959 to 1962
- Trude Petri (1906–1998), porcelain designer and sculptor, student from 1925 to 1927
- Theodor Piering (1882–1964), painter and graphic artist
- Wolfgang Pohl (born 1943), sculptor, painter and graphic artist, student from 1969 to 1971
- Virgil Popp (1896–1973), painter, student from 1913 to 1914 and 1919 to 1923
- Volker Prauß (born 1943), artist, student from 1967 to 1972
- Roswitha Quadflieg (born 1949), book designer, illustrator and writer, student from 1973 to 1974
- Ursula Querner (1921–1969), sculptor, student from 1946 to 1949
- Otto Rahm (1904–1994), expressionist painter and sculptor, student from 1923
- Elisabeth Rapp (born 1956), artist, student from 1982 to 1987
- Gerda Maria Raschke (born 1944), painter and glass artist
- Horst-Hagen Rath (born 1946), artist, student from 1970 to 1977
- Werner Rebhuhn (1922–2001), commercial graphic artist, student from 1940 to 1944
- Albert Christoph Reck (1922–2019), painter and graphic artist, student from 1948 to 1951
- Dominik Reding (born 1969), film director and screenwriter, student from 1992 to 1998
- Johanna Reich (born 1977), video and media artist
- Otto Rodewald (1891–1960), painter and graphic artist, student from 1912 to 1914
- Helmut Scaruppe (1925–2018), painter, sculptor and writer, student from 1942 to 1943
- Christoph Schäfer (born 1964), conceptual and drawing artist
- Gertrud Schaeffer (1892–1960), painter and graphic artist
- Jenny Schäfer (born 1985), visual artist and author, student from 2008 to 2015
- Paul Schaeffer (1882–?), artist
- Heinrich Schilinzky (1923–2009), Baltic-German painter, graphic artist and sculptor, student from 1947
- Frieder Schlaich (born 1961), film director and producer, student from 1985 to 1991
- Annie Schmahl (1890–?), artist, student from 1911 to 1918
- Hildi Schmidt-Heins (1915–2011), painter, sculptor and photographer, student from 1934 to 1938
- Gregor Schneider (born 1969), sculptor and installation artist, student from 1991 to 1992
- Dennis Scholl (born 1980), visual artist, student from 2002 to 2007
- Ilse Schröder (1896–?), artist, student from 1915 to 1919
- Carl Schümann (1901–1974), sculptor
- Martin Schwemer (1910–1989), painter and graphic artist
- Markus Selg (born 1974), multimedia and installation artist
- Ivan Seligmann (1896–?), artist, student in 1914
- Wiebke Siem (born 1954), sculptor and installation artist, student from 1979 to 1984
- Herbert Spangenberg (1907–1984), painter, student from 1926 to 1928
- Ragna Sperschneider (1928–2003), goldsmith and enamel artist, student from 1951 to 1956
- Dorothea Stefula-Hüter (1914–1997), painter and weaver
- Rolf Stehr (1911–?), artist, student from 1930 to 1935
- Anita Suhr (1900–1991), painter, student from c. 1918 to 1922
- Stuart Sutcliffe (1940–1962), Scottish painter and original bassist for the Beatles, student from 1961 to 1962
- Sophie Taeuber-Arp (1889–1943), Swiss artist, painter, sculptor and dancer, student in 1912
- Hugo Taglang (1874–1944), graphic designer, student from 1889 to 1892
- Wilhelm Tegtmeier (1895–1968), painter and graphic artist, student from 1918
- Ilse Thieme (1896–?), artist, student from 1915 to 1918
- Mildred Thompson (1936–2003), American abstract painter, printmaker and sculptor, student from 1958 to 1961
- Willi Titze (1890–1979), painter and graphic artist, student from 1908 to 1912
- Gerd Uschkereit (born 1926), painter, student from 1951 to 1955
- Wilhelm Viehmann (1886–1966), painter
- Anne-Marie Vogler (1892–1983), sculptor and graphic artist, student from 1916 to 1918
- Harald Vogts (born 1937), artist
- Asta Vorsteher (1921–2006), weaver and textile artist
- Thomas Wachweger (1943–2015), painter and artist, student from 1963 to 1970
- Claus Wallner (1926–1979), painter and stained-glass artist, student from 1948 to 1951
- Eva Maria Walther (1892–?), artist, student from 1909 to 1911
- Petrus Wandrey (1939–2012), digital artist, sculptor and painter, student from 1963 to 1968
- Jakob Wechsler (1912–1995), Israeli painter, student from 1930 to 1933
- Ebba Weddig-Dettenberg (1908–?), painter and graphic artist, student from 1928 to 1933
- Annette Wehrmann (1961–2010), conceptual and performance artist, student from 1985 to 1993
- Ralf Weißleder (born 1958), artist and publisher, student from 1982 to 1992
- Nicole Wermers (born 1971), sculptor and installation artist, Turner Prize nominee, graduated in 1997
- Gerhard West (1922–2006), painter and art educator
- Marianne Wex (1937–2020), feminist photographer, artist and author
- Bernhard Winking (born 1934), architect and professor, student from 1961
- Uli Winters (born 1965), media artist and author, graduated in 1999
- Hartmut Wöhlbier (born 1964), artist, student from 1992 to 2001
- Niko Wölk (born 1962), artist
- Harry Wolfrath (1916–?), artist, student in 1945
- Xu Jiang (born 1955), Chinese painter and president of the China Academy of Art
- Otto Ziller (1889–1958), architect, student before 1919

== Notable academic staff ==
This list includes present and past academic staff, listed by last name alphabetical order.

- Friedrich Adler (1878–1942), design, metalwork
- Joseph Beuys, guest professor in 1974
- Max Bill (1908–1994), professor from 1967 to 1974
- Bazon Brock, professor 1965–1976
- Adam Broomberg and Oliver Chanarin, photography
- Bernhard Blume, professor 1987–2011
- Angela Bulloch, sculpture
- John Burgan, guest professor 2002
- Carl Otto Czeschka, professor 1907–1943
- Thomas Demand, sculpture
- Simon Denny, time-based media
- Cyprien Gaillard, sculpture
- Gotthard Graubner, professor 1969–
- Rudolf Hausner, professor
- Alfred Hrdlicka, professor 1973–1975
- Friedensreich Hundertwasser, professor 1959
- Jutta Koether, painting
- Isaac Julien, professor 2006
- Sigmar Polke, professor
- Dieter Rams, professor 1981−1997
- Anselm Reyle, professor
- Helke Sander, professor 1981–2003
- Edwin Scharff
- Paul Schneider-Esleben, professor 1961–1972
- Paul Wunderlich, professor 1963–1968
- Carl Vogel, professor 1962–1989, president 1976–1989
- Jorinde Voigt, professor, painting/drawing
- Friedrich Ahlers-Hestermann, director 1946–1951
- Fatih Akin, student 1994–2000, guest professor 2005–2006
- Lothar Baumgarten, guest professor
- Willy von Beckerath, 1907–1930
- Johann Michael Bossard, sculptor, 1906–1944
- KP Brehmer (Klaus Peter Brehmer), 1971–1997
- Pepe Danquart, professor of documentary film 2008–2022
- Hanne Darboven, student 1962–1965, honorary professor 2000–2009
- Bogomir Ecker, 1993–2002
- Dan Graham, guest professor 1989–1993
- Jörg Immendorff, guest professor 1982
- Jürgen Klauke, 1980–1981
- Kurt Kranz, 1950–1972
- Vlado Kristl
- Richard Luksch, 1907–1936
- Gerhard Marcks, 1945–1950
- Almir Mavignier, painter, 1965–1990
- Wilfried Minks, professor of stage design 1967–1995
- Matt Mullican, professor of time-based media 2009–2018
- Werner Nekes, 1969–1972
- Marjetica Potrč, professor of social design 2011–2018
- Peter Raacke, professor of industrial design 1968–1993
- Gerhard Rühm, 1972–1995
- Thomas Scheibitz, guest professor
- Gregor Schneider, guest professor 2000–2002
- Karl Schneider, architect, 1930–1933
- Gustav Seitz, sculptor, 1958–1969
- Wiebke Siem, guest professor 2000–2001, sculpture 2002–2008
- Wolfgang Tillmans, guest professor 1998–1999
- Joe Tilson, guest professor 1971–1972
- Heinz Trökes, head of the department of free graphic arts 1956–1958
- Wolfgang Tümpel, Bauhaus designer (1903–1978)
- Franz Erhard Walther, professor 1971–2005
- Ludwig Wilding, professor 1969–1992
- Haegue Yang, guest professor of sculpture 2009–2010
