= Ignatz Wiemeler =

- Born: 3 October 1895; Ibbenbüren, German Empire
- Died: 25 May 1952; Hamburg, West Germany
- Known for: bookbinder, rare book
- Movement: Offenbach School

Ignatz Wiemeler (1895–1952) was a German bookbinder and educator, internationally known and exhibited. He was part of the Offenbach School movement, alongside Rudolf Koch and the painter Karl Friedrich Lippmann.

== Biography ==
Wiemeler was born on 3 October 1895 in Ibbenbüren, Germany, his father was a bookbinder. He studied at University of Fine Arts of Hamburg (Hamburg Landeskunstschule), under teachers Franz Weisse, Anton Kling, and with Carl Otto Czeschka. From 1914 until 1916, he had military service and was severely injured.

From 1921 until 1925, Wiemeler taught bookbinding at Technische Lehranstalten Offenbach (now known as Hochschule für Gestaltung Offenbach am Main). In 1925, he started teaching at Leipzig State Academy for the Book Trade and Graphic Arts (Akademie für graphische Künste und Buchgewerbe) and left during World War II. He was the head of bookbinding classes at Landeskunstschule Lerchenfeld (now known as University of Fine Arts of Hamburg) in Hamburg until his early death in 1952.

He was a founding member of Bund Meister der Einbandkunst (Association of Master Bookbinding Designers). Students of his included Arno Werner, Polly Lada-Mocarski, and others.

In 1935, he had a solo exhibition at the Museum of Modern Art (MoMA) in New York City, Ignatz Wiemeler: Modern Bookbinder. Additional he had solo exhibitions in the 1930s at Columbia University, and Harvard University.

He died on 25 May 1952 in Hamburg, West Germany.

== See also ==
- Offenbach am Main
