= Polly Lada-Mocarski =

American rare book scholar (1902–1997)

Polly Lada-Morcarski
- Born: Laura Mitchell Klots; November 1, 1902; Scranton, Pennsylvania, United States
- Died: September 5, 1997 (aged 94); Hamden, Connecticut, United States
- Resting place: Woodlawn Cemetery
- Other names: Laura K. Lada-Morcarski, Laura Klots
- Education: Hochschule für Grafik und Buchkunst Leipzig
- Spouse: Valerian Lada-Mocarski (m. 1924; died 1971)

Laura "Polly" Lada-Mocarski (born Laura Mitchell Klots; 1 November 1902 – 5 September 1997) was an American craftsperson, rare book scholar, bookbinder, book preservationist, educator, and the inventor of the PolyCase, an exhibition display for old and rare books. She served as faculty in the Graphic Arts Department at Yale University.

== Early life and education ==
Laura Mitchell Klots was born on November 1, 1902, in Scranton, Pennsylvania, to Bertha Louise (née Ives) and Walter James Klots. Her family was upper middle class silk manufacturers, of the Klots Throwing Company of Lonaconing in Maryland (which later became part of Gentex Corporation). She attended boarding schools in Washington, D.C., and Paris.

In 1919, she met her future husband in Paris, Valerian "Valla" Lada-Mocarski, the son of a Czarist general, Ludwig Viktor Lada-Mocarsky (1854–1917), he had escaped before the Russian Revolution. They were married in 1924. Valla collected rare books, and around the time of their marriage he started his collection of Russian Alaska and early Russian Travel books published before 1868, and Polly started to learn how to do rare book bookbinding, repairs, and conservation.

The couple moved to Berlin, where her husband Valla was working. She received a formal education in bookbinding at the State Academy of Graphic Arts (Hochschule für Grafik und Buchkunst Leipzig) in Leipzig, studying under Ignatz Wiemeler. The couple travelled through Europe, and Lada-Mocarski would study bookbinding at every opportunity. Additionally she studied bookbinding and book restoration under Douglas Cockerell at his studio in Letchworth.

== Work ==
They settled in New York City after World War 2. In 1960, the couple settled down in New Haven, Connecticut near Yale University, where she lived for 30 years. Lada-Mocarski taught bookbinding to students of graphic design by the Graphic Arts Department at Yale, and she was the first female faculty. In the 1960s, Lada-Mocarski was involved with the American Crafts Council and the World Crafts Council, and served as a writer and bookbinding editor for Crafts Horizons magazine.

In 1971, her husband Valla died. After his death, Lada-Mocarski shifted her attention to the Book Conservation Studio at Yale University's Sterling Memorial Library, where she worked for many years. She helped establish the bookbinding courses at Creative Arts Workshop, in New Haven.

She was an active member of the Grolier Club, and she was a founding board member of the Center for Book Arts.

Lada-Mocarski was having a problem in the exhibition of books, and as a result, in 1982 Polly designed, patented and manufactured the PolyCase, an elegant, lightweight, demountable Lucite exhibition case. The patent for PolyCase was awarded in 1985, when Lada-Mocarski was in her 80s.

She died at Arden House in Hamden, Connecticut on September 5, 1997, her memorial service was at St. John's Episcopal Church in New Haven.
