= Paul Wunderlich =

German artist

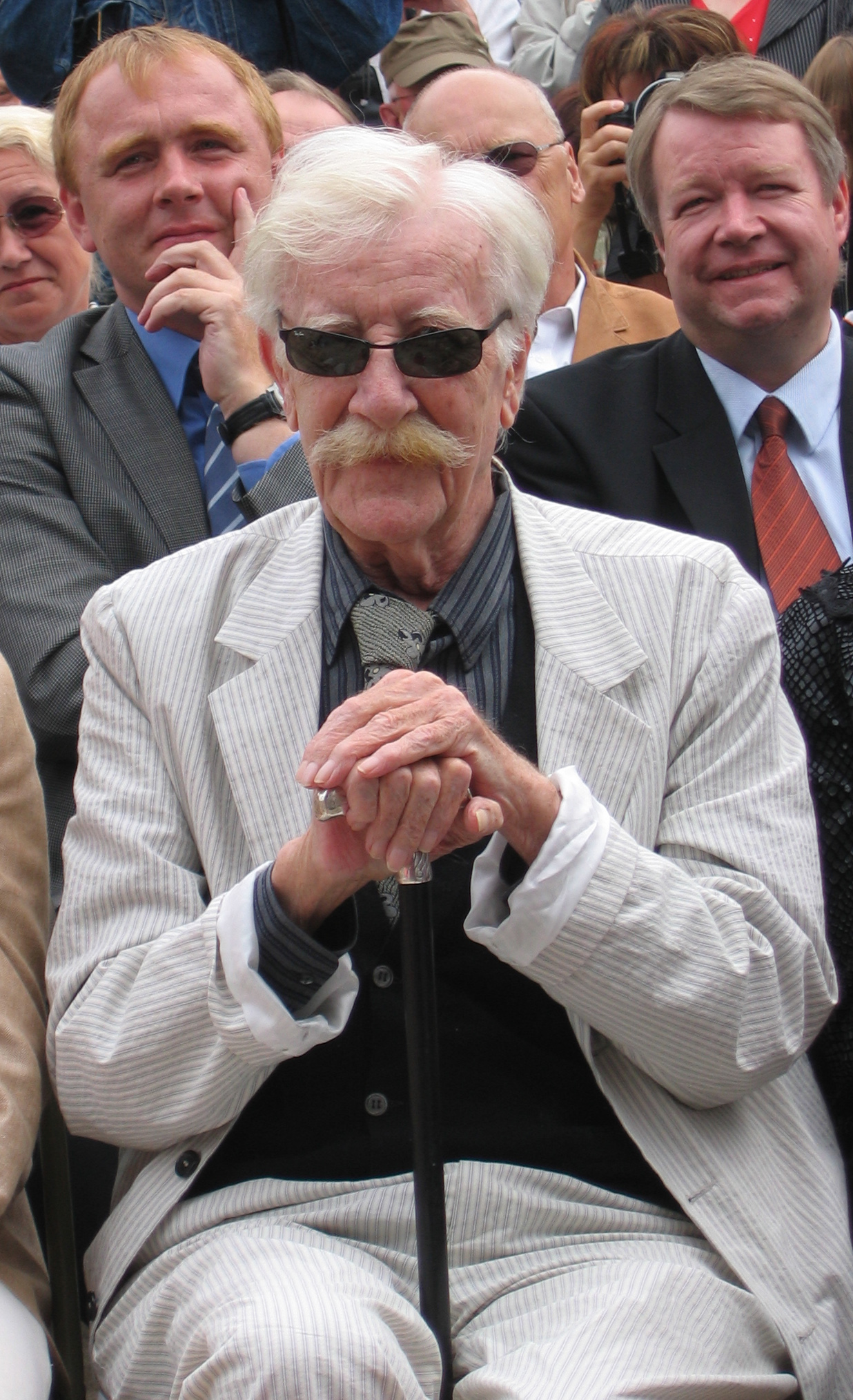
Paul Wunderlich 2007

Paul Wunderlich (10 March 1927 in Eberswalde – 6 June 2010 in Saint-Pierre-de-Vassols) was a German painter, sculptor and graphic artist. He designed Surrealist paintings and erotic sculptures. He often created paintings which referred to mythological legends.

== Background ==
Wunderlich was the second child of Horst and Gertrude (née Arendt) Wunderlich. After a time as Flakhelfer and a prisoner of war, he moved to his mother in Eutin, graduated from the Johann Heinrich Voss Gymnasium, and then visited the Palace School of Art in the Orangery of Eutin Castle. In 1947 he became a student at the Landeskunstschule in Hamburg, where he was in the Free Graphics class of William Tietze. His classmates included Horst Janssen and Reinhard Drenkhahn. After a hiatus, Wunderlich began studying again in 1950 with Willem Grimm and graduated in 1951. He then worked as a lecturer at the Hochschule für bildende Künste Hamburg, teaching lithography and etching. Also in 1951 he printed for Emil Nolde ("The King and his men", etching) and in 1952 for Oskar Kokoschka, the graphics suite "Ann Eliza Reed" of eleven lithographs. With the earnings he spent three months in Ibiza. In 1955 he received a scholarship from the Cultural Committee of German Industry .

After an early, essentially realistic creative period from around 1959, he developed his characteristic style. His early works show a dismembered body, disproportioned in front of an empty background. In the 1960s he was influenced by art movements such as Art Deco and Art Nouveau.

In 1960, the cycle of lithographs "qui s'explique" was seized by the Hamburg prosecutor for indecent depictions. Wunderlich received the 1961 Prize of the Youth for graphics. With the prize money, he moved to Paris. In 1962, he worked in the workshop Deskjoberts in Paris.

In 1963 he returned to Hamburg and as a successor of George Gresko was professor at the Hochschule until 1968. In 1969 he started the creation of bronze sculptures and statues, influenced by Salvador Dalí. In 1976, he issued a limited edition of multicolored heliographs that illustrated James Joyce's Giacomo Joyce.

Wunderlich destroyed some of his art after having spent some time on it. He had looked at it and decided he no longer liked it. At another time his art had gotten him in trouble, officials came knocking on his door and ruined years worth of his work for being too strange.

== Personal life ==
Paul Wunderlich married photographer Karin Székessy in 1971, and the couple pursued art projects together. Fritz J. Raddatz documented and wrote comments on his work.

Wunderlich lived and worked in Hamburg and Saint-Pierre-de-Vassols (Provence).

== Death ==
Wunderlich died in Provence on 6 June 2010 at the age of 83.
