= Herbert Niebling =

Designer of lace knitting patterns (b. 1903, d. 1966)

- Born: 20 December 1903
- Died: 15 May 1966 (aged 62)
- Education: University of Fine Arts of Hamburg

Herbert Niebling (20 December 1903 – 15 May 1966) was a master designer of the style of lace knitting called Kunststricken (art-knitting). Today, his designs remain popular with lace knitting enthusiasts.

== Style ==
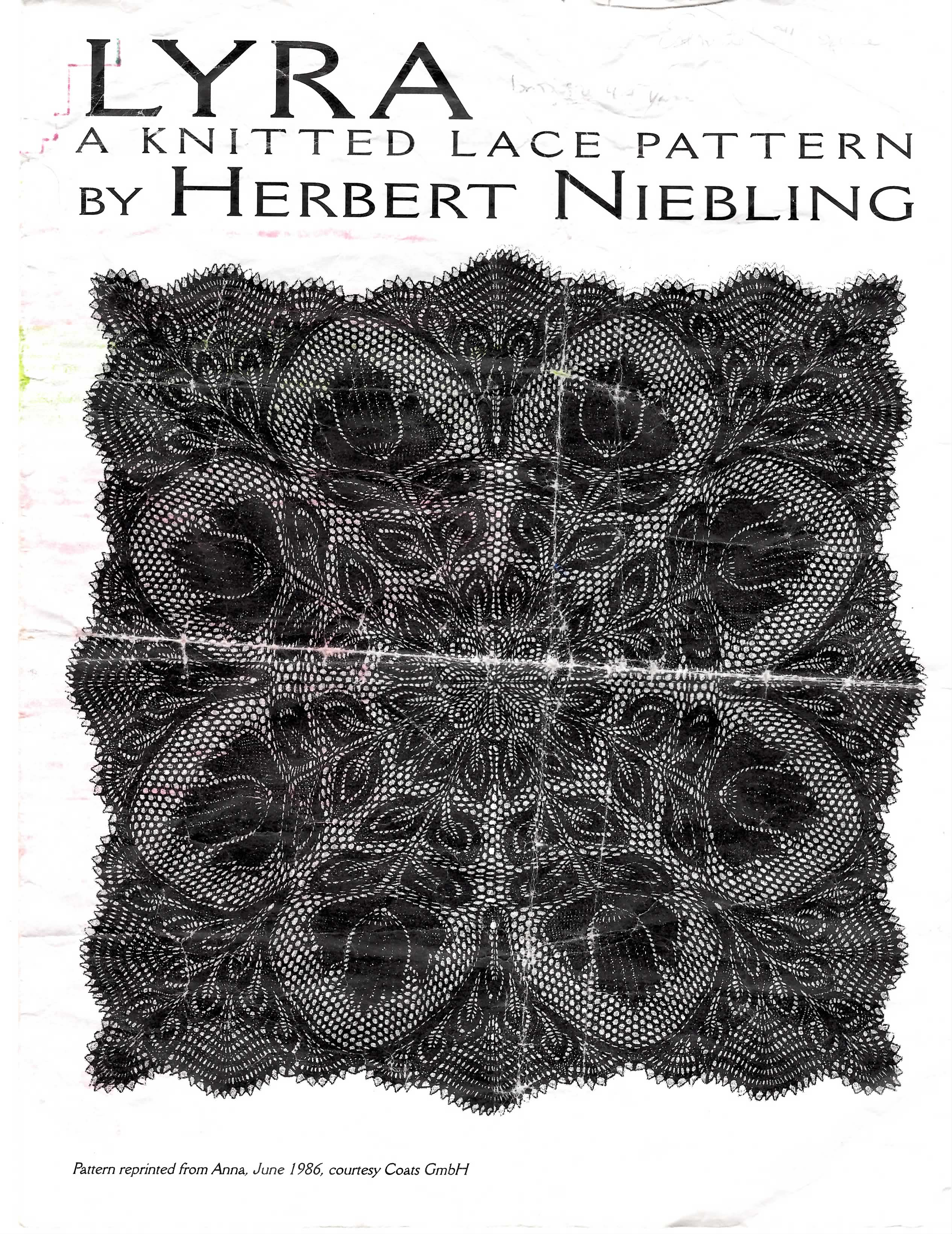
Lyra pattern cover by Herbert Niebling

Herbert Niebling developed his style from working lace patterns disseminated in magazines and leaflets he read as a young boy. The first one he was exposed to was a design by Marie Niedner and Gussi von Reden published by Otto Beyer in 1921 as Band 46: Kunst-Stricken I. The designs of that time were geometric spirals and motifs which could be replicated and expanded to create a kaleidoscope effect. In contrast, Niebling's own later designs were not simply repetitive and geometric, but contained concentrated waves of increases and decreases to create fluid shapes portraying leaves and flowers.

Although much of his early work resembles the geometric style of his predecessors, Niebling’s most notable pieces are those featuring botanically accurate flower and leaf forms worked in highly textured stitches and twining against a background of mesh stitches. These pieces resemble the “true” needle and bobbin laces of earlier centuries with their densely worked floral motifs, often outlined in bolder threadwork and embellished with textural ornaments, set against a background of braided mesh (in bobbin lace) or connected by a network of bars or brides (in needle lace).

He drew constant inspiration from nature. During his frequent travels, he would collect plants from foreign countries and transform their blossoms and leaves into delicate lace pictures. His ability to construct a knitting pattern working directly from live flowers without having to sketch the image first was a key part of his continuing creative achievement.

Niebling produced hundreds of knitted lace designs over the 40-plus years of his career. His patterns were published in magazines throughout Europe. Niebling himself knitted samples of his designs using special long steel double-pointed needles and extra fine cotton threads which are no longer available. "His finest work was a tablecloth measuring about 39 inches (100 cm) square and weighing only about an ounce (30 g) that could be drawn through a finger ring."

== Development of pattern symbols ==
In addition to mastering a new style of knit lace, Niebling also worked with his publisher in the 1930s to develop a set of universal symbols to represent the individual stitches in lace patterns which enabled an entire row of stitches to be read at a glance. This allowed the patterns to be more comprehensible and bring a wider readership for his publications. Publisher Aenne Burda purchased the Beyer publishing rights in 1963, and still uses the chart symbols Niebling originally developed.

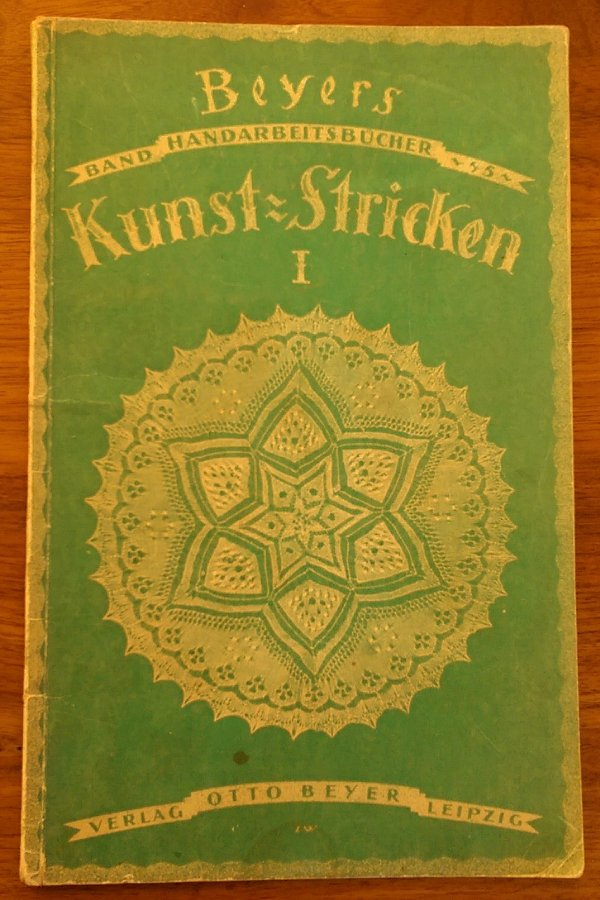
Cover of Beyers Handarbeitsbücher, Band 45: Kunst-Stricken I by Marie Niedner and Gussi Von Reden

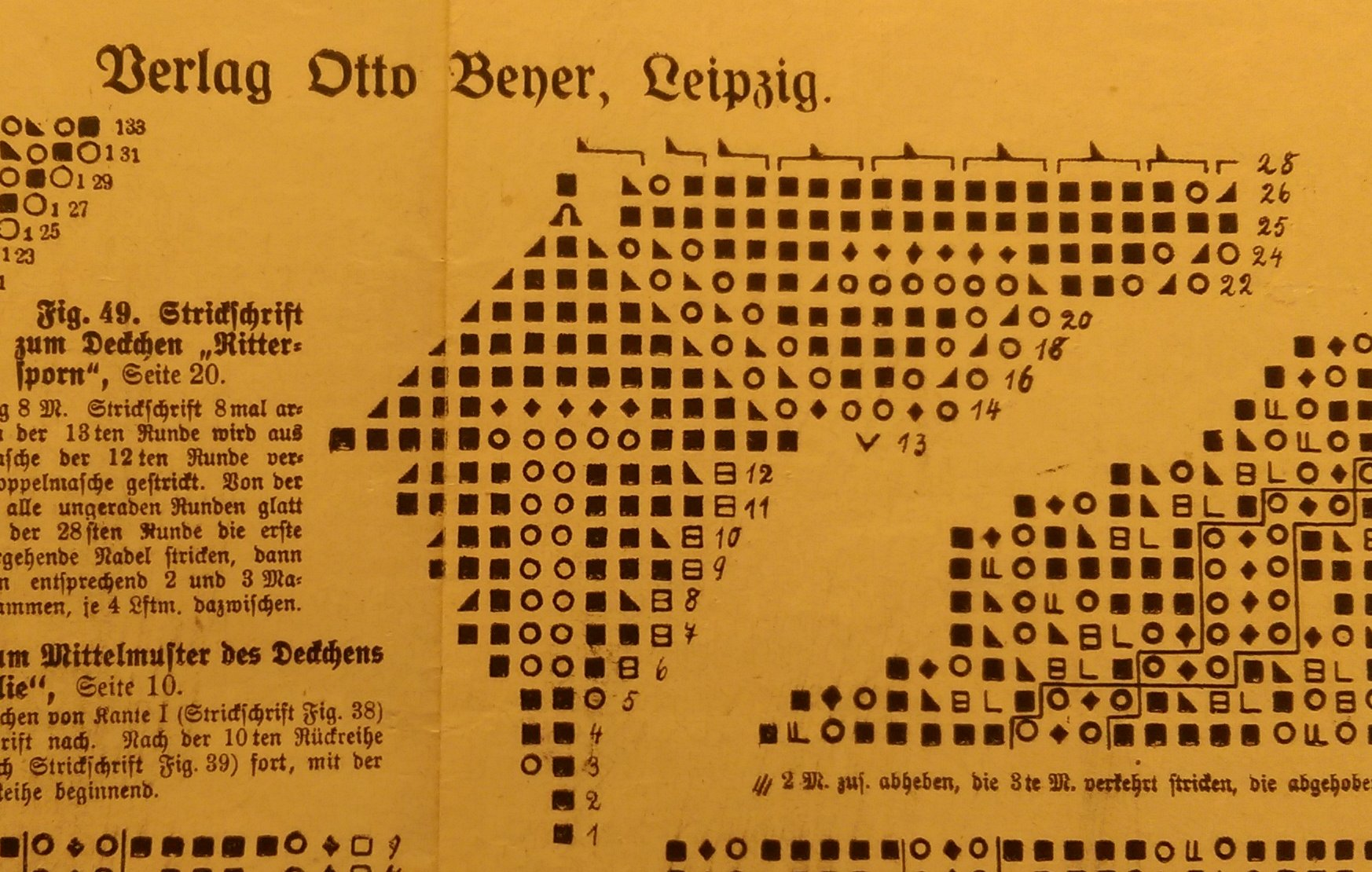
Page from Beyers Handarbeitsbücher, Band 45: Kunst-Stricken I showing what the pattern symbols looked like in the 1920s

Hand-drawn chart made by Niebling circa 1963. Later published as pattern 418/43 "Filigrane Spitzenblüte" by Burda

Side-by-side comparison of knitting chart symbols (hand-drawn vs. printed) for the pattern 418/43 "Filigrane Spitzenblüte"

Description and image of "Filigrane Spitzenblüte" as published in Burda E418

== Early life and education ==
Born in the German town of Averlak, in the northern state of Schleswig-Holstein, to George Franz Niebling (Kanalmeister and one of the engineers in the construction of the Kiel canal) and Bertha Baschin, he learned to knit as a young boy from reading lace patterns found in leaflets of that time. By the age of six he was knitting his own stockings, and by the time he went to school, he was skilled enough to give knitting lessons to his classmates. During World War I, he knit many stockings to send to the troops on the front lines.

As a nine-year-old, he created a piece of gobelin embroidery directly from a postcard reproduction of an old master painting without first having re-drawn it into a pattern template. He designed his first knitted lace doilies soon after. He went on to attend the University of Fine Arts of Hamburg, where he studied a variety of crafts during his 4-year apprenticeship, ranging from ceramics to tapestry. Nevertheless, it was at knitting design that he most excelled. He published his first knit lace patterns with Otto Beyer in the early 1930s. Publications from 1936 list his residence as Itzehoe.

== Later life ==
He married Olga Linda Zehring on 27 July 1935 in Brandis. The couple lived in Itzehoe from 1935 to 1940, at which time Niebling was drafted to serve in the German army during the second World War. After returning home from a prisoner of war camp in June 1945, he and his wife made their home in Bensheim. He began publishing lace patterns inspired by the flowers in his garden, and was known as the "Spitzenkönig von der Bergstraße" (King of Lace from the Bergstraße).

In February 1957, Niebling and his wife moved to Freiburg. In his studio he also made shawls for Valais costumes, as well as Spanish mantillas and lace hats for the Sunday best of the peasant women in the Bretagne. He died on 15 May 1966 in Freiburg.

== Enduring popularity ==
Herbert Niebling's designs have remained popular in the modern day, although amassing a complete catalogue of his work has been difficult as some of his patterns have been published without attribution. The social knitting site Ravelry currently lists 440 different knitting patterns designed by Niebling with many thousands of individual projects inspired by those designs posted by their users. The Herbert Niebling enthusiast group on Ravelry was founded in 2007 and has over 3,000 members as of 2019.

== Gallery ==
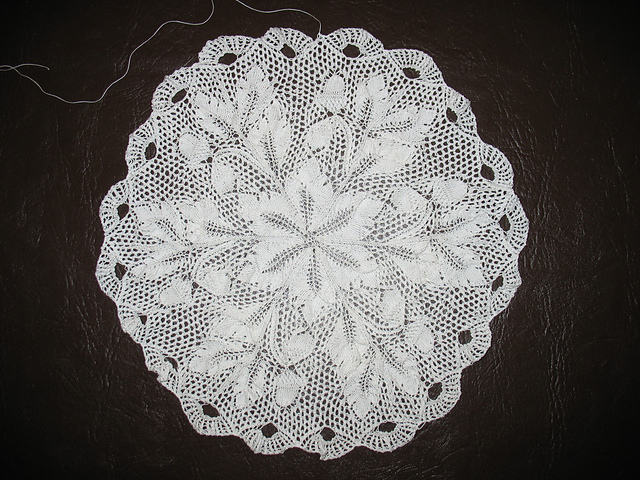
Eichelwald doily designed by Herbert Niebling

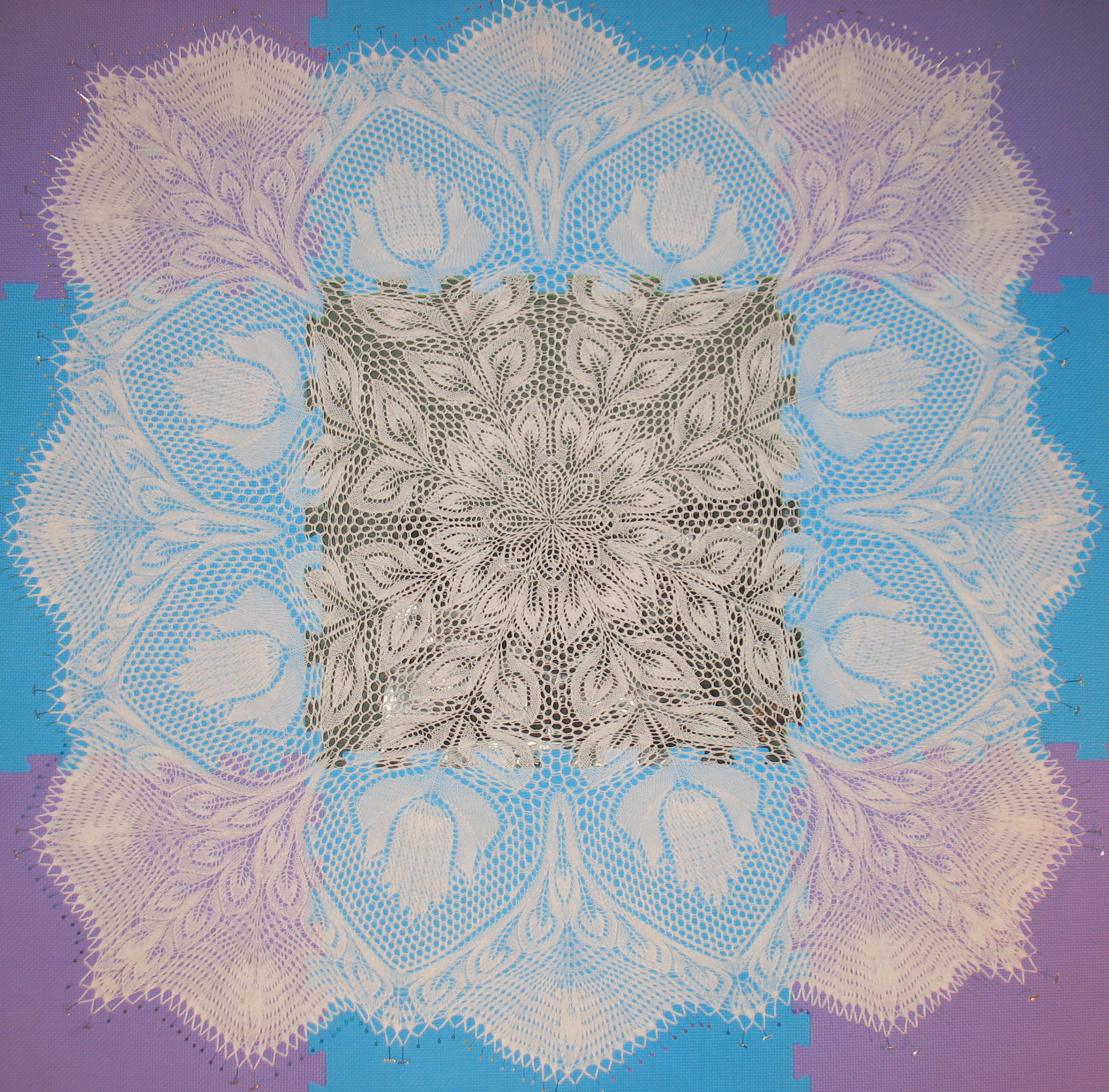
Knitted lace tablecloth based on the pattern "Lyra" by Herbert Niebling

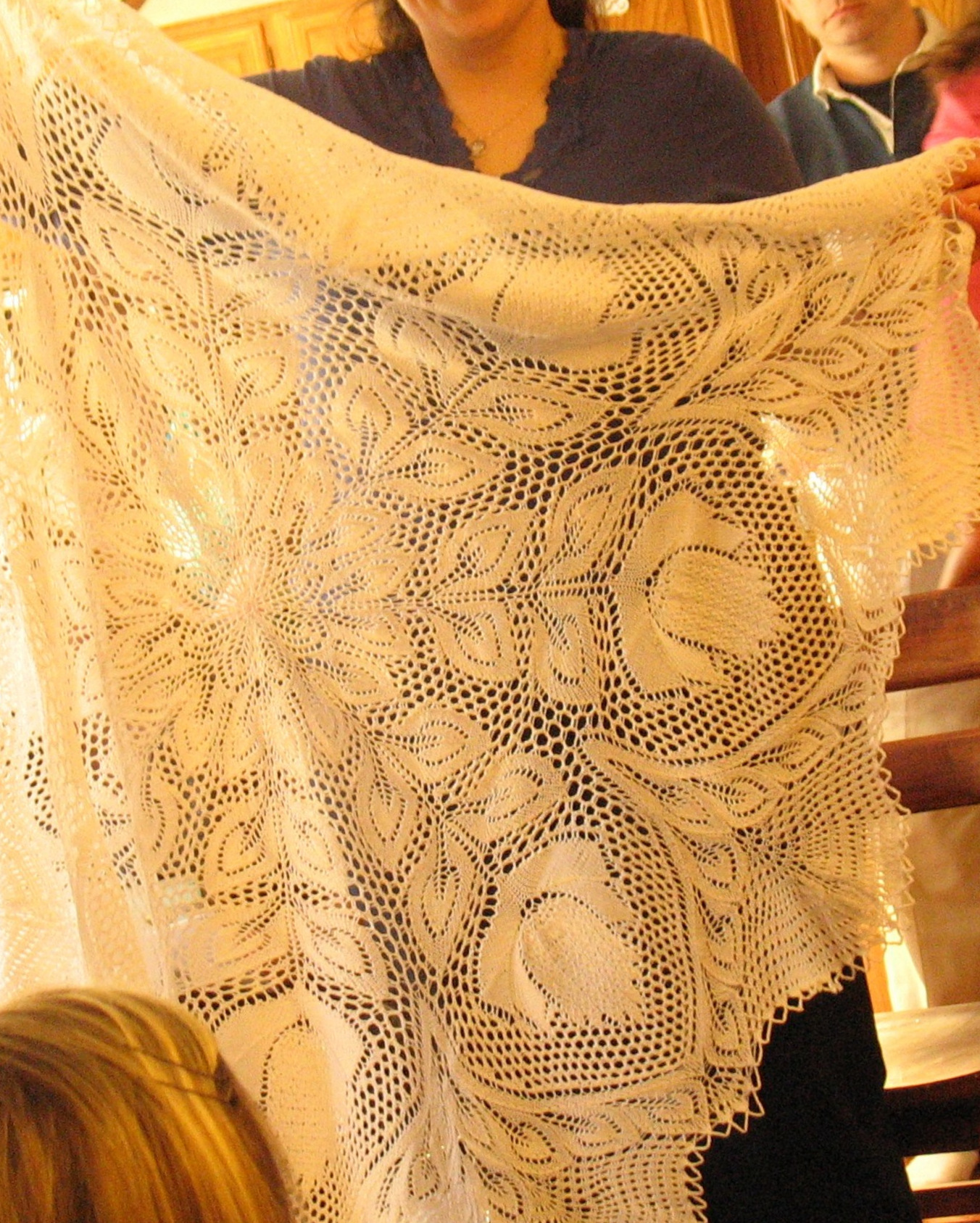
Knitted lace tablecloth based on the pattern "Lyra" by Herbert Niebling
