= Nanne (surname) =

Nanne is a surname. Notable people with the surname include:

- Edgar Nanne (born 1952), Guatemalan rower
- Lou Nanne (born 1941), American ice hockey player and general manager
- Marty Nanne (born 1967), American ice hockey player, son of Lou

== See also ==
- Nanne (given name)
- Nannes
