= Nanne Meyer =

German artist

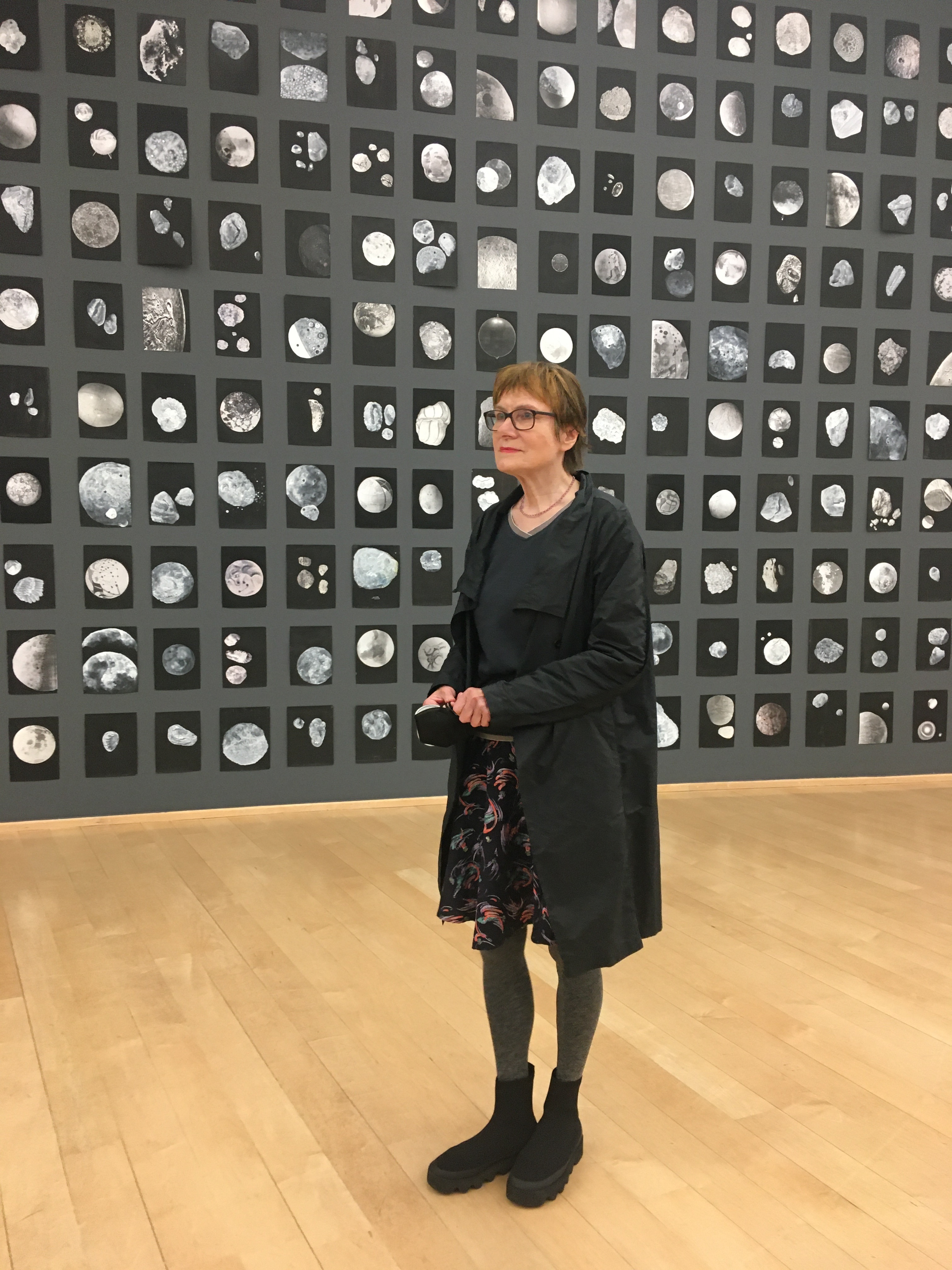
- Born: 12 April 1953 (age 73); Hamburg, Germany
- Occupation: Artist

Nanne Meyer (born 12 April 1953 in Hamburg), is a German artist. She is one of the first women artists of the postwar generation who works primarily in drawing. Meyer lives and works in Berlin.

Papierperspektive, 2010, Color- and Lead-Pencils, Ink on Paper, 70x100cm

== Biography ==
Meyer was born in Hamburg and studied from 1974 to 1981 at the Hochschule für bildende Künste Hamburg with Gerhard Rühm and Tomas Schmit. After completing the I. Staatsexam, in 1982 she was awarded a DAAD Stipend in London, where she studied animation at the Saint Martins School of Art. In 1986–87 she was awarded the German Rome Prize, a one-year stipend at the Deutsche Akademie Villa Massimo, after which she lived in Frankfurt/Main for several years. In 1993 she moved to Berlin, where since 1994 she teaches as professor at the Kunsthochschule Berlin-Weißensee. In 2013 she received the women artists' prize NRW for drawing and in 2014 the Hannah-Höch Preis in Berlin.

== Work ==
Nanne Meyer's artwork is directly linked to her own personal process of seeing, experiencing and reflecting upon the world, mediated through an experimental sensibility.

Already during her studies, in the 1970s, Meyer placed an emphasis on working in the drawing medium, seeking out connections to the activities of thinking and writing. In making small-format booklets as well as extensive series of drawings she investigates forms of interplay between language and image.

Emerging from the gestures of writing and from an associative understanding of forms, Meyer developed the "Wandlung" series of large format graphite drawings, for which she first became recognized. The German term "Wandlung" or "Transformation", represents a principle of the process-based, the transformative, the fleeting, the unstable, which recurs throughout Meyer's body of work. These are generally divided into thematically linked work-groups made up of small-format series, large-format drawings, as well as artist books and pamphlets.

=== Books ===
Since 1986, a central aspect of Nanne Meyer's work has been the making of yearbooks. They contain her archive, document her changing drawing repertoire, her range of forms, reflections from the everyday and key drawings for development in following series of work. To date 24 books with ca. 8500 drawings have been made. Yearbook 16 (September 2000 – March 2002) was published in facsimile in 2003 with support of the Kunstfonds Bonn (Gimlet Verlag Köln).

=== Most recent work ===
Taking as point of departure the fleeting and metaphoric aspect of clouds and the views out of airplane windows, since 2000 Meyer has been investigating specific aspects of perceptual/spatial experiences. In the works titled "Papierperspektive" ("Paper Perspectives"), various simultaneous points of view and the abstraction of seeing are formulated by means of lines and superimposed with graphic conventions drawn from meteorology and cartography. Emergent are dynamic, floating spaces with multiple perspectives which do not allow the gaze to come to rest. For the artist these drawings are both perceptual reflections of space as well as "thinking conduits". Nanne Meyer's work, including further images not included in this article, is documented on the artist's Official website.

== Exhibitions ==
=== Selected solo shows ===
1984

- Förderkoje Art Cologne, Köln, Petersen Galerie, Berlin

1989

- Kunsthalle Nürnberg

1990

- Art Frankfurt, Petersen Galerie, Berlin
- Goethe Institut, Rotterdam
- Städtische Galerie, Lüdenscheid

1991

- Kunstverein Marburg

1992

- Kulturforum Alte Post, Neuss
- Städtische Galerie, Delmenhorst

1999

- Kunstverein, Eislingen
- Städtische Galerie, Tuttlingen

1997

- Kunstmuseum, Bonn, "Zeichnung heute I" (with Silvia Bächli and Camill Leberer)
- Kunstverein Bochum

1998

- Kunstverein Siegen
- Städtische Galerie im Lenbachhaus, München

1999

- Art forum Berlin, Galerie & Edition Marlene Frei, Zürich
- Kunsthalle Winterhur

2000

- Kunstraum Büchsenhausen, Innsbruck (mit Eva-Maria Schön)

2002

- Staatliches Museum für Kunst u. Design, Nürnberg

2003

- Bucknell University, Samek Art Gallery, Lewisburg, PA

2004

- Kunsthalle Bremen

2005

- Luftblicke, Hamburger Kunsthalle, Saal der Meisterzeichnung

2006

- Kunstverein Würzburg

2008

- Institut für moderne Kunst, Nürnberg

2014

- Gemäldegalerie Kupferstichkabinett

=== Selected group shows ===
1992

- "Künstlerbücher", Neues Museum Weserburg, Bremen

1994

- "Multiple world", Atlanta College of Art Gallery, Atlanta Georgia, USA
- "Die Bücher der Künstler", Institut für Auslandsbez., Ifa – Galerie, Berlin

1996

- "Von den Dingen – Gegenstände in der zeitgenössischen Kunst", Museum zu Allerheiligen, Schaffhausen, Städtische Galerie Rähnitzgasse Dresden

1997

- "Zeichnen", Germanisches Nationalmuseum, Nürnberg

2001

- "Gezeichnet", Nassauischer Kunstverein, Wiesbaden

2002

- "Contemporary Positions in German Drawing", Milwaukee Institute of Art & Design" USA
- "Kopfreisen – Jules Verne, Adolf Wölfli und andere Grenzgänger”
- Kunstmuseum Bern, Schweiz
- "Fluxus und die Folgen", Kunstsommer Wiesbaden

2003

- "Herbarium der Blicke", Kunst- und Ausstellungshalle der BRD, Bonn

2004

- "In erster Linie", Museum Fridericianum Kassel

2005

- "Die Erfindung des Himmels", Aargauer Kunsthaus, Aarau, Schweiz
- "Wittgenstein in New York – Stadt und Architektur in der neueren Kunst auf Papier", Kupferstichkabinett, Berlin

2006

- "Kunst in Hamburg. Heute II", Galerie der Gegenwart, Hamburg

2009

- "As time goes by – Kunstwerke über Zeit", Berlinische Galerie, Berlin
- "Gestern oder im 2. Stock – Karl Valentin, Komik und Kunst seit 1948", Münchner Stadtmuseum
- "Die unsichtbare Hand – Zeitgenössische Zeichnung in der Städtischen Galerie Delmenhorst", Städt. Galerie Delmenhorst

2010

- "Linie, Line, Linea, Zeichnung der Gegenwart", Kunstmuseum Bonn
- "je mehr ich zeichne – Zeichnung als Weltentwurf", Museum für Gegenwartskunst, Siegen

== Public collections ==
- Kupferstichkabinett Berlin
- Berlinische Galerie – Landesmuseum für moderne Kunst, Photografie und Architektur
- Grafische Sammlung Kunsthalle Hamburg, Kupfertichkabinett
- Kunsthalle Bremen
- Kunstmuseum Bonn
- Museum für Kommunikation Frankfurt/Main
- Museum für Kunst und Design, Nürnberg
- Städtische Galerie Delmenhorst
- Gustav-Lübcke-Museum, Hamm
- Sammlung Hanck, Museum Kunstpalast Düsseldorf
- Sammlung der Bundesrepublik Deutschland
- Grafische Sammlungen der Bauten des Bundes in Berlin
- Artothek, Neuer Berliner Kunstverein
- Sammlung Graf von Faber Castell, Stein bei Nürnberg
- Sammlung Droege Group, Düsseldorf
- Sammlung Deutsche Bank
- Sammlung Bayrische Vereinsbank Nürnberg
- Sammlung der LandesBank Berlin
- Sammlung der Volksfürsorge Hamburg
- Kunstsammlung der ZÜRICH in Frankfurt
- Kunstsammlung der Klinik Hirslanden, Schweiz
