= Nanne (given name) =

Nanne is a given name. Notable people with the name include:

== Feminine ==
- Nanne Dahlman (born 1970), Finnish tennis player
- Nanne Grönvall (born 1962), Swedish singer-songwriter
- Nanne Meyer (born 1953), German artist
- Nanne Ruuskanen (born 2001), Finnish footballer

== Masculine ==
- Nanne Bergstrand (born 1956), Swedish footballer
- Nanne Choda, 12th-century Telugu poet
- Nanne Sluis (born 1983), Dutch rower
- Nanne Zwiep (1894–1942), Dutch pastor
