= Paul Wallat =

German landscape artist, draftsman and sculptor

- Born: 1 June 1879; Rostock, Mecklenburg, Germany
- Died: 24 November 1966 (aged 87); Sønderborg, Denmark
- Occupations: landscape artist, draftsman and sculptor

Paul Wallat (June 1, 1879 – November 24, 1966) was a German landscape artist, draftsman and sculptor.

== Life ==
Paul Wallat was the son of the shoemaker Gustav Wallat and brother of the sculptor Gustav Wallat. He graduated from a painter's apprenticeship in Rostock and from 1899 to 1902 studied painting at the School of Applied Arts Hamburg. Between 1902 and 1909 he attended the Preussische Akademie der Künste in Berlin at the history painter Otto Brausewetter (1835-1904) and the marine- and landscapepainter Carl Saltzmann.

In 1905 and 1906 Paul Wallat undertook a world tour on the MS "Charlotte" ("by the grace of the Wilhelm II, German Emperor"), later he often was in Holland and Belgium. On December 29, 1906, he received the award of the Ginsberg Foundation of the Berlin Academy. By 1917, he had his residence in Berlin, and in 1918 he came to Gehlsdorf, a small village near Rostock (today a city district). After 1949 he went to Sønderborg in Denmark.

== Works ==
This is a list of select work by Wallat:

=== Sculptures ===
- John Brinckman-Brunnen (fountain) (1914, Rostock)
- Artilleriedenkmal (artillery monument) (1923, Güstrow)
- Denkmal Ehrenfriedhof (monument for honor cemetery) (1922, Rostock)
- Entwurf Kriegerdenkmal (design for warrior-monument) (1924, Rostock)
- Kriegerdenkmal 1914/18 (1927, Bützow)
- Kriegerdenkmal 1914/18 (1933, Stavenhagen)
- Reliefs Rostocker Straßennamen (reliefs for street names) (1930 years)
- Bauplastik in Rostock (sculptures) (1930 years)
- Statuette Fritz Reuter (around 1933)
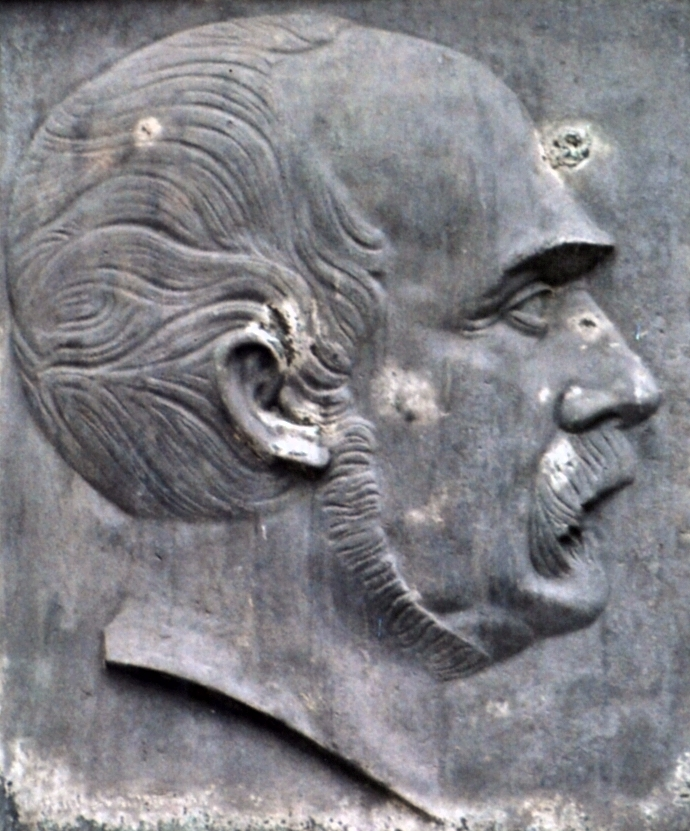
Relief John Brinckman Brunnen in Rostock

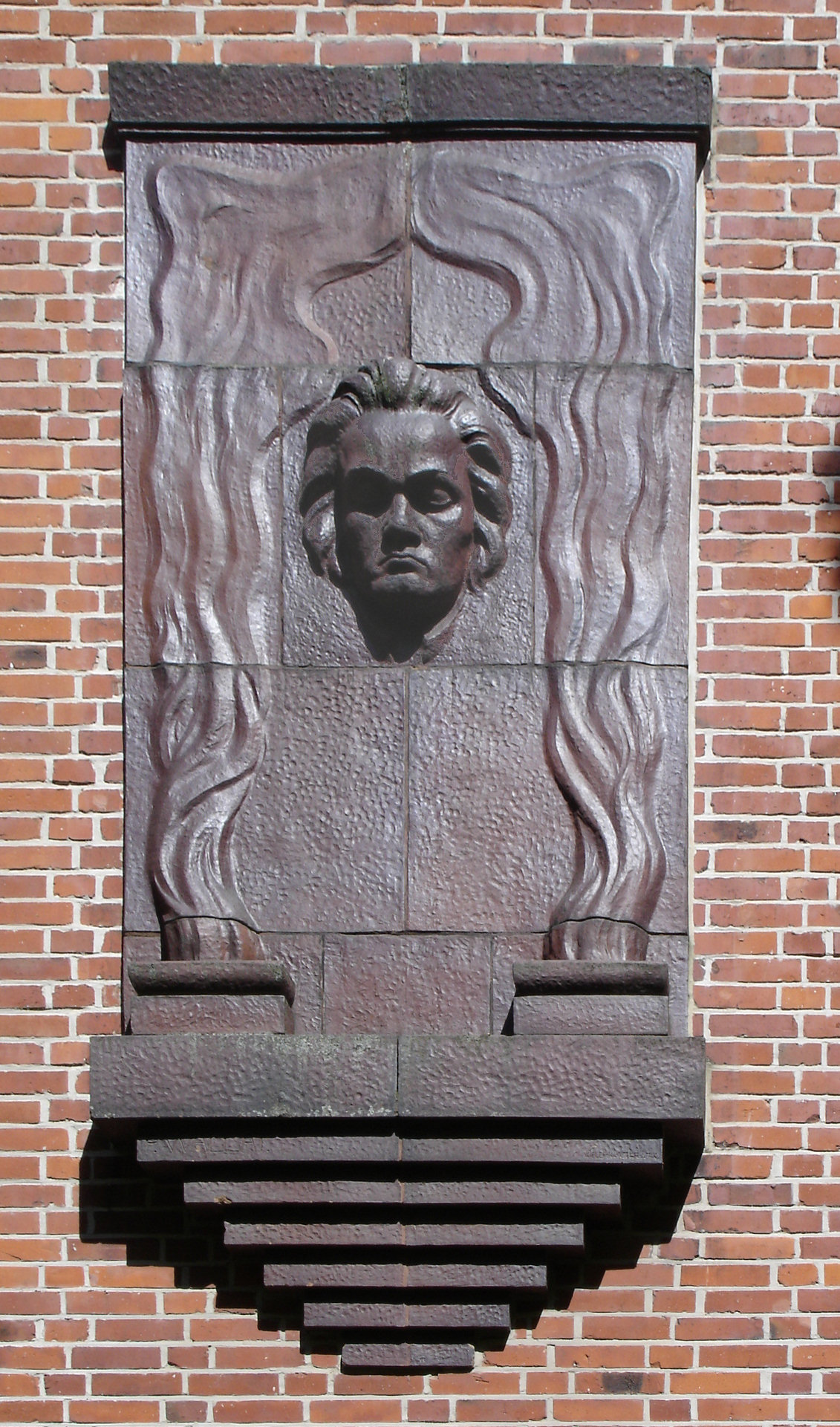
Relief Beethoven in Rostock

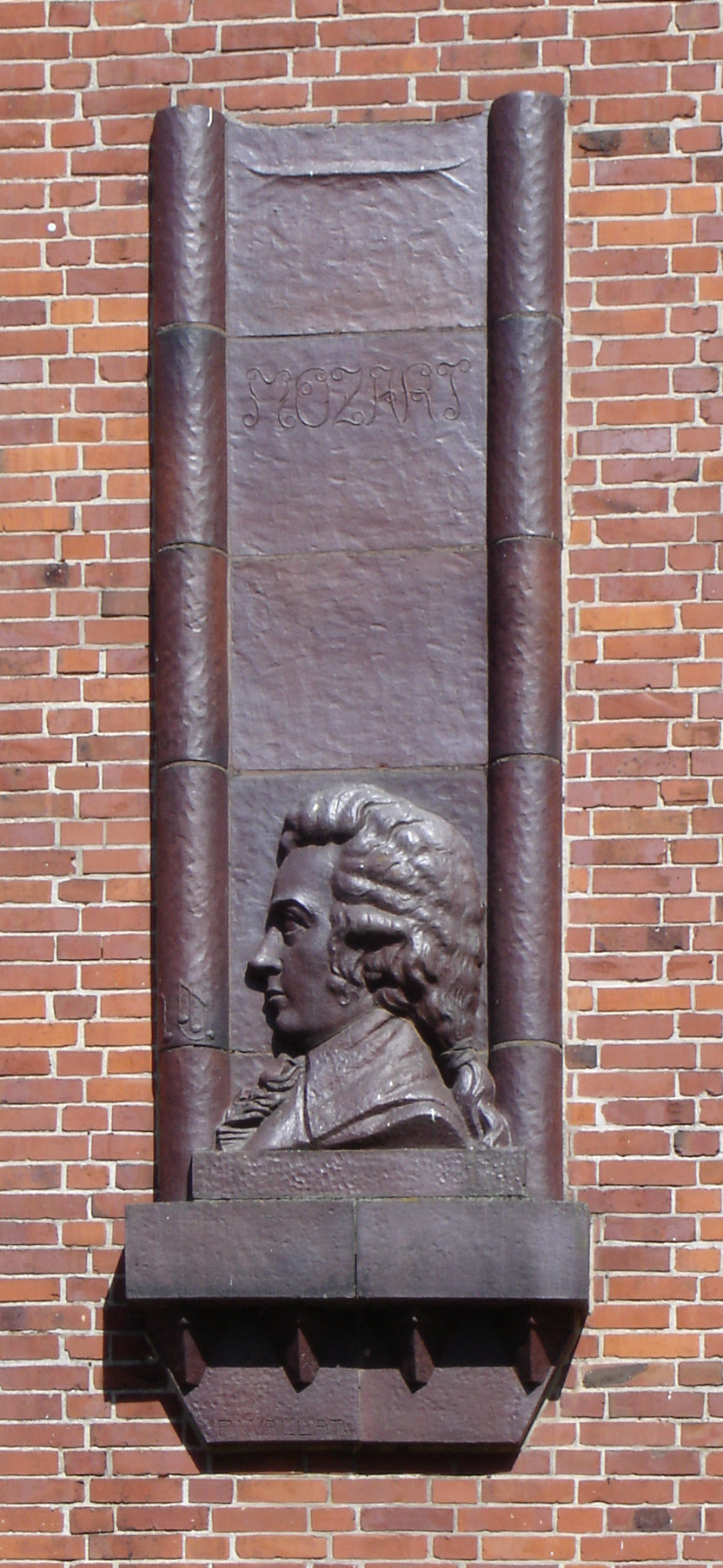
Relief Mozart in Rostock

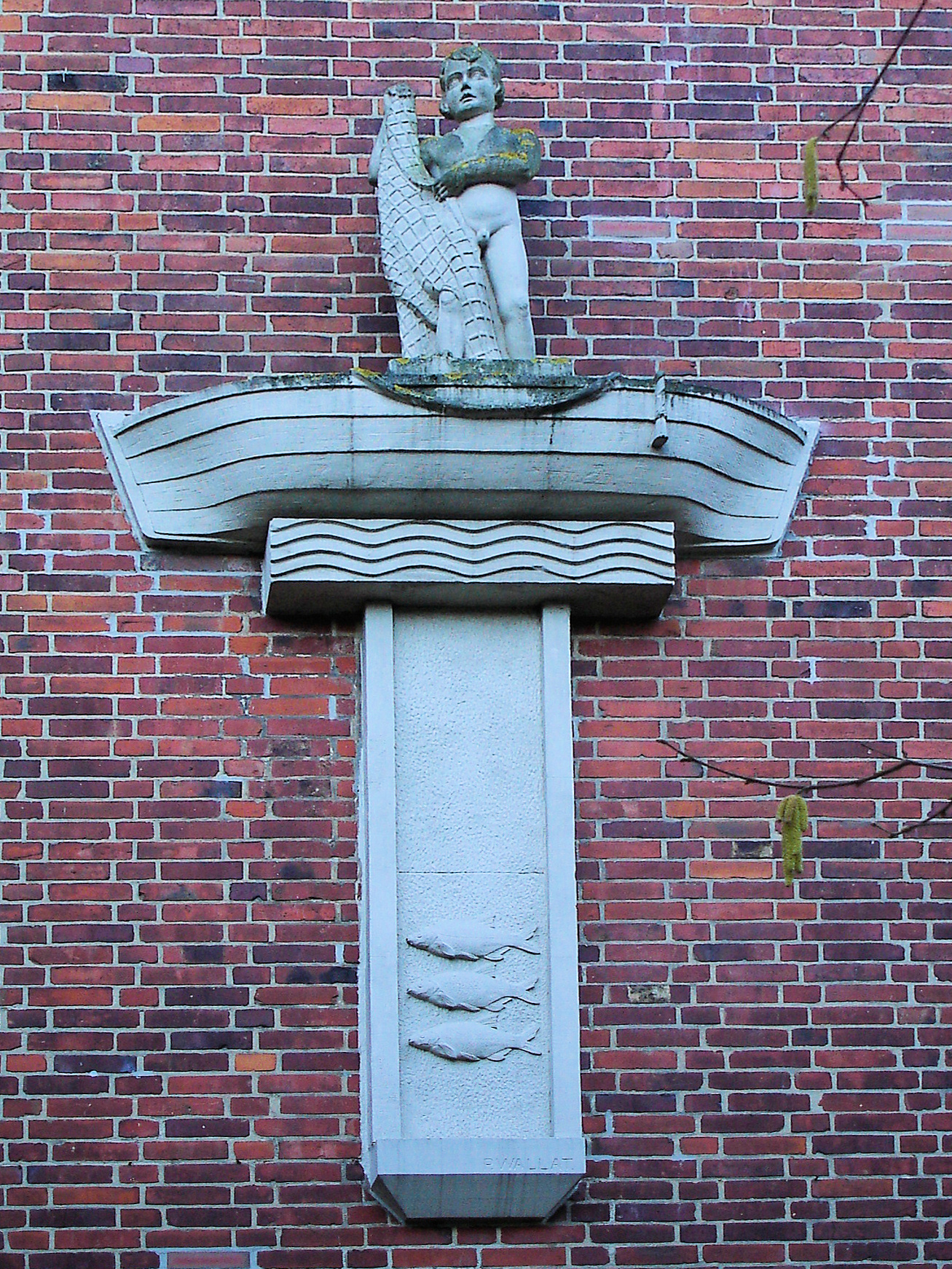
Relief Fisherboy in Rostock

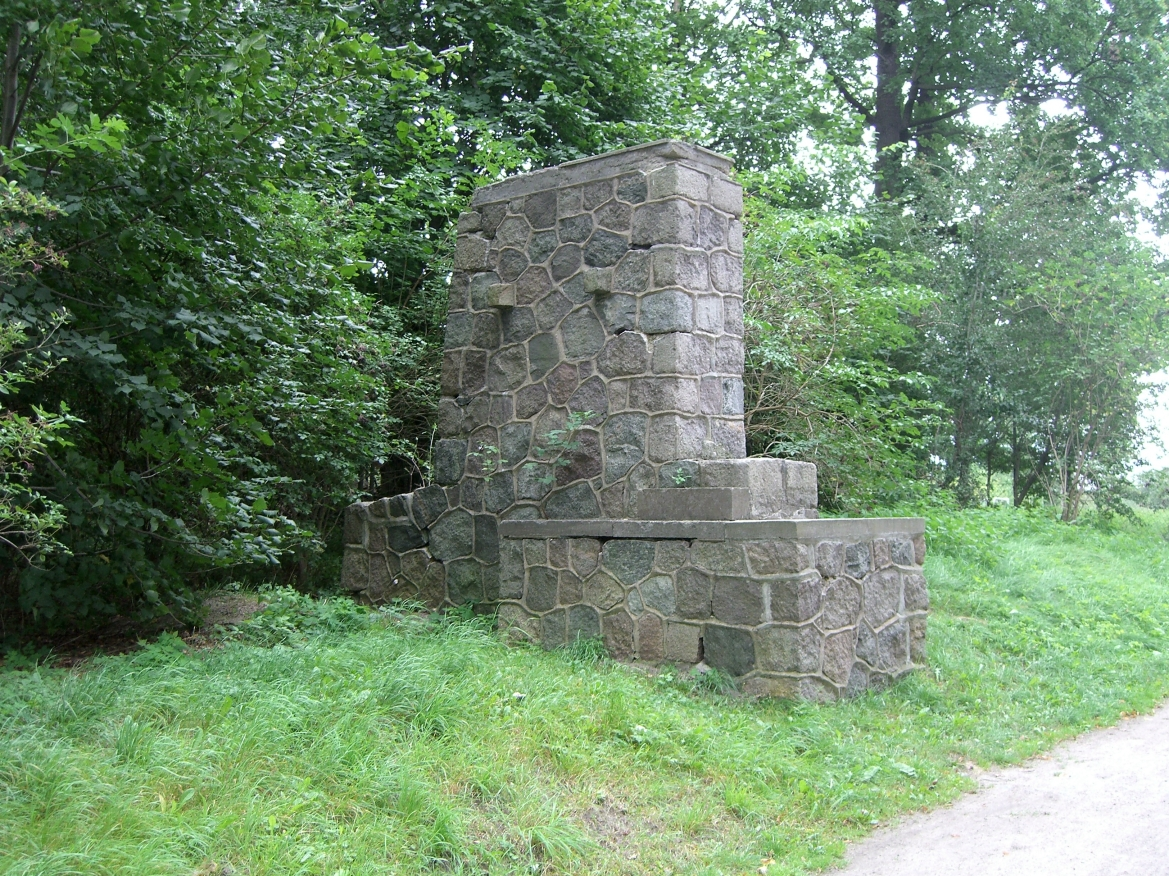
Denkmal 1914/18 in Stavenhagen (Figur destroyed)

== Paintings ==
- Ansicht der Kirche Plau am See (1901) (view of the church)

Paul Wallat was regularly represented with his works at the well known "Great Art Exhibition Berlin" since 1904.

- Auf der Heimfahrt (1904) (on the way home)
- Holländische Hochseefischer, ausfahrend (1905) (Dutch offshore fishermens, leaving port)
- Der dänische Flottenführer Peter Dene in Gefangenschaft (1908) (The Danish fleet leader Peter Dene in captivity)
- Abend im Eise (1909) (Evening into ice)
- Sorgenvoller Morgen (1910) (worried morning)
- Holländisches Nest (Etching) (Dutch village), Die Schiffbrüchigen (The shipwrecked) (1911)
- Gebet der Fischerfrauen (Prayer of fishermen's wives) (1914)
- Weddigens Heldentat am 22. September 1914 (heroic deed on ...) (1916)
- Tauwetter (thaw) (1917)

In 1939 an exhibition was devoted to Paul Wallat for occasion of his 60th birthday. This took place into the exhibition of Contemporary Mecklenburg painters at the Mecklenburg State Museum Schwerin. The following pictures were shown:

- Oil-paintings: Rostocker Hafen (Harbor), Wismarer Hafen, Vorfrühling (Early spring), Mühle am Bach (Mill on the brook), Am Delfter Kanal (On the Delft channel), Hamburger Hafen, Kuhstall (cowshed), Gehlsdorfer Straße (street), Alter Fischereihafen (old fisher harbor), Holzhafen Wismar (1935) (wood harbor), Einlaufende Kogge (1931) (incoming cog), Holländerin (Dutch woman), Den Stand entlang – Kattwijk (1912) (along the beach), Am Strande (on the beach), Holländer Hochseefischer (1905) (Dutch offshore fishermans), (the last tree paintings were in possession of the State Museum at this time)
- Etchings: two scenes from Dutch, Dordrecht, Frauenkopf (Head of a woman)
