= Wallas =

Wallas may refer to:

- Graham Wallas (1858–1932), English socialist
- Katharine Wallas (1864–1944), British politician
- Wallas Eaton (1917–1995), English actor
- Wallas, a brand of diesel or paraffin oil operated boat or summer cottage space heaters, stoves and ovens from Wallas-Marin Oy.

== See also ==
- Walla
