= Julia Phillips (artist) =

German-American artist

- Born: 1985 (age 40–41); Hamburg, Germany
- Education: Academy of Fine Arts Hamburg; Columbia University School of the Arts; Whitney Independent Study Program
- Known for: Sculpture, installation, drawing, printmaking, video, performance
- Movement: Contemporary art
- Awards: Creative Capital Award (2024); Artadia Award (2023)
- Website: https://juliaphillips.org

Julia Phillips (born 1985) is a German-American contemporary artist known for her sculptures, drawings, prints, videos, and performances. Her multidisciplinary practice explores themes of the body, power dynamics, psychological experiences, motherhood, race, and social relations through hybrid objects that resemble tools, prosthetics, and functional devices.

Phillips is represented by Matthew Marks Gallery and serves as associate professor in the Department of Visual Arts at the University of Chicago. Her work has been exhibited at major institutions including the 59th Venice Biennale, the Whitney Biennial, the Berlin Biennale, and the New Museum Triennial.

== Early life and education ==
Phillips was born in 1985 in Hamburg, Germany, and holds dual German and American citizenship. She received her Diploma from the Academy of Fine Arts Hamburg (HFBK) in 2012. In 2015, she earned an MFA from Columbia University School of the Arts in New York. She participated in the Whitney Museum Independent Study Program (Studio) from 2015 to 2016.

She lives and works between Chicago and Berlin.

== Work ==
Phillips primarily works in ceramics and metal, creating sculptural objects that function as metaphorical tools for imagined social or psychological scenarios. Her pieces often incorporate body casts, glazed surfaces (including metallic finishes), and mechanical elements. Recurring themes include power relations, protection, violence, attachment, motherhood, and the uncanny.

== Exhibitions ==
=== Selected solo exhibitions ===
- 2026: Inside, Before They Speak, Barbican Centre (The Curve), London
- 2022: Me, Ourself & You, Matthew Marks Gallery, New York
- 2022: Observer, Observed, High Line Art, New York
- 2021: Between Love and Loss, Matthew Marks Gallery, Los Angeles
- 2020: New Album, Matthew Marks Gallery, New York
- 2019: Fake Truth, Kunstverein Braunschweig, Germany
- 2018: Failure Detection, MoMA PS1, New York

=== Selected group exhibitions ===
- 2024: Whitney Biennial 2024, Whitney Museum of American Art, New York
- 2022: The Milk of Dreams, 59th Venice Biennale
- 2021: Grief and Grievance: Art and Mourning in America, New Museum, New York
- 2018: 10th Berlin Biennale and New Museum Triennial: Songs for Sabotage

== Recognition ==
Phillips has received the K21 Global Art Award (2026), the Creative Capital Award (2025), the Pritzker Pucker Family Foundation Artadia Award (2023), and the Karl Schmidt-Rottluff Grant, among others. She has participated in residencies at the Studio Museum in Harlem, Skowhegan School of Painting and Sculpture, and EMPAC. She joined the University of Chicago faculty in 2018 and was promoted to associate professor in 2026.
