= Carl Otto Czeschka =

Austrian artist (1878–1960)

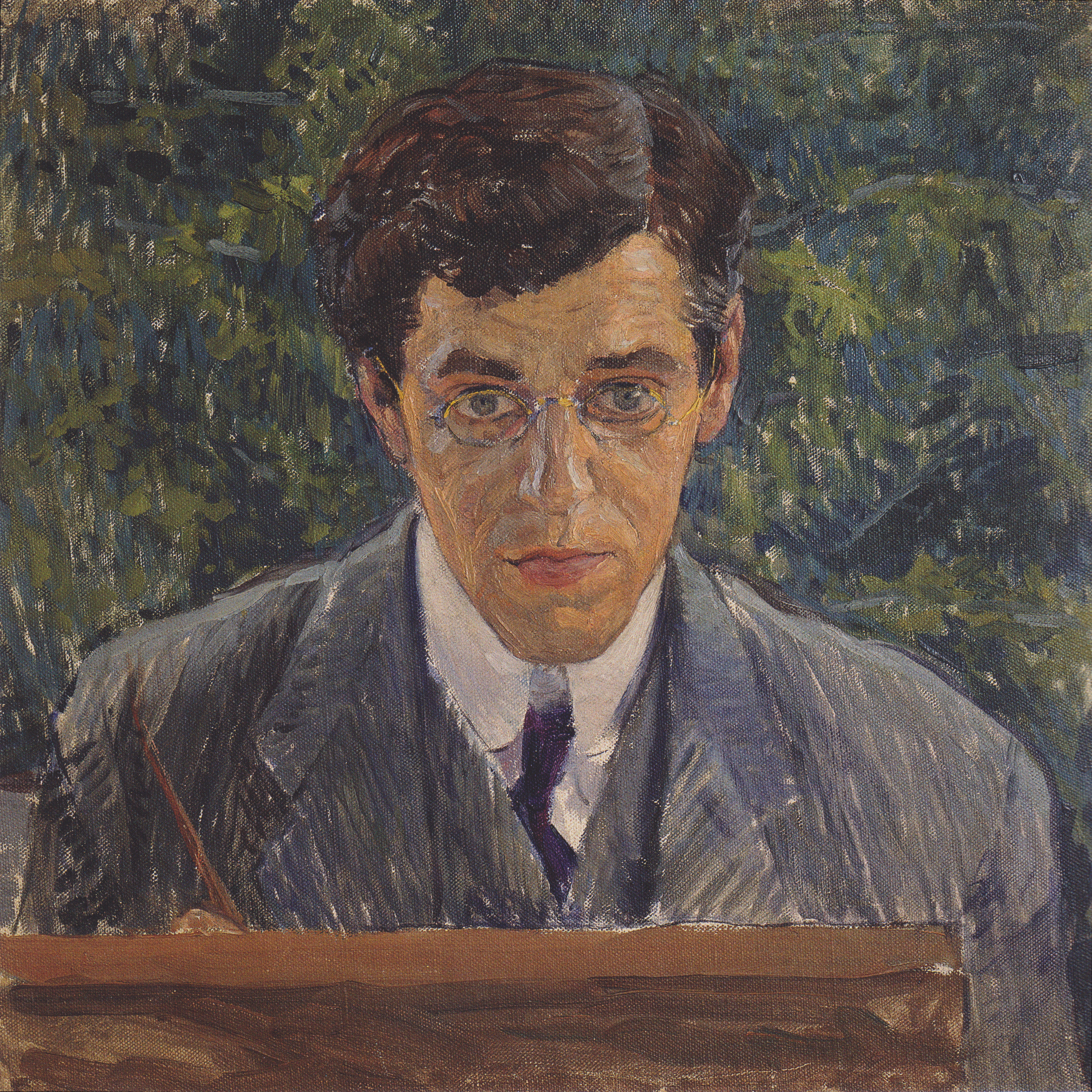
- Koloman Moser (1909) Portrait of Carl Otto Czeschka
- Born: 24 January 1878 or 22 October 1878; Vienna, Austria-Hungary
- Died: 30 July 1960; Hamburg, West Germany
- Burial place: Ohlsdorf Cemetery

Carl Otto Czeschka (22 October 1878 – 30 July 1960) was a Czech painter and graphic designer associated with the Wiener Werkstätte.

== Life ==
Carl Otto Czeschka was half Bohemian and half Moravian origin. His father Wenzel Czeschka (Václav Češka) was a master carpenter, and his mother Mathilde Hafner worked as a seamstress and embroiderer. Carl Otto Czeschka was raised in Vienna under very poor background. He lived in the Zinckgasse 6, Neu-Fünfhaus, Fünfhaus, Rudolfsheim-Fünfhaus. He worked intensely as a designer and book illustrator, making designs for many books, leaflets, programs, placards, and related media. He was a friend of Gustav Klimt. His best known book is an art edition of the German tale "The Nibelungs" (Die Nibelungen), full in the Sezesion style that was predominant at his time.

== Works ==
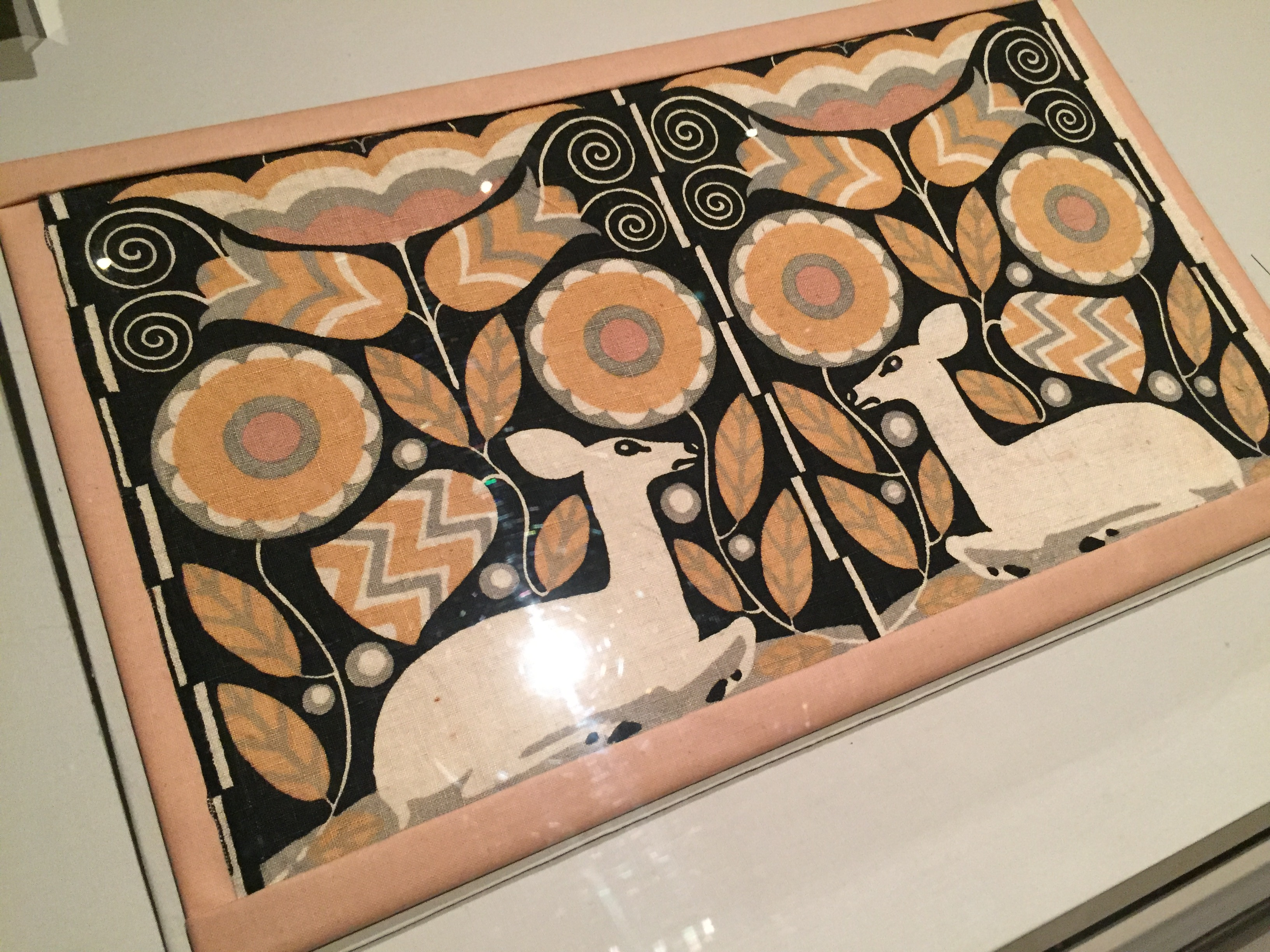
Waldidyll (Forest Idyll), 1910–1911, by Carl Otto Czeschka.

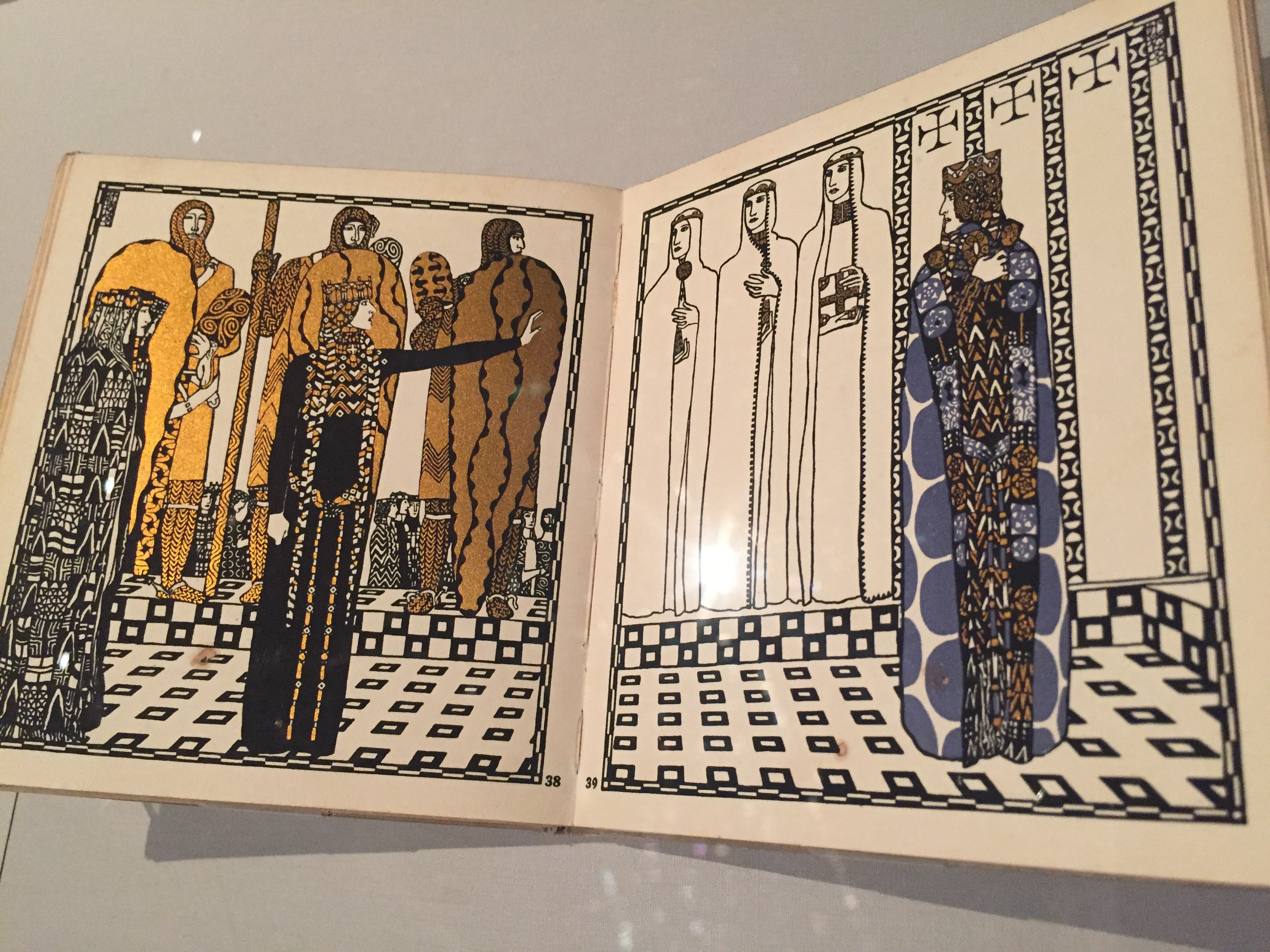
Die Nibelungen , 1909, by Carl Otto Czeschka.

His most famous work is "The Nibelungs" (Die Nibelungen), Carl Otto Czeschka's artwork has been prominently showcased in several esteemed galleries and museums, including the Neue Galerie New York and the Museum for German and Austrian Art. Carl Otto Czeschka's artworks have appeared in various auctions, fetching prices that span from US$59 to an impressive US$360,500. The value largely depends on factors such as the dimensions and materials used in the creation of the piece. Notably, the highest auction price for this artist was achieved in 2017 at Sotheby's New York, where a collection of 16 original illustrations titled "An Important Suite Original Illustrations for Die Nibelungen Dem Deutschen Volke" sold for US$360,500.
