= Gertrude Degenhardt =

German artist (1940–2025)

- Degenhardt in c. 1990
- Born: Gertrude Schwell; 1 October 1940; New York City, U.S.
- Died: 12 November 2025 (aged 85); Greifswald, Mecklenburg–Western Pomerania, Germany
- Occupation: Artist
- Awards: Order of Merit of Rhineland-Palatinate
- Website: www.gertrude-degenhardt.de

Gertrude Degenhardt (1 October 1940 – 12 November 2025) was a German artist, especially a lithographer and illustrator. She illustrated the texts and albums of Franz Josef Degenhardt and other political writers and singers including François Villon, Liam O'Flaherty, Bertolt Brecht, and Wolf Biermann, often with a sense of absurdity and grotesque. In the 1990s, she turned to topics around women, portraying them in the art books Women in Music, Vagabondage in Blue, and Vagabondage en Rouge.

== Life and career ==
Gertrude Schwell was born in New York City on 1 October 1940 to German parents and grew up in Berlin from age two. Her childhood was marked by the Nazi regime, bombings, and the difficult time after World War II. Her family moved to Mainz in 1956, where she finished her schooling. She studied at the Staatliche Werkkunstschule für Gebrauchsgrafik, a school for applied graphics, until 1959, and then worked for advertising agencies in Frankfurt and Düsseldorf.

She met Franz Josef Degenhardt, his brother Martin, and their circle of friends, including other singer-songwriters (Liedermacher) Dieter Süverkrüp, Hannes Wader, and Hein and Oss Kröher.

From the mid-1960s, Degenhardt worked as a freelance artist. She designed covers for Franz Josef Degenhardt's albums, including Spiel nicht mit den Schmuddelkindern. Illustrations to François Villon's Das Große Testament received the "Schönstes Buch" (most beautiful book) award from the Stiftung Buchkunst in 1970. She also worked with the acclaimed American expatriate folk musician Hedy West, illustrating a collection of West's songs in 1968. In 1977 she provided illustrations to the songbook of singers Hein & Oss, Das sind unsre Lieder, a collection of songs neglected under the Nazi regime.

=== Personal life ===
She lived in Mainz from 1956. In 1964, she married Martin Degenhardt, who died in 2002. Their daughter Annette Degenhardt became a guitarist and composer. Gertrude Degenhardt later also lived in Galway, Ireland.

Degenhardt died in Greifswald on 12 November 2025, at the age of 85.

== Artistic style ==
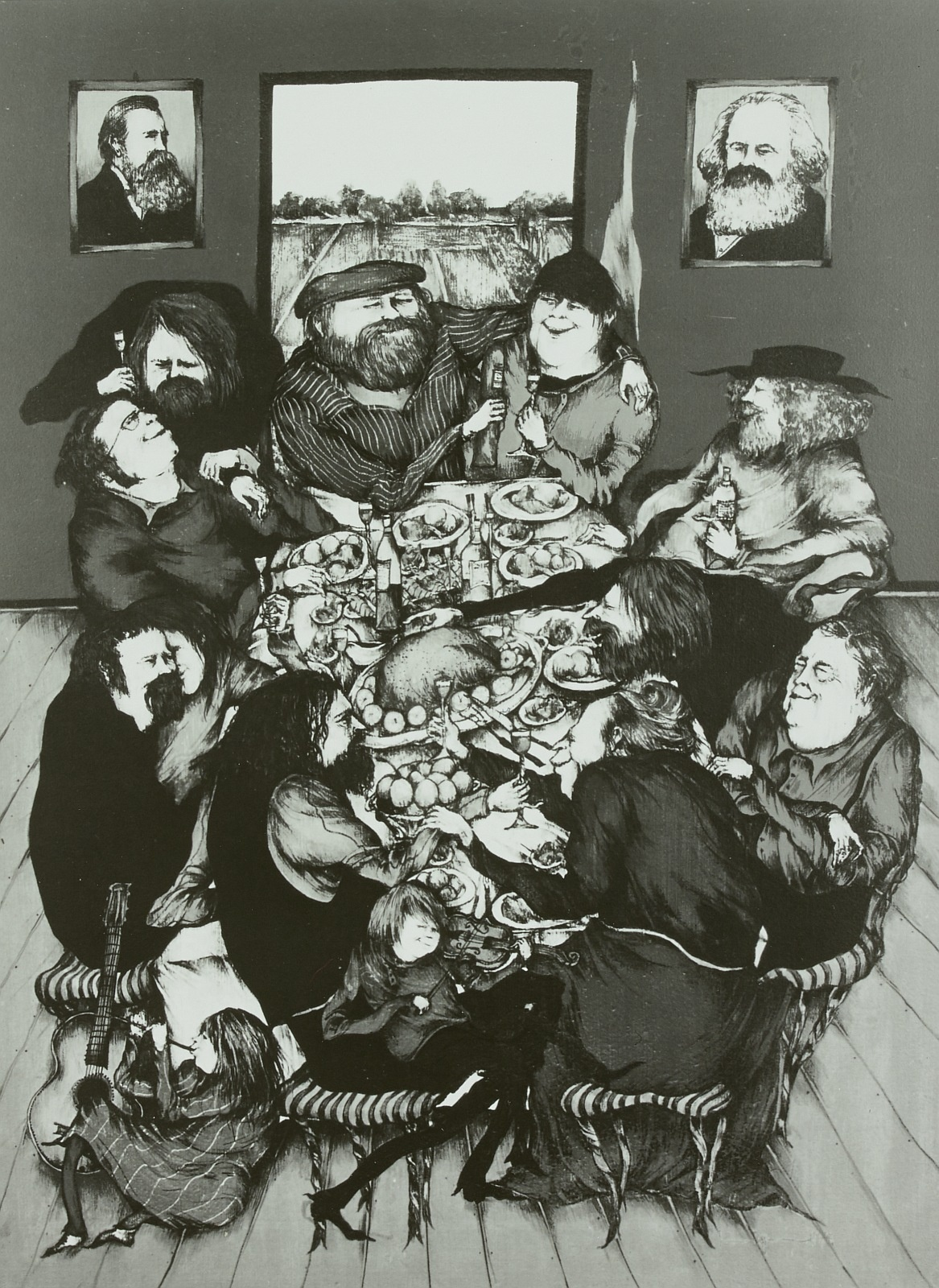
Und sollten denn auch feiern, wohl vor der Feierzeit, 1976 screenprint by Gertrude Degenhardt. She "portrayed" herself with her husband at the end of the table

In her works, Degenhardt appears as a keen observer of persons and their characteristics, rendered with a sense of absurdity and the grotesque. Among her topics are enjoyment of life, hate, desire, admiration, bliss, disdain, greed, and suffering. Music and wine are frequent features of her work; she also portrayed the Gonsbach valley, revolution (Republic of Mainz), vagabonds, dance, musicians, tramps, Ireland (Farewell to Connaught), and, repeatedly, her husband Martin Degenhardt. She portrayed John Lennon in an etching Give Peace a Chance. Some sequences, such as Fiddle & Pint, were first exhibited in Dublin.

In the 1990s, she turned to women's topics such as Vagabondage, cycles of wild and unique women, in books such as Women in Music, Vagabondage in Blue, and Vagabondage en Rouge, with women making music in protest of political failures and social injustice. Vagabondage Ad Mortem is a danse macabre of 1995. Degenhardt illustrated many texts and books, such as Liam O'Flaherty's Der Stromer, and works by Brecht, Biermann, her brother-in-law Franz Josef Degenhardt, and other political authors, as well as record covers for Irish folk music and singer-songwriters.

== Awards ==
- 1968 Graphik-Biennale-Preis in Kraków, Poland
- 1976 Graphik-Biennale-Preis in Fredrikstad, Norway
- 1978 Silver Medal of the world exhibition of Buchkunst (book art) in Tel Aviv for the songbook Das sind unsre Lieder.
- 2001: Order of Merit of Rhineland-Palatinate
- 2019: Hannes Gaab Prize of Mainz

== Exhibitions ==
Exhibitions included:

- 1988: Museum der bildenden Künste, Leipzig
- 1989: The Kenny Gallery
- 1990: Mittelrhein-Museum
- 1993: Vagabondage – Women in Music, Kulturspeicher of Stadtmuseum Oldenburg
- 1993: Literaturhaus Berlin
- 1994: Imagines – Women in Music, Galerie Kramer, Hamburg
- 1995: Vagabondage ad Mortem, Andreas Paul Weber Museum, Ratzeburg
- 1998: Villa Musica
- 1999: Kulturspeicher, Oldenburg
- 2002: Haus des Buches, Leipzig
- 2002: The Kenny Gallery, Galway
- 2004: Schloss Engers
- 2005: Gallery of Büchergilde Gutenberg, Frankfurt
- 2006: Schloss Landestrost
- 2007: Stadtmuseum Borken
- 2007: Maison de Rhénanie-Palatinat, Dijon
- 2011: Retrospective on the occasion of her 75th birthday in Kulturspeicher of Stadtmuseum Oldenburg
- 2024: The Kenny Gallery

Degenhardt is listed as one of the 100 most influential women in Rhineland-Palatinate.

== Publications ==
- Das Fest kann beginnen. Maison de Rhénanie-Palatinat und Edition GD, Mainz 2006. ISBN 3-923929-12-9
- Tanzende Paare. Edition Villa Musica und Edition GD, Mainz 2004. ISBN 3-923929-11-0
- Vagabondage en rouge. Pinselzeichnungen, Lithographie, Radierungen. Edition GD, Mainz 2001. ISBN 3-923929-10-2
- Fiddle & Pint. Edition GD, Mainz 2000. ISBN 3-923929-09-9
- Quartette. Edition Villa Musica und Edition GD, Mainz 1998. ISBN 3-923929-08-0
- Vagabondage in blue. Frauen an Trommeln. Edition GD, Mainz 1996. ISBN 3-923929-07-2
- Vagabondage ad mortem. Musikanten des Todes. Edition GD, Mainz 1995. ISBN 3-923929-06-4
- Musikfrauen – Women in Music. Mittelrhein-Museum Koblenu und Edition GD, Mainz 1990. ISBN 3-923929-03-X
- Farewell to Connaught. 65 Kaltnadel-Radierungen von der irischen Westküste. Büchergilde Gutenberg, Frankfurt/M. 1989. ISBN 3-7632-2859-4
- In praise of pints oder Maria zu Ehren. 40 Zeichnungen mit dem Gänsekiel. Edition GD, Mainz 1983, ISBN 3-923929-00-5
- So ein Tag, so wunderschön wie heute. Limpert, Frankfurt/M. 1974. ISBN 3-7853-1197-4
