= Mahlau =

Origin
- Language: German
- Meaning: ?
- Region of origin: Germany

Mahlau is a surname. Notable people with the surname include:

- Alfred Mahlau (1894–1967), German painter, graphic artist, professor
- Hans Mahlau (1900–1991), German actor
