= Edwin Scharff Prize =

German award

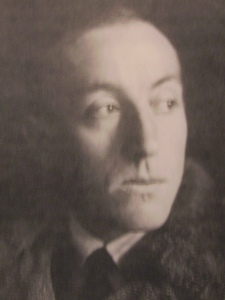
Edwin Scharff

The Edwin Scharff Prize (German: Edwin-Scharff-Preis) has been awarded annually by the city of Hamburg since 1955, named after sculptor Edwin Scharff. The prize is awarded to artist who shaped the cultural life of Hamburg. The winners are chosen by a seven-member jury, which is appointed by the Senate. The prize money is €15,000.

== List of recipients ==
- 1955 Erich Hartmann and Hans Martin Ruwoldt
- 1956 Arnold Fiedler and Fritz Husmann
- 1957 Karl Kluth and Herbert Spangenberg
- 1958 Fritz Kronenberg and Richard Steffen
- 1959 Willem Grimm and Eylert Spars
- 1960 Tom Hops and Martin Irwahn
- 1961 Fritz Flinte and Karl August Ohrt
- 1962 Ivo Hauptmann and Alfred Mahlau
- 1963 Joachim Albrecht and Ursula Querner
- 1964 Werner Reichold and Gustav Seitz
- 1965 Horst Janssen and Paul Wunderlich
- 1966 Fritz Fleer and Hans Sperschneider
- 1967 Friedrich Ahlers-Hestermann
- 1968 Gisela Bührmann and Diether Kressel
- 1969 Volker Detlef Heydorn and Hans Kock
- 1970 Werner Bunz and Harald Duwe
- 1971 Knud Knabe and Jörn Pfab
- 1972 Armin Sandig and Manfred Sihle-Wissel
- 1973 Volker Meier and Hans Hermann Steffens
- 1974 Almut Heise and Karin Witte
- 1975 Edgar Augustin and Anna Oppermann
- 1976 Ingrid Webendoerfer and Wilhelm M. Busch
- 1977 Kai Sudeck
- 1978 no recipient
- 1979 Dieter Glasmacher
- 1980 Detlef Birgfeld
- 1981 Christa Lühtje and Holger Matthies
- 1982 Klaus Kröger
- 1983 Ulrich Rückriem
- 1984 Claus Böhmler
- 1985 Hanne Darboven
- 1986 Gudrun Piper and Max Hermann Mahlmann
- 1987 Jan Meyer Rogge
- 1988 Gustav Kluge
- 1989 Franz Erhard Walther
- 1990 Stanley Brouwn
- 1993 Jürgen Bordanowicz
- 1994 Rolf Rose
- 1995 Hyun-Sook Song
- 1996 Anna and Bernhard Blume
- 1997 Klaus Kumrow
- 1998 Andreas Slominski
- 1999 Gisela Bullacher
- 2000 Nicola Torke
- 2001 Bogomir Ecker
- 2002 Wiebke Siem
- 2003 Daniel Richter
- 2004 Till Krause
- 2005 Jochen Lempert
- 2006 Michael Dörner
- 2007 Anna Gudjónsdóttir
- 2008 Jeanne Faust
- 2009 Linda McCue
- 2010 Frank Gerritz
- 2011 Peter Piller
- 2012 "Ort des Gegen e.V." in honor of Annette Wehrmann
- 2013 Gunter Reski
- 2014 Christoph Schäfer
- 2015 Stefan Kern
- 2016 Silke Grossmann
- 2017 Thomas Baldischwyler
- 2018 Michaela Melián
- 2019 Alexander Rischer
- 2020 Jochen Schmith
- 2021 Nana Petzet
- 2022 Eske Schlüters
- 2023 Künstlerinnenkollektiv 3 Hamburger Frauen
- 2024 Georges Adéagbo
