= Horst Janssen =

German draftsman, printmaker, poster artist and illustrator

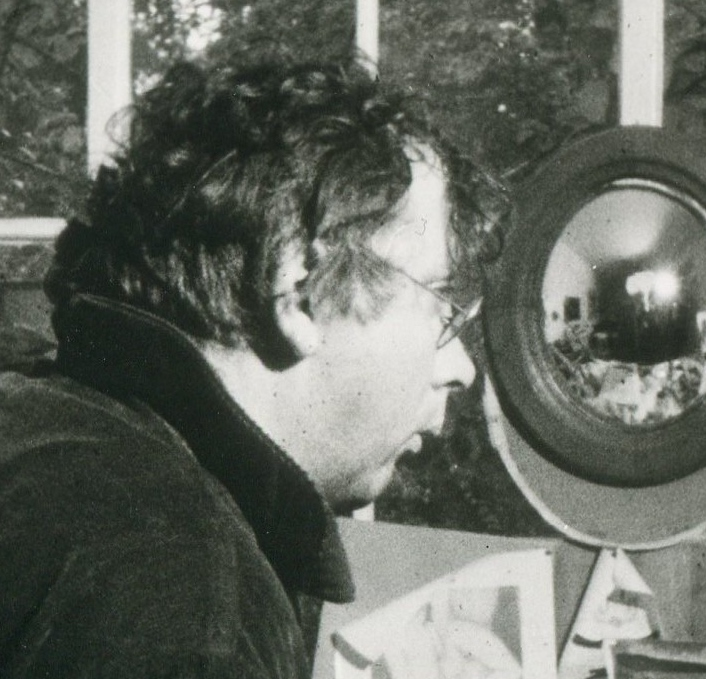
- Janssen in his studio, 1968
- Born: 14 November 1929; Hamburg, Germany
- Died: 31 August 1995 (aged 65); Hamburg, Germany
- Education: Hochschule für bildende Künste Hamburg
- Occupations: Draftsman; Printmaker; Poster artist; Illustrator

Horst Janssen (14 November 1929 – 31 August 1995) was a German draftsman, printmaker, poster artist and illustrator. He had a prolific output of drawings, etchings, woodcuts, lithographs and wood engravings.

Janssen was a student of Alfred Mahlau at the Landeskunstschule Hamburg. He first published in the newsweekly Die Zeit in 1947. In the early 1950s, he started working in lithography, on an initiative of Aschaffenburg paper manufacturer Guido Dessauer, using the technical facilities of a coloured paper factory. The first retrospective of Janssen's drawings and graphic works was shown in 1965, first in the kestnergesellschaft Hanover, then in other German cities and in Basel. In 1966, he was awarded Hamburg's Edwin Scharff Prize. International exhibitions followed. In 1968, he received the Grand Prize in graphic art at the Venice Biennale; in 1977, his works were shown at the documenta VI in Kassel.

The Horst Janssen Museum in his hometown of Oldenburg is dedicated to his legacy. His work is shown internationally in major museums.

His life was marked by numerous marriages, outspoken opinions, alcoholism, and selfless dedication to the art of printmaking.

== Early life and education ==
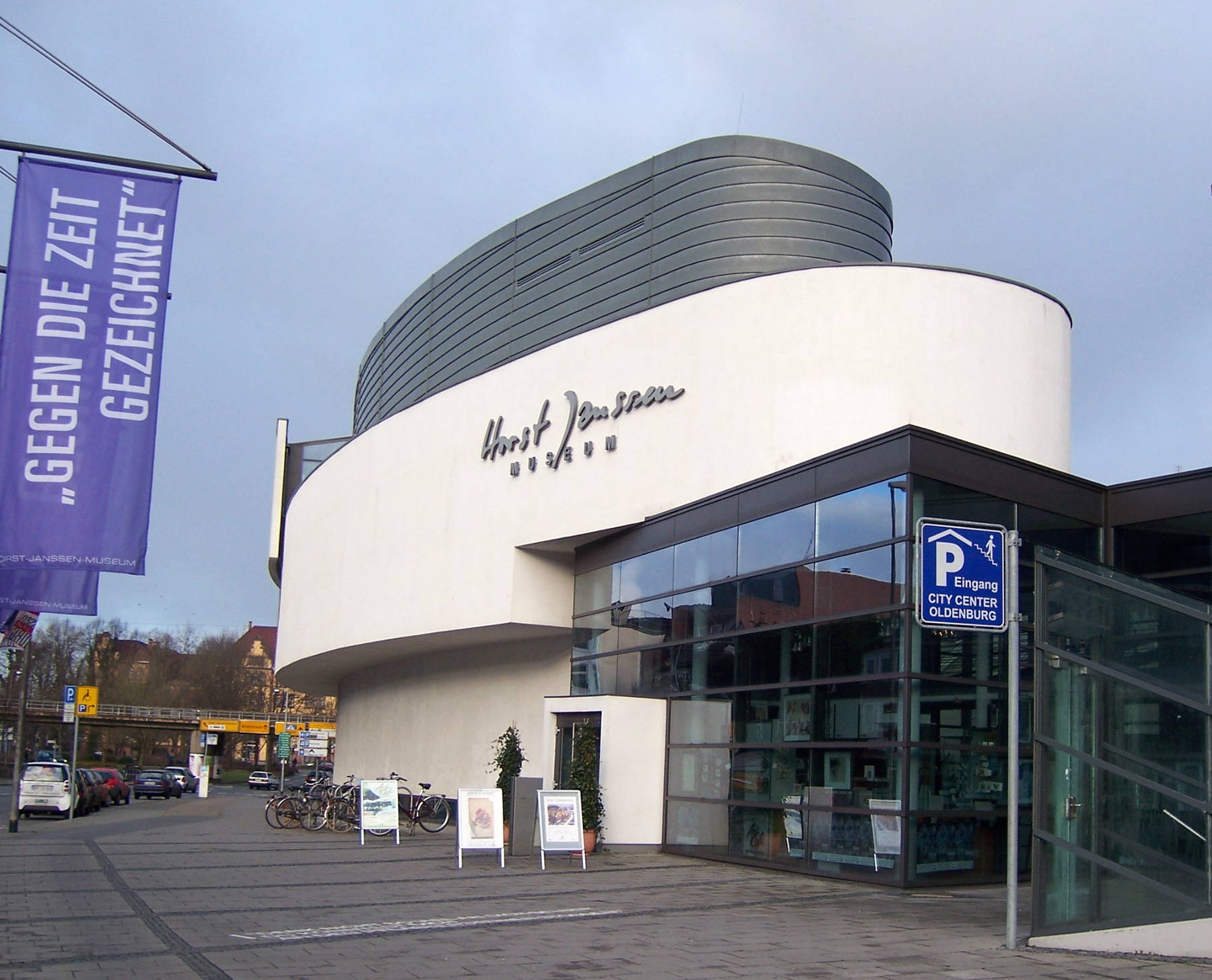
Horst Janssen Museum in Oldenburg

Janssen was born in Hamburg. His mother, Martha Janssen, was a dressmaker from Oldenburg; he never knew his father. Janssen was brought up by his mother and grandparents at Lerchenstraße 14, Oldenburg. He was adopted by his grandfather, and following his death, he was adopted by the Guardianship Court in 1939.

In 1942, he became a student at the National Political Institute of Education (German: Nationalpolitische Erziehungsanstalt or napola) in Haselünne, Emsland, where an art teacher, Hans Wienhausen, encouraged his artistic talent. His mother died in 1943. In 1944, he was adopted by his mother's younger sister, Anna Janssen, and he moved to Hamburg, where she lived. He lived with his Aunt Anna on Burchardstraße for the remainder of the war and the postwar period. They later moved to Warburgstraße (Harvestehude). In 1946, at the age of sixteen, Janssen enrolled at the Landeskunstschule (regional art school) in Hamburg, where he studied with Alfred Mahlau, proving to be an outstanding pupil from the outset.

== First publications ==
Janssen's first publication was a drawing in the weekly newspaper Die Zeit in 1947. The following year he published his first book, the children's book Seid ihr alle da? (Are you all there?), with Rolf Italiaander. In 1950 his first child, son Clemens, was born and he wrote and illustrated his second book, Der Wettlauf zwischen Hase und Igel auf der Buxtehuder Heide (The race between the hare and the hedgehog on the Buxtehude Heath), for the birthday of a little girl named Friederike Gutsche. It was published in a facsimile edition in 1973.

Janssen produced his first woodcuts, influenced by Edvard Munch. Dominant themes were animals along with man and woman. In 1952, he received a Lichtwark scholarship in Hamburg. Around the same time, he was forced to leave the Landeskunstschule. The following year, he was arrested after a drunken brawl and tried for murder. He was found innocent of the charge, but received a suspended sentence for drunkenness.

== Lithography ==
In the early 1950s, he received a commission from the paper manufacturer Guido Dessauer for a portrait of his father-in-law, the diplomat Friedrich von Keller, followed by other portraits of family members. Janssen was able to create his first lithographs using the technical equipment of the Aschaffenburger Buntpapierfabrik. His early lithographs were shown in 2000 by the Hamburger Kunsthalle. They included "Baumwall" (Tree Mound; 1957); his first self-portraits, such as "Selbst-innig" (Intimate with Self; 1966) and poster designs, influenced by Ben Shan, for his own exhibitions. Another self-portrait, "Selbst singend" (Self, singing), shows the artist with wide open mouth, as if expressing "tiefe Welt- und Gottesverzweiflung" (profound despair about the world and God), according to a reviewer. He changed a lithograph by Oskar Kokoschka, picturing himself upright, the other of two figures kneeling, titled "So liebt mich Oskar – Ja!" (Oskar loves me like that – Yes!). The exhibition also showed a piece, on which Janssen and his colleague André Thomkins had pictured each other, together with Thomkins' aphorism "Alles nicht wissen, heißt alles verzeihen" (To not know all means forgive all).

In 1955, he married Marie Knauer and in 1956, had a second child, a daughter, Katrin (nicknamed Lamme). During this period, he worked on a series of large-scale color woodcuts that were displayed in his apartment in 1957. Janssen gained recognition and had an exhibition in Hanover in the Hans Brockstedt Gallery in 1957. After this successful show, he suddenly switched to etching, becoming a pupil of Paul Wunderlich, whom he later considered a rival. His marriage to Marie ended in divorce in 1959. His art was now influenced by art brut and Jean Dubuffet. A new marriage, to Birgit Sandner, was followed by a separation a few weeks later. The following year, 1960, he married Verena von Bethmann Hollweg who, in 1961, gave birth to his third child, a son named Philip.

== Art Prize ==
In 1964, Horst Janssen was awarded the Darmstadt Art Prize. In 1965, a retrospective of his drawings and graphic works appeared in the kestnergesellschaft in Hanover. Wieland Schmied, the director of the kestnergesellschaft praised him as "der größte Zeichner außer Picasso. Aber Picasso ist eine andere Generation" ("the greatest draftsman besides Picasso. But Picasso is a different generation"). His works were seen in the tradition of Goya, Ensor, Klinger, Munch, Redon and Kubin. Titles included "Totentanz" (Death Dance), "Idiot", "High Society", "Im Suff" (Sloshed), a self-portrait, "Twist tanzende Nutten" (Twist dancing hookers), "Klee und Ensor, um einen Bückling streitend" (Klee and Ensor, arguing over a kipper, "Bückling" carrying the double meaning, both a smoked herring and a bowing) and "Peter Lorre oder einer, der aus Berufung die schöne Aussicht versperrt". The collection, the first major public display of his work, was also shown in Hamburg, Darmstadt, Berlin, Düsseldorf, Stuttgart, Munich and Basel.

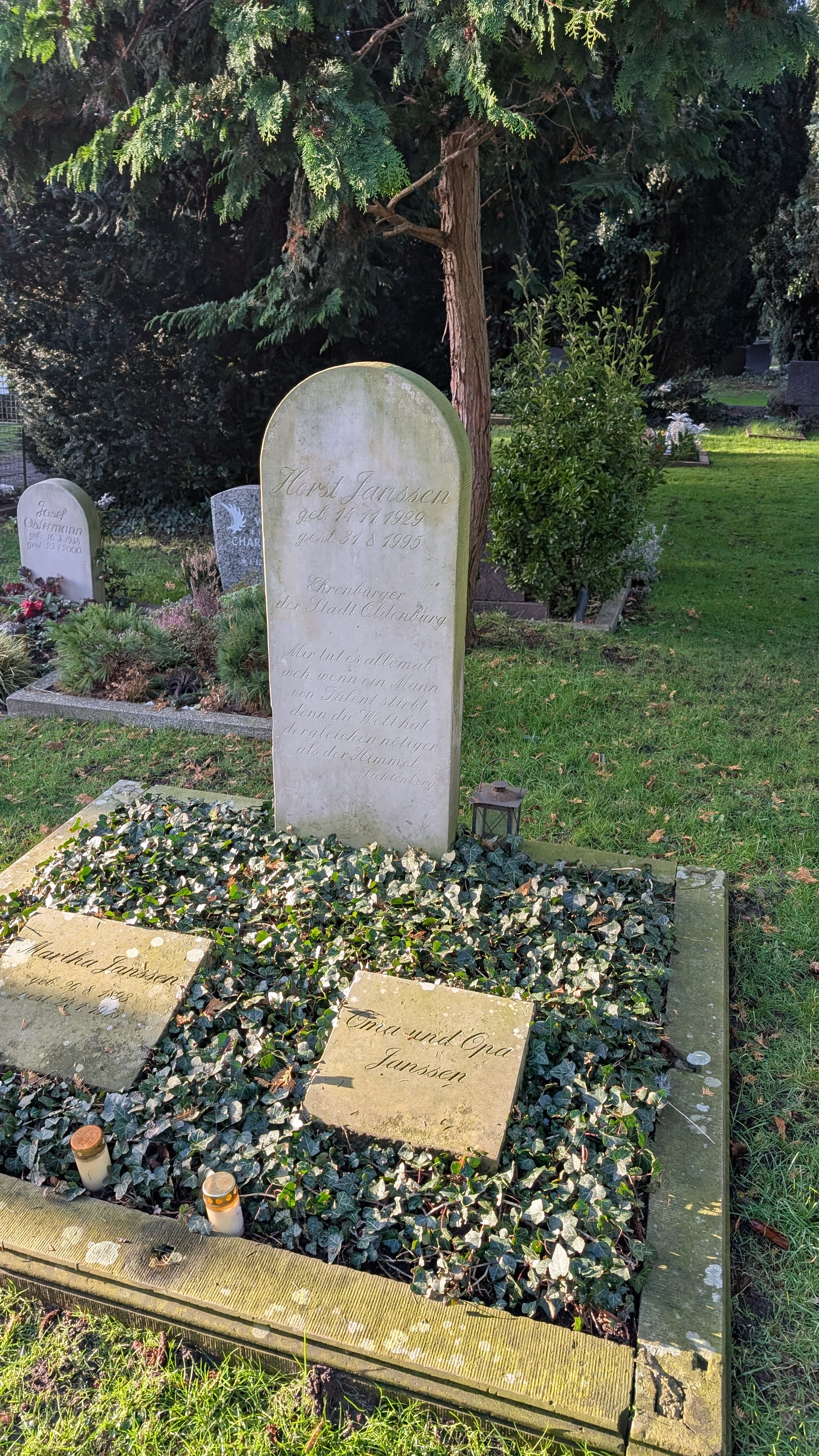
Horst Janssen's grave at the Gertrudenkirchhof in Oldenburg (Lower Saxony) in January 2025

His position as a respected artist was bolstered by winning Hamburg's Edwin Scharff Prize in 1966. The following year, two of the most important people of his youth died, his Aunt Anna and his teacher Alfred Mahlau. Janssen moved to Mühlenberger Weg in Blankenese. The following year, he was divorced from his third wife. His art now dealt with the losses of these years. He won first prize for graphic art at the 1968 Venice Biennale. He began a love affair with Gesche Tietjens. A trip with her to Svanshall, Skåne County, in southern Sweden led to many beautiful drawings of the coastlines. His concentration on landscapes was supported by his return to etching. In 1972, he separated from Tietjen, then pregnant with his child, Adam. In 1973, he had a love affair with Bettina Sartorius. In 1975, he won another prize, the Schiller Prize of the City of Mannheim, where his large drawing retrospective was organized in 1976. In 1977, his work was shown at the documenta VI in Kassel, in 1980 at the Art Institute of Chicago, and in 1982 at Vienna's Albertina.

The city of Oldenburg made him an honorary citizen in 1992.

Horst Janssen died in Hamburg on 31 August 1995 and was buried in Oldenburg in Gertruden Cemetery.

== Awards ==
- 1950: Studienstiftung des deutschen Volkes
- 1952: Lichtwark scholarship, Hamburg (in German)
- 1964: Kunstpreis der Stadt Darmstadt
- 1965: Edwin Scharff Prize, Hamburg
- 1968: Great prize of the Venice Biennale
- 1975: Schiller Prize of the City of Mannheim
- 1978: Biermann Ratjen Medal, Hamburg (in German)
- 1992: Honorary citizenship of Oldenburg
- 2000: Opening of the Horst Janssen Museum in Oldenburg

== Legacy ==
During Janssen's lifetime, his work was shown internationally, for example, in Basel (1966), London (1970), Zürich, Oslo, Göteborg (all in 1971), New York (1974), Turin (1975), Cambridge, Barcelona, Lugano (all 1976), Chicago (1980), travelling exhibition in Japan (1982), travelling exhibition in the U.S. (1983–1985) and Nowosibirsk (1985). More recently, his work has been shown at major museums, such as the Rembrandt House Museum in Amsterdam (2008). An exhibition at the Leopold Museum in Vienna in 2004, "Egon Schiele / Horst Janssen", explored his work in relation to the art of Egon Schiele.

In 2000, the Horst Janssen Museum, an art museum, was opened in Oldenburg. Special exhibitions there have explored his work in relation to other artists, such as Goya. He is represented in the Sammlung zeitgenössischer Kunst der Bundesrepublik Deutschland (Collection of contemporary art of the Federal Republic of Germany) in Bonn.

A biography, Horst Janssen – Eine Biographie (1984), was written by Stefan Blessin, who in 1992, added Horst Janssen – Aus dem Dunkel ins Licht ("Horst Janssen – From Darkness into Light"). In 2001, Janssen's friend Joachim Fest published Horst Janssen. Selbstbildnis von fremder Hand ("Horst Janssen. Self-Portrait in a Foreign Hand") and in 2006, Die schreckliche Lust des Auges. Erinnerungen an Horst Janssen ("The Horrible Pleasure of the Eye. Memories of Horst Janssen"). Janssen's own memoirs were published in 2006 by Gesche Tietjens, titled Summa summarum: Ein Lebenslesebuch ("Summary of Summaries, a Book of Life Reader").

== Catalogues ==
- Wieland Schmied, Carl Vogel: Horst Janssen (with a catalogue of graphic art to 1965 by Carl Vogel), kestnergesellschaft 1965
- Plakat-Kunst-Stücke, 1995, Museum für Kunst und Gewerbe Hamburg, ISBN 3-923848-81-1
- Selbst: Gewörtert, 1995, Museum für Kunst und Gewerbe Hamburg, ISBN 3-923848-63-3
- Drawings and etchings, Claude Bernard Gallery, New York, St. Gertrude, Hamburg, 1991, ISBN 3-923848-35-8
- Das Portrait, 1999, Germanisches Nationalmuseum, ISBN 3-923848-78-1
- Frühe Meisterschaft, 1999, Janssen Kabinett Hamburger Kunsthalle, ISBN 3-922909-47-7
- Uwe Schneede: Zwiesprache – Anspielung und Kopie, St. Gertrude, Hamburg, 1995, ISBN 3-923848-54-4
- Hanno's Tod, 1997, Hamburger Kunsthalle, ISBN 3-923848-71-4
- Hokusai´s Spaziergang, 1998, Hamburger Kunsthalle, ISBN 3-923848-76-5
- Katze blau – 100 Holzschnitte, 2000, Horst Janssen Museum, ISBN 3-923848-91-9
- Janssen sieht Goya, 2001, Horst Janssen Museum, ISBN 3-923848-95-1
- Janssen und die Frauen, 2002, Horst Janssen Museum, ISBN 3-923848-96-X
- Krickelkrakeln und Uhupappen, 2002, Horst Janssen Museum, ISBN 3-935855-01-X
- Horst Janssen und sein Drucker Hartmut Frielinghaus, 2003, Hamburger Kunsthalle, ISBN 3-935855-05-2
- Kunst der Zeichnung, 2003 Horst Janssen Museum, ISBN 3-935855-02-8
- Egon Schiele – Horst Janssen, 2004, Horst Janssen Museum, ISBN 3-935855-06-0
- Gegen die Zeit gezeichnet Blumen und andere Stillleben von Horst Janssen, 2005, Horst Janssen Museum, ISBN 3-89995-257-X
- Horst Janssen und Rembrandt, "Nach IHM Porträts und Landschaften", 2008, Horst Janssen Museum, ISBN 978-3-89995-497-5
- Schon wieder Perlen!, Horst Janssen Sammlung Meyer-Schomann, 2008, Horst Janssen Museum, ISBN 978-3-89995-528-6
- Graphische Naturgewalten – Simon Prades trifft Horst Janssen. AK der Galerie Neosyne, Bd.1, Trier, 2011, ISSN 2192-8401
- Horst Janssen, Das Tier, Verlag St. Gertrude, 1995, ISBN 3-923848-64-1
