= Eske Schlüters =

German video artist

Eske Schlüters (born 1970, Leer, East Frisia) is a German visual, writing and video artist. She graduated from Hochschule für bildende Künste Hamburg in 2004. She lives and works in Hamburg.

Eske Schlüters (1997–2004 at HfbK Hamburg with Eran Schaerf) uses the relationship between narratives, images and imagination as a recurring element in her (audiovisual) installations and photographs. In examining found and researched footage her attention aims primarily at phenomena of vision, perception, the manufacturing of images as well as the emergence of images of past and witnessed events. Her work has been shown in group exhibitions at Bundeskunsthalle Bonn , Museum für Gegenwartskunst Siegen, VOX Montréal and Frankfurter Kunstverein as well as in solo shows at Kunsthalle Lingen (with Katrin Mayer), Kunstverein für die Rheinlande und Westfalen, Düsseldorf and Museum für Gegenwartskunst Siegen and in the public space.

In 2024, together with Tillmann Terbuyken, she realized the project Untitled History for the public space. The work consists of an artificial ruin and an augmented reality with binaural sound.

== Career ==
Eske Schlüters studied at Johann-Wolfgang-Goethe University in Frankfurt/Main from 1990 to 1996, initially majoring in chemistry and French before applying to the Hochschule für bildende Künste, Hamburg in 1997, where she studied until 2004 with Helke Sander, Gisela Bullacher, Eran Schaerf, and Willem Oorebeek.

In 2020, she received her doctorate from the Hochschule für bildende Künste Hamburg with her thesis Alles kann ein Bild von allem sein ("Everything Can Be an Image of Everything"), Passagen, 2021.

== Awards, Grants, Residencies ==
- 2025/26 Scholarship for artists, arts-based researchers, and curators at the VALIE EXPORT Center Linz
- 2025 (2022) Edwin-Scharff prize
- 2020 Stiftung Kunstfonds Kultur
- 2019 Grant ZEIT Stiftung Bucerius
- 2016 Kunstbeutel Hamburg
- time to sync or swim has been mentioned as Eva Birkenstocks "Best of 2016" in Artforum Magazine
- 2014 Pro Exzellenzia Scholarship
- 2009 Villa Romana prize.
- 2008 Grant, Arthur-Boskamp Stiftung
- 2007 Grant Stiftung Kunstfonds
- 2007 Residency, Künstlerstätte Bleckede
- 2005 Golden Cube, Dokumentar- und Videofestival, Kassel

== Solo exhibitions ==
- 2026 Latent Spaces, Kunstraum Memphis, Linz
- 2024 Untitled History (art in public space together with Tillmann Terbuyken), Alter Elbpark Hamburg (still on view)
- 2023 Unpredictable Journeys into the Interior of Time (with Tillmann Terbuyken), reading room of the K.B.W., Warburg-Haus Hamburg.
- 2027 time to sync or swim (with Katrin Mayer), M1, Hohenlockstedt
- 2016 time to sync or swim (with Katrin Mayer), Kunsthalle Lingen
- 2011 La double distance (with Matthias Meyer), Galerie Eva Winkeler, Köln
- 2009 4 weeks – 4 sights, Mikael Andersen Gallery, Berlin
- 2008 Ähnliches und Mögliches — levels of enactment, Kunstverein für die Rheinlande und Westfalen, Düsseldorf
- 2007 Mismatch, Pudelkollektion, Pudel Club Hamburg
- 2006 Sehen als Denken sehen, Museum für Gegenwartskunst, Siegen; Viper, Basel
- 2003 True to You, Gold, Hamburg

== Group exhibitions (Selected) ==
- 2026 Regards sensibles [Sensitive Gazes] – Video works from the Lemaître Collection, Musée d’Art contemporain, Lyon (F)
- 2025 The Mirror Effect – 60 years of Art & Language, as part of Katrin Mayer’s project c0da, Château de Montsoreau, celebrating the 60th anniversary of the Art & Language collective, curated by Lara Pan.
- 2025 From the Cosmos to the Commons, project of city curator Joanna Warsza, Planetarium Hamburg
- 2024 contribution to the exhibition #c0da comptoir #fanny carolsruh of Katrin Mayer, Badischer Kunstverein, Karlsruhe
- 2022 Griffelkunst Editionen, deutschlandweit
- 2021 AudioResources, exhibiton of the Berliner Förderprogramm Künstlerische Forschung, Haus der Statistik, Berlin
- 2019 Supplica per un’ appendice, with Jeewi Lee, Anna Möller, Ketty la Rocca, Lerato Shadi, Kunstraum München
- 2019 Fuzzy Dark Spot, Sammlung Falckenberg, Deichtorhallen, Hamburg
- 2016 Fühle deinen Körper sich von meinem Körper entfernen, Kunstverein Heidelberg
- 2016 Putting Rehearsals to the Test, VOX, Montréal, CA
- 2016 Screening, Les Rencontres Internationales, Haus der Kulturen der Welt, Berlin
- 2016 Screening, Les Rencontres Internationales, Paris, F
- 2015 All tomorrow’s Past, Kunsthaus Hamburg (with Vincent Meessen, Otolith Group, Sharon Hayes, Maya Schweizer, Oliver Laric et al.)
- 2014 Agora & Gabe – Gespenster der Gastfreundschaft, MIET, Thessaloniki, GR
- 2013 Villa Romana 1905-2013, Bundeskunsthalle, Bonn
- 2012 KUNST FILM KINO Le cinéma de l’art, European Kunsthalle, Kunsthochschule für Medien, Köln
- 2012 Lieber Aby Warburg – Was tun mit Bildern?, Museum für Gegenwartskunst Siegen (Katalog)
- 2012 Supplica per un’ Appendice, (with Anna Möller, Henrik Olesen, Jacopo Milani, Ketty la Rocca), Villa Romana, Florenz, IT
- 2012 Demonstrationen. Vom Werden normativer Ordnungen, Kunstverein Frankfurt (catalogue)
- 2010 Insert – Never The Same Colour, Kunstverein Harburger Bahnhof, Hamburg
- 2010 Seams and Notches, Flo Gaertner, Heiko Karn, Katrin Mayer, Eske Schlüters, Reception, Berlin
- 2010 Alloro, Villa Romana PreisträgerInnen, 2009/10, Haus am Waldsee, Berlin
- 2009 Fake or feint, Szenario #6, Berlin Carré, Berlin
- 2009 Videonale 12, Bonn
- 2008 To Show is to Preserve, Halle für Kunst, Lüneburg
- 2008 Stile der Stadt: Videopanel 2008 – Videoform Filmform, Hamburg (curated by Dirck Möllmann)
- 2007 Kronacher Videopreis, Kronach
- 2007 ZwischenFiguren – remember after all: there are such things! (with Katrin Mayer), rraum, Hamburg
- 2007 ZwischenFiguren or dependency is a marvelous thing (with Katrin Mayer), White Space, Zürich, CH
- 2007 Frozen Cirrostratus, SAEKKERS Gallery, Eindhoven, NL
- 2006 Academy/Akademie – Learning from Art, (Modulator update), MuHKA, Antwerpen (catalogue)
- 2005 Akademie, (Modulator), Kunstverein Hamburg
- 2004 Deutschland sucht…, Kölnischer Kunstverein, Köln (catalogue)

== Weblinks ==
- http://www.eske-schlueters.de/, Website of the artist
