= Goslarer Kaiserring =

German art award

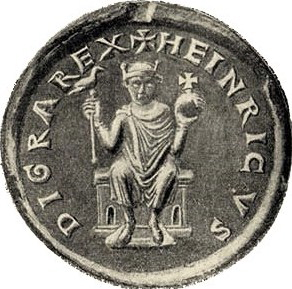
The design of the ring is based on the seal of Henry IV, who was probably born in Goslar.

Since 1975, the Goslarer Kaiserring (German pronunciation: [ˈɡɔslaʁɐ ˈkaɪzɐʁɪŋ], lit. 'Imperial Ring of Goslar') award has been given, by the city of Goslar, to a distinguished international artist of modern and contemporary art. The award is for artists whose work has given the contemporary art significant impetus. The prize consists of an aquamarine set in gold, in which the seal of Henry IV, Holy Roman Emperor (1050–1106) is engraved. It is made every year by the goldsmith Hadfried Rinke from Worpswede.

== Recipients ==
- 1975: Henry Moore
- 1976: Max Ernst
- 1977: Alexander Calder
- 1978: Victor Vasarely
- 1979: Joseph Beuys
- 1980: Jean Tinguely (acceptance refused)
- 1981: Richard Serra
- 1982: Max Bill
- 1983: Günther Uecker
- 1984: Willem de Kooning
- 1985: Eduardo Chillida
- 1986: Georg Baselitz
- 1987: Christo
- 1988: Gerhard Richter
- 1989: Mario Merz
- 1990: Anselm Kiefer
- 1991: Nam June Paik
- 1992: Rebecca Horn
- 1993: Roman Opalka
- 1994: Bernd and Hilla Becher
- 1995: Cy Twombly
- 1996: Dani Karavan
- 1997: Franz Gertsch
- 1998: Ilya Kabakov
- 1999: Cindy Sherman
- 2000: Sigmar Polke
- 2001: Christian Boltanski
- 2002: Jenny Holzer
- 2003: William Kentridge
- 2004: Katharina Sieverding
- 2005: Robert Longo
- 2006: Jörg Immendorff
- 2007: Matthew Barney
- 2008: Andreas Gursky
- 2009: Bridget Riley
- 2010: David Lynch
- 2011: Rosemarie Trockel
- 2012: John Baldessari
- 2013: Ólafur Elíasson
- 2014: Wiebke Siem
- 2015: Boris Mikhailov
- 2016: Jimmie Durham
- 2017: Isa Genzken
- 2018: Wolfgang Tillmans
- 2019: Barbara Kruger
- 2020: Hans Haacke
- 2021: Adrian Piper
- 2022: Isaac Julien
- 2023: Yury Albert and Vadim Zakharov
- 2024: Miriam Cahn
- 2025: Katharina Fritsch
- 2026: Gabriele Stötzer
