= Wiebke Siem =

German mixed media artist (born 1954)

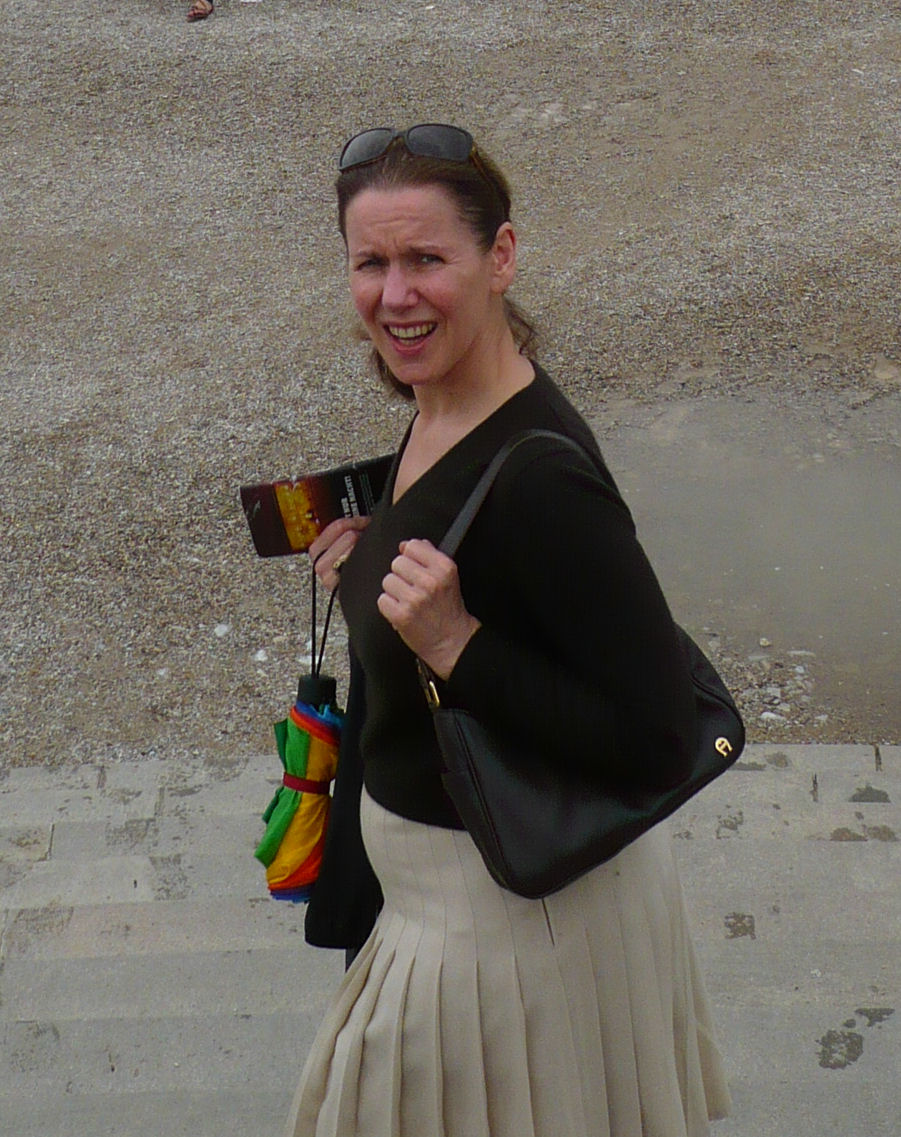
Wiebke Siem

Wiebke Siem (born 1954 in Kiel) is a German mixed media artist of German and Polish heritage, winner of the prestigious Goslarer Kaiserring in 2014 as "one of the most innovative and original artists who has never compromised in their art and whose sculptures have a tremendous aura and presence because they mix the familiar and the unfamiliar, the known and the unknown".

== Career ==
Her work includes installations, sculptures, textiles and fashion objects which consistently reference art, fashion and design of the 20th century. In combining traditional handicrafts such as fashion and textiles with masculine-dominated ones such as fine arts and object design, Siem questions the role of the creator by insisting on the role of the woman not just as maker but also as author. Her works, often sewed or carved, are intensively labour-based and often deal with themes of domesticity and the elaborate function which women perform in the social sphere.

The majority of Siem's early work made use of the preceding German artistic generation as source material by consistently quoting and borrowing aesthetic elements albeit in a satirizing and ironic manner. Over the course of her career, Siem has also drawn from a wide variety of ethnographic sources including puppets, traditional furniture design, and European folk costumes as well as elements of anthropology and sociology The artist lives and works in Berlin.

== Education ==
From 1979 to 1984, Siem studied at the University of Fine Arts in Hamburg. Siem herself was appointed Visiting Professor from 2000–2001 and Professor of Sculpture from 2002 to 2008. During this time Siem was also a member of the Deutscher Künstlerbund.

== Work ==
Siem developed her first artworks in the form of dresses, murals and hats during and after her studies in Hamburg between 1983 and 1988. In these works, Siem makes use of 'traditional' female domains such as sewing and fashion to satirize and critically evaluate the influences of the influential artistic generation which preceded her. For example, her 'clothes-works' of the early 1980s are an answer to the textile works of the German artist Franz Erhard Walther by means of the designation "objects for use", a term which Walther himself used in describing some of his wearable fabric sculptures. Using eye-catching patterns partly offset on the surface of the dress, as if the parts had been carelessly sewn together, Siem creates a sense of formal alienation which visually lifts clothes designed for everyday use. Similarly, murals which were created by Siem in the same period reference the large-scale wall paintings by the German artist Blinky Palermo. Instead of composing a monochrome painting as Palermo would have done, Siem paints a marble imitation stone, as one would in a theater set. These wall works were placed in the public space such staircases, office halls, or cafés and remained there without being marked as a work of art, in some cases for years. Siem's 'hat works', on the other hand, are wearable objects which are not discernable as artworks apart from their uniqueness. In fact, Siem's textile works were only exhibited as art objects some years later, in the gallery Chantal Crousel in Paris in 1995.

=== The Four Workgroups ===
From 1989 to 1997, Siem created four groups of works which occupy a central place in her oeuvre. The first group of works, created from 1989 to 1993, is composed of dresses, hats, bags, and shoes. As in her previous works, the artist's objects blur the line between art and fashion since it is both possible to wear them and consider them under objective aesthetic terms. As potential prototypes, they are normally exhibited in the style of a merchandise presentation one would find in a fashion store.

The objects of the second group of works (1991–1994) are more ambivalent. The terms used to describe the objects – clothes, hairstyles, shawls, trolleys – suggests fashion or lifestyle objects, but the group of works itself resembles the collection of a cultural-historical museum. The 'clothes' are hard, like armor, and the 'hairstyles' (made of stone) are not actually possible to wear or even carry unassisted. The 'trolleys' are heavy wooden models similar to ones that might be found in an agricultural museum. The 'shawls' are thick tapestries made of felt. Hence the understanding of the female role is subverted and rehashed in the form of 'superficial' feminine objects ever which present themselves as increasingly absurd.

Similarly, the third group of works (1993–1997) is also reminiscent of a museum collection. Untitled (6 Masks) is made up of six large furry outfits resembling traditional costumes of folk characters from the Alpine regions of Germany, Switzerland, and Austria. In the group Untitled (7 Masks) the artist has reproduced her own face in seven different facial expressions in reference to the 18th century German-Austrian sculptor Franz Xaver Messerschmidt. The group Untitled (42 Stones) ironically performs the formal canon of modernist sculptures in papier-mâché (visually referencing figures such as Hans Arp and Henry Moore) in 42 individual examples.

The fourth group of works (1995–1997) consists of an installation which creates the appearance of a huge room. A group of life-size dolls, figurines and wooden objects appear comically small, like toys, in the center of an oversize carpet. The dolls reference classical European doll forms as well as the sculptures and theater costumes of the Dadaist Oskar Schlemmer.

=== Rustic Furniture ("Bauernmöbel") ===
Wiebke Siem developed the series 'Rustic Furniture' during her first residency in the UK. All objects are 1:1 copies of existing German farm furniture of the 18th and 19th centuries in various private and public European collections. The objects create a sense of alienation due to the fact that the replica furniture has been painted brand new. They seem strange to the viewer, despite being lifted from a familiar cultural-historical background. This commentary on political and sociological framework raises the question of what can be considered strictly 'foreign' within the public sphere and what can be considered culturally one's own.

=== Costume Masks ("Maskenkostüme") ===
The mask costumes (2000/2001), mostly created during Siem's second stay in England, refer to objects of non-European cultures in preserved European museum collections, such as mask costumes of the African or the Pacific region. The carved masks, however, also make clear references to European modernism. (Modigliani, Schlemmer). Siem points out that the art of non-European space is a resource of European modernity.

=== The Counterfeiter ("Die Fälscherin") ===
Between 2005 and 2009, Siem worked on a group of larger installations that were shown in 2009 at the Neues Museum Nürnberg under the exhibition title Die Fälscherin. In pre-and post-war room furnishings and furniture, large fabric sculptures are placed as actors in surreal domestic scenes. Anxiety, vision and comedy are central elements of the main installation, which consists of an "Africa collection" made up of household items obsessively occupying the entire room.

=== Hot Skillet Mama ===
With the sculptures that have been created since 2010, Wiebke Siem freed her practice from the intricately crafted sculptures that have characterized her work for decades. She began to assemble her sculptures from simple household objects before working on them to give them a uniform surface. As disembodied sculptures they are not unlike skeletons and hang like puppets from the ceiling. As with many of Siem's works, the sculptures also express themes of alienation – the transformation of something familiar into something foreign.

In the studio installation Der Traum der Dinge - The Dream of Things (at the K20 – Collection Nordrhein-Westfalen in Düsseldorf) Siem invited the visitors to assemble and hang household appliances into new figures, effectively creating new artwork out of common domestic tools by means of audience participation.

== Bursaries and awards ==
- 2014 Goslarer Kaiserring
- 2013 Scholarship of the Internationalen Kunstlerhauses Villa Concordia, Bamberg
- 2011 Publication Grant, Kunstfonds Foundation, Bonn
- 2002 Edwin Scharff Prize, Hamburg
- 2001/2002 Scholarship of the Berliner Senatsverwaltung for Culture at Delfina Studio Trust, London
- 1999/2000 Sculpture Fellowship, The Henry Moore Foundation, Bristol, England
- 1996/1997 Residency, Künstlerhaus Bethanien, Berlin
- 1995/1996 Scholarship, Cité internationale des arts, Paris
- 1994 Scholarship for visual art, Stiftung Kunstfonds Bonn
- 1994 Publication grant, Alfried Krupp von Bohlen and Halbach Foundation
- 1991 Scholarship, Akademie Schloss Solitude, Stuttgart
- 1990 Visual arts grant, Kulturbehörde Hamburg

== Solo exhibitions ==
2023

- The Maximum Minimum, Kunstmuseum Bonn

2016

- K20 – Kunstsammlung Nordrhein-Westfalen (im Lanir), Wiebke Siem – Der Traum der Dinge

2014

- Wilhelm Lehmbruck Museum, Duisburg

2013

- Johnen Galerie, Berlin.
- Geister, Installation in the stairhous of the Kunsthalle within the framework of the exhibition Gute Gesellschaft, Kunsthalle zu Kiel

2011

- Wiebke Siem im Atelier Karin Sander, Studio Karin Sander, Berlin

2009

- Die Fälscherin, Neues Museum in Nürnberg, Nuremberg
- Werkgruppe, Ständige Sammlung, Neues Museum in Nürnberg, Nuremberg

2007

- Niema tego złego coby na dobry nie wyzło, Johnen Galerie, Berlin

2004/05

- Maskenkostüme, Galerie der Moderne, Kunsthalle Hamburg

2002

- Galerie Lindig in Paludetto, Nuremberg
- 2. Werkgruppe, Ständige Sammlung, Neues Museum in Nürnberg, Nuremberg
- Frith Street Gallery, London (mit Massimo Bartolini)

2001

- Collection, The Henry Moore Institute, Leeds, England

2000

- Spike Island, Bristol, England
- Galerie Johnen & Schöttle, Cologne
- Exhibition for the Künstlerhaus Bethanien, Art Forum, Berlin

1997

- Castello di Rivara, Torino, Italy
- Kunsthalle Bern, Switzerland
- Künstlerhaus Bethanien, Berlin

1996

- Duchamps Urenkel, Bonner Kunstverein, Bonn
- Galerie Johnen & Schöttle, Cologne

1995

- Gallery Chantal Crousel, Paris

1994

- Portikus, Frankfurt am Main
- Galerie Johnen & Schöttle, Cologne

1993

- Museum Robert Walser, Hotel Krone, Gais, Switzerland
- Galerie Johnen & Schöttle, Cologne

1991

- Akademie Schloss Solitude, Stuttgart
- Kunstraum Neue Kunst, Hannover

1990

- Westwerk, Hamburg

== Group exhibitions ==
2017

- Sculptures by Wiebke Siem and Ann Veronica Janssens, Galerie Esther Schipper, Berlin

2013

- Just what is it that makes today's homes so different so appealing, New Arts Centre, Salisbury
- Weltreise, Kunst aus Deutschland unterwegs, Werke aus dem Kunstbestand des Ifa1949 – heute, ZKM, Museum für Moderne Kunst, Karlsruhe
- Regionalismus Salzburger Kunstverein, Salzburg

2011

- Säen und Jäten, Cobra Museum, Netherlands
- Künstlersammler: Mona Hatoum, Arturo Herrera, Karin Sander, Kunsthalle Koidl, Berlin

2010

- Konversationsstücke Akt II, Johnen Galerie, Berlin

2009

- Säen und Jäten, Städtische Galerie Ravensburg, Städtische Galerie Wolfsburg
- Zeigen, Eine Audiotour durch Berlin von Karin Sander, Temporäre Kunsthalle Berlin

2008

- Auf der Erbse, Galerie der Stadt Sindelfingen
- We are Stardust we are golden, Galerie Johnen + Schöttle, Cologne

2001

- Un-wearable Fashion as Sculpture, Museum für Angewandte Kunst, Cologne
- Through the Looking Glass, Galerie M+R. Fricke, Berlin
- Blondies and Brownies, Aktionsforum Praterinsel, Munich

2000

- Solitude im Museum, Staatsgalerie Stuttgart, Musee d`Art Moderne de Saint Etienne, France
- Anyone could be anyone else in most ways, Galerie Brigitte Trotha, Frankfurt am Main

1999

- Kunstmuseum Wolfsburg, Germany
- Triennale der Kleinplastik, Forum der Südwest LB, Stuttgart
- Global Fun, Museum Schloss Morsbroich, Leverkusen
- Zoom, a view on German contemporary Art, Villa Merkel, Esslingen, Städtisches Museum Abteiberg, Mönchengladbach
- Kunsthalle Kiel

1998

- The House in the Woods, Center for Contemporary Arts, Glasgow, Scotland
- Dundee Contemporary Arts, Scotland
- Ormeau Baths Gallery, Belfast, Northern Ireland
- Kunst und Papier auf dem Laufsteg, Fashionshow, Deutsche Guggenheim, Berlin
- Addressing the Century, 100 Years of Art and Fashion, Hayward Gallery, London

1997

- Art/Fashion, Guggenheim Museum Soho, New York

1996

- Bodyscape, Barbara Gross Galerie, Munich
- Private View, The Bowes Museum, Barnard Castle, England
- Propositions, Musee Departemental de Rochechouard, France
- Linien und Zeichen, Künstlerhaus Bethanien, Berlin
- Il tempo e la Moda, Biennale di Firenze, Italy

1995

- Leiblicher Logos, Staatsgalerie Stuttgart, Altes Museum, Berlin, Castello di Rivoli, Torino, Italy and other international locations
- Giovani Artisti Tedesci, Castello di Rivara, Torino, Italy
- Zimmerdenkmäler, Bochum
- Aperto 95, Le Nouveau Musee Villeurbanne, Lyon, France

1994

- Suture – Phantasmen der Vollkommenheit, Salzburger Kunstverein, Salzburg
- Life is too much, Galerie des Archives, Paris
- Villa Pams – Le Jardin des Senteurs, Collioure, France
- Bad zur Sonne – 100 Umkleidekabinen, Steirischer Herbst, Graz, Austria
- Trans, Galerie Chantal Crousel, Paris
- Expose, Institut für Auslandsbeziehungen, Stuttgart

1992

- Kunstraum neue Kunst, Hannover
- Le Témoin Oculiste, Centre Corégraphique Nationale de Franche-Comté, Belfort, France
- Qui, Quoi, Ou?, Un regard sur l'Art en Allemagne 1992, Museé d'Art Moderne de la Ville de Paris
- Just what is it, that makes today's home so different, so appealing, Galerie Jennifer Flay, Paris
- Chambre 763, Hotel Carlton Palace, Paris

1991

- Hamburger Arbeitsstipendien, Halle K3, Hamburg
- Rund um die Kuppel, Württembergischer Kunstverein, Stuttgart

1990

- Galerie Jürgen Becker, Hamburg

== Selected sculptures in public collections ==
- Hamburger Kunsthalle
- Staatsgalerie Stuttgart
- Neues Museum Nürnberg
- Fonds National, Frankreich
- FRAC Franche-Comté, Frankreich
- FRAC Dole, Frankreich
- FRAC d´Alsace, Selestat
- Landesbank Baden-Württemberg, Stuttgart
- IFA Collection, Stuttgart
- Deutsche Bank Collection, Frankfurt/Main
- Rudolf Bossi Collection, Zürich
- Lother Schirmer Collection, München

== Publications ==
1991

- Wiebke Siem: Kleider, Hüte, Taschen, Schuhe, Texts from Wiebke Siem and Jean Paul; Catalogue to the exhibition in Schloss Solitude. Hrsg.: Jean-Baptiste Joly, Akademie Schloss Solitude, Stuttgart, 1991

1994

- Wiebke Siem: Kleider, Frisuren, Tücher, Wagen, Texts from Wiebke Siem and Adelbert von Chamisso; Catalogue to the exhibition in Portikus. Hrsg.: Kasper König, Portikus, Frankfurt am Main, 1994

1996

- Wiebke Siem, Text from Wiebke Siem and Annelie Pohlen; Brochure to the exhibition. Hrsg.: Bonner Kunstverein 1996.

1997

- Wiebke Siem – Kunsthalle Bern, Texts from Wiebke Siem and Ulrich Loock; Catalogue to the exhibition. Hrsg.: Kunsthalle Bern, Schweiz, 1997
- Turmzimmer, Text from Peter Herbstreuth; Brochure to exhibition in Künstlerhaus Bethanien, Berlin, 1997
- Wiebke Siem: Kunsthalle Bern, Castello di Rivara, Wiebke Siem, 1997, ISBN 9783857801143

2000

- Juliana Engberg and Wiebke Siem: A new Project by Wiebke Siem, Text from Kay Campbell; Brochure to the exhibition in Spike Island. Hrsg.: Spike Island, Bristol, England, 2000

2007

- Wiebke Siem: Niema tego zlego coby na dobre nie wyszlo, Text von Jens Asthoff; Catalogue to the exhibition. Hrsg.: Johnen Galerie, Berlin 2007

2013

- Wiebke Siem: Arbeiten 1983–2013. Hrsg.: Melitta Kliege and Angelika Nollert, Verlag für Moderne Kunst Nürnberg, 2013
- Anna, Susanne, Markus Heinzelmann, and Oliver Zybok. Untragbar: Mode Als Skulptur. Köln: Siemens Kulturprigramm, Museum Für Angewandte Kunst, 2001.

2014

- Of Bits: Pieces and the Whole, Works from 1999 to 2014. Herzogenrath, Wulf, Penelope Curtis, Michael Scuffil, and Wiebke Siem Goslar: Mönchehaus-Museum, 2014.

2015

- Wiebke Siem. Söke Dinkla, Bettina Ruhrberg, and Michael Krajewski. Duisburg: Lehmbruck Museum, 2015. ISBN 9783862064489
