= Edwin Scharff =

German sculptor

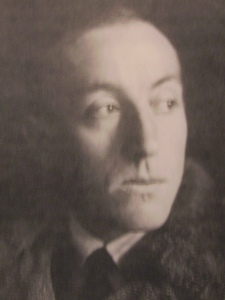
- Born: 21 March 1887; Neu-Ulm
- Died: 18 March 1955 (aged 67); Hamburg

Olympic medal record

Art competitions
Bronze medal – third place	1928 Amsterdam	Sculpture Medals

Edwin Scharff (21 March 1887 – 18 May 1955) was a German sculptor. He was born in Neu-Ulm and died in Hamburg.

Edwin Scharff, Großer Schreitender Mann (Man of the Border), sculpture, before 1920

== Biography ==
Scharff attended the Kunstgewerbeschule (1902–03) in Munich and studied painting at the Akademie der Bildenden Künste from 1904 to 1907. He lived in Paris between 1912 and 1913, where he was influenced by the work of Aristide Maillol and Auguste Rodin. After serving in the German army during World War One, where he was badly wounded, he became a professor of sculpture at the Vereinigte Staatsschulen für Freie und Angewandte Kunst, Berlin (1923). He was removed by the Nazis in 1933, after which he found a position at the Kunstakademie in Düsseldorf (1934–1937).

In 1928 he won a bronze medal in the art competitions of the Olympic Games for his "Médaille pour les Jeux Olympiques" ("Olympic medals").

=== Nazi era ===
After the Nazi seizure of power, Scharff was placed on compulsory leave from his teaching position at the Vereinigte Staatsschulen für freie und angewandte Kunst in Berlin in April 1933. According to art historian Wolfgang Ruppert, the accusations against him concerned his activities in Munich during the German Revolution of 1918–1919. Scharff was accused of having participated in the Munich Artists' Council in 1918–19 and of having been seen wearing a red armband during the council period.

In a statement to the Prussian Minister of Science, Art and National Education dated 2 May 1933, Scharff wrote that, to his knowledge, his suspension was based on the allegation that he had "engaged in communist activity" in Munich during the revolution of 1918–19. He rejected the allegation and described himself as apolitical. Several friends, colleagues and institutions subsequently submitted petitions disputing the allegation of communist activity and presenting Scharff as politically acceptable to the new regime. On 28 April 1933, the Kunstverein Ulm stated that Scharff had been "politically on the right" since 1929 and had "sympathised with the NSDAP". Two days later, Munich Academy professor Karl Caspar wrote that Scharff had told him as early as 1931 that, "out of inner conviction", he supported "Adolf Hitler's national movement". On 1 May 1933, Scharff joined the Nazi Party.

In November 1933, Scharff was transferred to the Kunstakademie Düsseldorf, enabling him to continue teaching. According to art historian Stefanie Johnen, he took over the "previously purged position" of Ewald Mataré, who had lost his teaching position during the National Socialist personnel and cultural-policy restructuring of the academy. Scharff remained active in the public art and exhibition system and was a member of the Reich Chamber of Fine Arts. Several exhibition participations during the Nazi period are documented; as late as 1940 he was represented in the exhibition Der Deutsche Westen. Malerei und Plastik aus der Gegenwart. Junge Kunst im Deutschen Westen. Jahresschau 1939/40 in Münster.

For the 1937 Reichsausstellung Schaffendes Volk in Düsseldorf, Scharff created the monumental Rossebändiger ("Horse Tamers") groups at the main entrance to the exhibition grounds. The sculptures were not yet completed when the exhibition opened in May 1937. Photographs of them were temporarily displayed in the Munich exhibition Entartete Kunst later that year, but were subsequently removed with the explanation that their inclusion had been a mistake.

At the same time, numerous earlier works by Scharff were confiscated from German museums in 1937 as part of the Nazi campaign against so-called "degenerate art". Three of his works were shown in the Munich Entartete Kunst exhibition, and 46 confiscated works were subsequently destroyed.

In March 1938, Scharff's Nazi Party membership was annulled because of his wife's partly Jewish ancestry. According to Ruppert, Scharff lost his teaching position in Düsseldorf in 1939 but was initially able to continue working as a freelance artist. In 1940, the Reich Chamber of Fine Arts prohibited him from further professional artistic activity.

=== Post-war period ===
After the end of the Second World War, Scharff was rehabilitated and in 1946 was appointed to teach at the Landeskunstschule in Hamburg, where he continued to work and teach until his death in 1955. In 1955, the year of his death, his work was included in the first documenta exhibition in Kassel. His hometown of Neu-Ulm commemorates him with the Edwin Scharff Museum and the Edwin-Scharff-Haus cultural and congress centre, while the city of Hamburg has awarded the annual Edwin Scharff Prize for visual artists since 1955.
