= Jochen Lempert =

German photographer (born 1958)

Jochen Lempert (born 1958 in Moers) is a German photographer whose work is about the world of nature and animals.

Lempert first studied as a biologist before turning to photography in the early 1990s. Accordingly, his pictures are marked with scientific aspects, not only referring to his motives but more to the whole process of photography.

He has built his reputation on scientific publications. His work is in the collection of the German state. In 2005 he was the winner of the Edwin Scharff Prize.

In 2010 he will contribute to national and international exhibitions. The first major survey of Lempert's photography outside of Germany, titled "Trabalho de Campo" ("Field Work"), was held at the Culturgest in Lisbon, Portugal, 7 February through 10 May 2010.

== Exhibitions ==
- 'Jochen Lempert', Contemporary Art Museum St. Louis, St. Louis (solo), 2010
- 'Jochen Lempert', Museum Ludwig, Cologne (solo), 2010
- 'Jochen Lempert', ProjecteSD Barcelona, Barcelona (solo), 2010
- 'Field Guide: Photographs by Jochen Lempert', Cincinnati Art Museum, Cincinnati, 17 October 2015 – 6 March 2016
- 'Jochen Lempert', C/O Berlin, May 13 – September 7, 2023
