= Anna and Bernhard Blume =

German art photographers, (1936–2020), (1937–2011)

- Anna and Bernhard Blume, c. 2000
- Known for: Art photography
- Awards: Konrad-von-Soest-Preis; Edwin Scharff Prize; Berliner Kunstpreis

Anna Blume (née Helming; 21 April 1936 – 18 June 2020) and Bernhard Johannes Blume (8 September 1937 – 1 September 2011) were German art photographers. They created sequences of large black-and-white photos of staged scenes in which they appeared themselves, with objects taking on a "life" of their own. Their works have been shown internationally in exhibitions and museums, including New York's MoMA. They are regarded as "among the pioneers of staged photography".

== Anna Blume ==
Born Anna Helming in Bork, Westphalia, Prussia, Germany, on 21 April 1936, (Note: Only a birth year given in biographies of the artists as a duo: 1936 but most often 1937) she later described her childhood as happy. She studied art at the Staatliche Kunstakademie in Düsseldorf from 1960 to 1965, like her future husband. When they got married in 1966, she enjoyed having the same name as Kurt Schwitters' imaginary figure, Anna Blume. The couple lived and worked together in Cologne. She gave birth to twin girls in 1967. Until 1985 she worked as a crafts and arts teacher at a Gymnasium.

Anna Blume spent the last months of her life in Bork, her birthplace, living with her daughter Hedwig. She died on 18 June 2020 after a long illness at age 84.

== Bernhard Blume ==
Bernhard Johannes Blume was born in Dortmund, Westphalia, Prussia, Germany, in 1937. He studied art at the Staatliche Kunstakademie in Düsseldorf from 1960 to 1965, with Joseph Beuys among others. He studied philosophy at the University of Cologne from 1967 to 1970, and later worked as a teacher of art and philosophy. In 1984 he took part in the exhibition Von hier aus – Zwei Monate neue deutsche Kunst in Düsseldorf. Beginning in 1987 he was Professor für Freie Kunst und Visuelle Kommunikation (professor of free art and visual communication) at the Hochschule für bildende Künste Hamburg.

He died in Cologne on 1 September 2011.

== Works created together ==
Anna and Bernhard Blume together created installations, sequences of large photo scenes and, mostly in the 1990s, Polaroids. Both created drawings. They staged and photographed scenes in which they appeared themselves, with objects taking on a "life" of their own. According to the Deutsche Börse Photography Foundation, their process was to create their picture sequences together and complete all related tasks without outside help. That included designing the sets and costumes, developing the negatives, and producing enlargements; at each stage the artwork was refined, polished and painted. Anna said: "Wir malen mit der Kamera, und diese malerische Arbeit findet auch noch im Labor statt." (We paint with our camera, and this painterly work continues in the lab, too.) The images were produced without the aid of digital manipulation or post-production montages. Taking pictures of a "flying, crashing, and swirling world", the artists used safety features such as ropes, nets and mattresses.

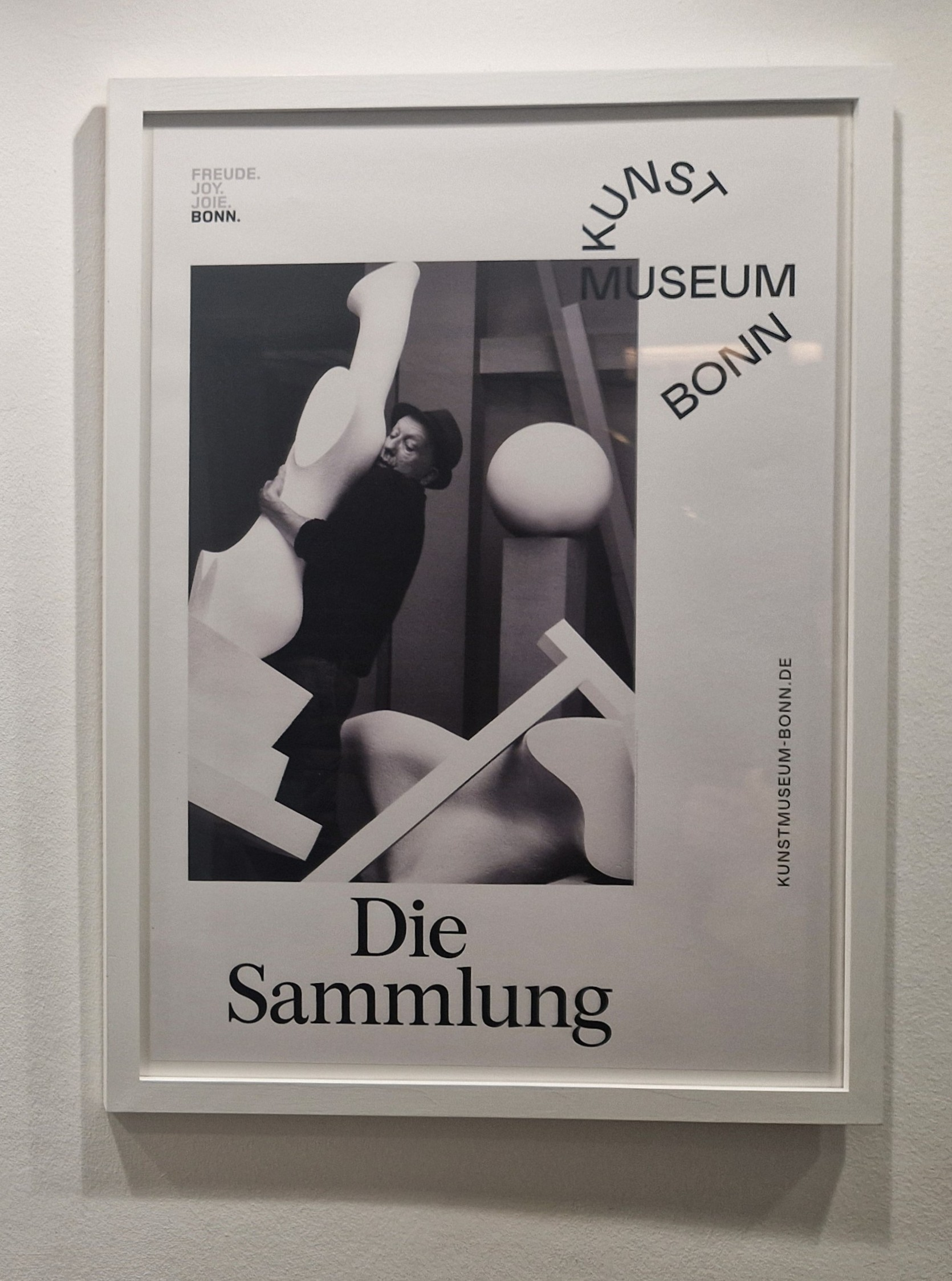
Kunstmuseum Bonn, 2026 collection poster

Their sequence Vasenekstasen (Vase Extasy) was shown at the Museum für Moderne Kunst in Frankfurt. In 1989 MoMA in New York presented their works in a solo show, including Küchenkoller (Kitchen Frenzy, 1986), Opposites D (1989) and Demonstrative Identification with the universe (1971).

In 2004, their Polaroids taken from 1988 to 2000 were published as a book, Das Glück ist ohne Pardon / Joy knows no mercy. They treated the genre of the artist's self-portrait to a transformation, distorting their faces with trivial objects such as coat hangers and household utensils, in order to "put to rest the myth of the portrait and the autonomy of the subject it seeks to convey."

Several works have been exhibited at the Museum Ludwig in Cologne, which in 2005 showed Kreuzweg (Stations of the Cross), a sequence from Transzendentaler Konstruktivismus (Transcendental Constructivism), in connection with the World Youth Day 2005 in Cologne. In 2008 Reine Vernunft (Pure Reason) was presented at the Hamburger Bahnhof in Berlin. It was their first comprehensive appearance in the capital. According to the museum, the works provide "an overview of the ironical and philosophical strategy of this artistic team" and show "intensive dedication to a continuous process of self-experimentation", with the Blumes having "performed groundwork on the nature of German existence" by investigating "'home sweet home' for every conceivable form of misery" rather than entering the wider world.

In 2009, their work appeared in the Berlin Gropiusbau at the exhibition "Sixty years. Sixty works", commemorating the 60th anniversary of the creation of the Federal Republic of Germany. In 2010, several works were shown at the Kunstmuseum Bonn in "Der Westen leuchtet / Eine Standortbestimmung der Kunstlandschaft des Rheinlandes" (The Luminous West / A site assessment of the art landscape in the Rhineland), presenting artists of the Rhineland.

In 2011, the first exhibition of their work after the death of Bernhard Blume, "Trans-Skulptur" in Berlin, was introduced by their friend Bazon Brock. He also spoke on 21 April 2016 at an exhibition Transcendental Constructivism of both artists at the Kolumba in Cologne, which showed their work in several rooms and ran from 2015 to 2016.

=== Works ===
This list of titles and translations is based on the listing for Anna and Bernhard Blume by the Museums of North Rhine-Westphalia.

- 1977 Ödipale Komplikationen? (Oedipal Complications?)
- 1977 Fliegender Teppich (Flying Carpet)
- 1984 Wahnzimmer (Delusion Chamber)
- 1985 Küchenkoller (Kitchen Frenzy)
- 1985/86 Trautes Heim (Sweet Home)
- 1987 Vasenekstasen (Vase Extasy)
- 1986 Mahlzeit (Meal)
- 1982–90 Im Wald (In the Forest)
- 1990 gegenseitig (Opposites), Polaroids
- 1994/95 Transzendentaler Konstruktivismus (Transcendental Constructivism)
- 2003/04 Abstrakte Kunst (Abstract Art)
- 2004 Das Glück ist ohne Pardon / Joy knows no mercy (book)

=== Exhibitions ===
Exhibitions included:

- 1977 documenta 6, Kassel (Bernhard Blume)
- 1984 Von hier aus – Zwei Monate neue deutsche Kunst in Düsseldorf
- 1988 Shakespeare-House in Cologne, Wahnzimmer installation, Bernhard Johannes Blume und Martin Eckrich
- 1988 DuMont Kunsthalle, Cologne, Made in Cologne
- 1989 Museum of Modern Art, New York
- 1991 Museum für Moderne Kunst, Frankfurt
- 1992 Deichtorhallen Hamburg, Anna und Bernhard Blume – Zu Hause und im Wald
- 1993 Landesmuseum Münster
- 1995 Kunsthalle Bremen
- 1996 Milwaukee Art Museum
- 1997 kestnergesellschaft, Hannover
- 1997/1998 Centre national de la photographie, Paris
- 2000 Museum Küppersmühle, Duisburg
- 2002 Folkwang Museum Essen
- 2003 Kunsthalle Göppingen
- 2005 Museum Ludwig, Cologne: Kreuzweg
- 2005 Galerie nationale du Jeu de Paume, Paris
- 2006 Museum am Ostwall, Dortmund: de-konstruktiv (Retrospective)
- 2007 Haus Konstruktiv, Zürich: de-konstruktiv
- 2008 Hamburger Bahnhof, Museum für Gegenwart, Berlin: Reine Vernunft (Pure Reason)
- 2010 Kunstmuseum Bonn, several works in Der Westen leuchtet
- 2011 Galerie Buchmann, Berlin: Akionsmetaphern
- 2015 Kolumba, Cologne: Transcendental Constructivism
- 2015 Centre Pompidou, Paris: La photographie transcendantale

== Awards ==
- 1990 Konrad von Soest Prize
- 1996 Edwin Scharff Prize of Hamburg
- 2000 Berliner Kunstpreis (Berlin Art Prize)

== Sources ==
- Catalogue of documenta 6
  - Vol. 1: "Malerei, Plastik/Environment, Performance"
  - Vol. 2: "Fotografie, Film, Video"
  - Vol. 3: "Handzeichnungen, Utopisches Design, Bücher". Kassel 1977 ISBN 3-920453-00-X
- Honnef, Klaus: 150 Jahre Fotografie (Erweiterte Sonderausgabe von Kunstforum International: 150 Jahre Fotografie III / Fotografie auf der documenta 6, Band 22); Mainz, Frankfurt am Main (Zweitausendeins) 1977
