= Reichsausstellung Schaffendes Volk =

Reich's Exhibition of a Productive People of 1937

1937
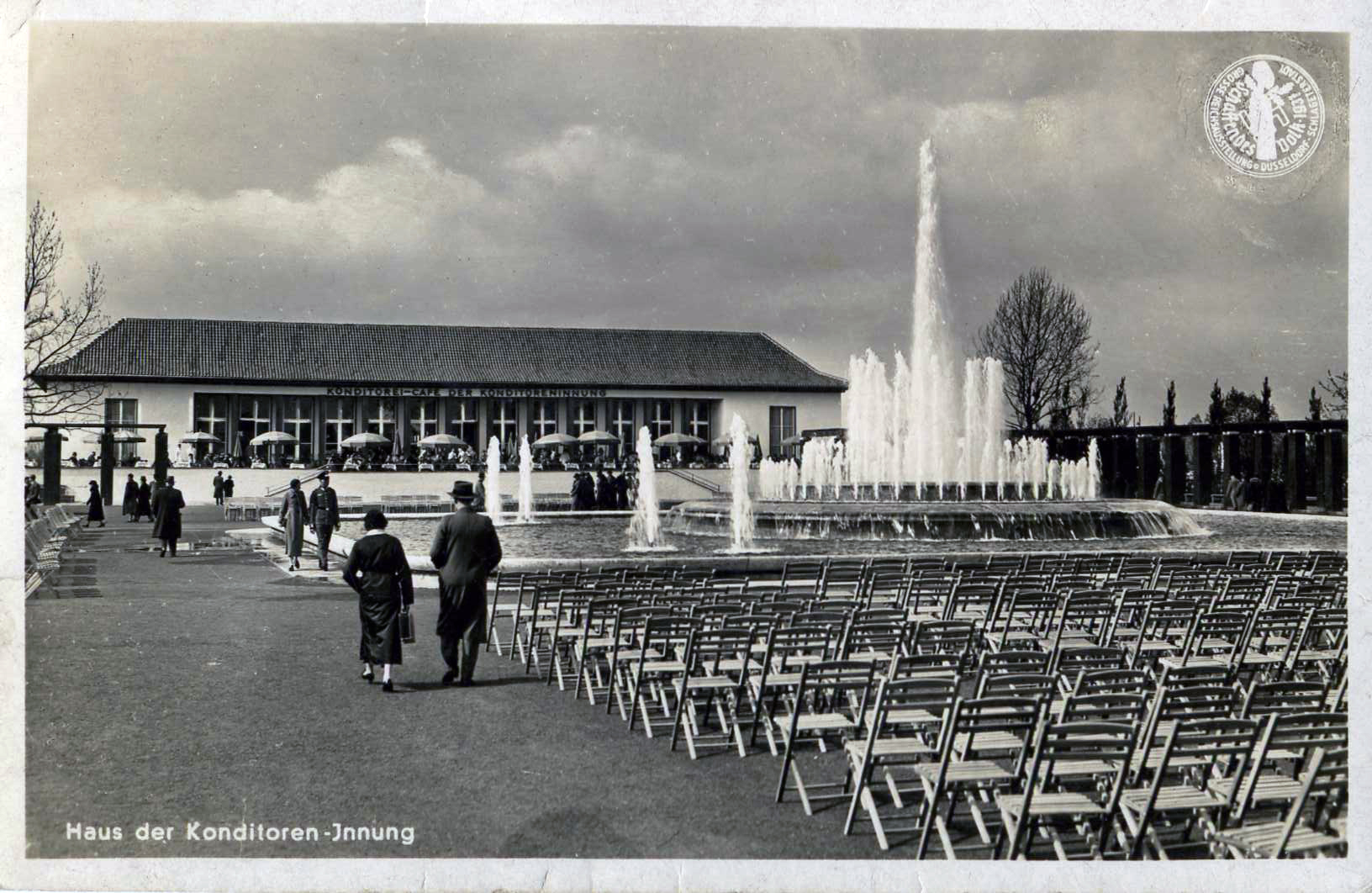
- Postcard showing the confectionary house

Overview
- BIE-class: Unrecognized exposition
- Name: The Reich's Exhibition of a Productive People
- Visitors: 6 million
- Organized by: Ernst Poensgen (director)

Timeline
- Opening: 8 May 1937

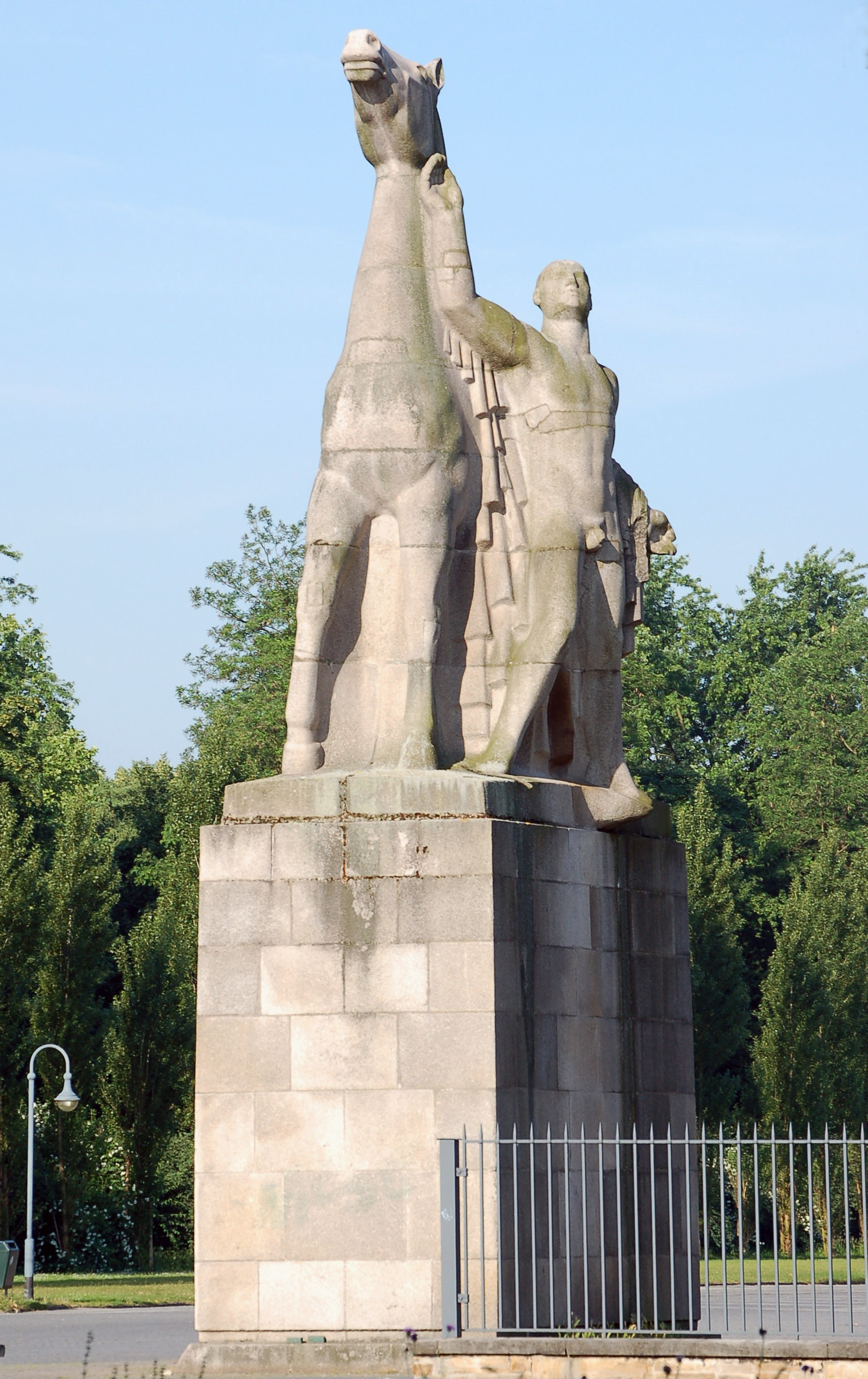
"Rossebändiger" by Edwin Scharff, at the Exhibition's portal

The Reichsausstellung Schaffendes Volk (The Reich's Exhibition of a Productive People) of 1937 was held in today's North Park district of Düsseldorf, Germany, along one mile of the Rhine shoreline. It was opened on May 8, 1937 by Hermann Göring. Through October of the same year it attracted about six million visitors.

== Description ==
Originally planned as an exhibition of the Deutscher Werkbund it finally turned into a rival to the 1937 International Exposition of Modern Life in Paris. The exhibition was meant to showcase the domestic accomplishments of the National Socialists in new housing, art, and science and to prepare the German people for the upcoming four-year plan which aimed at German autarky in (natural) resources. The fair's director was Dr. Ernst Poensgen.

The exhibition was laid out in four main divisions:

- industry and economics
- land utilization and city planning
- material progress (with an emphasis on progress in synthetics/ersatz products)
- arts and culture.

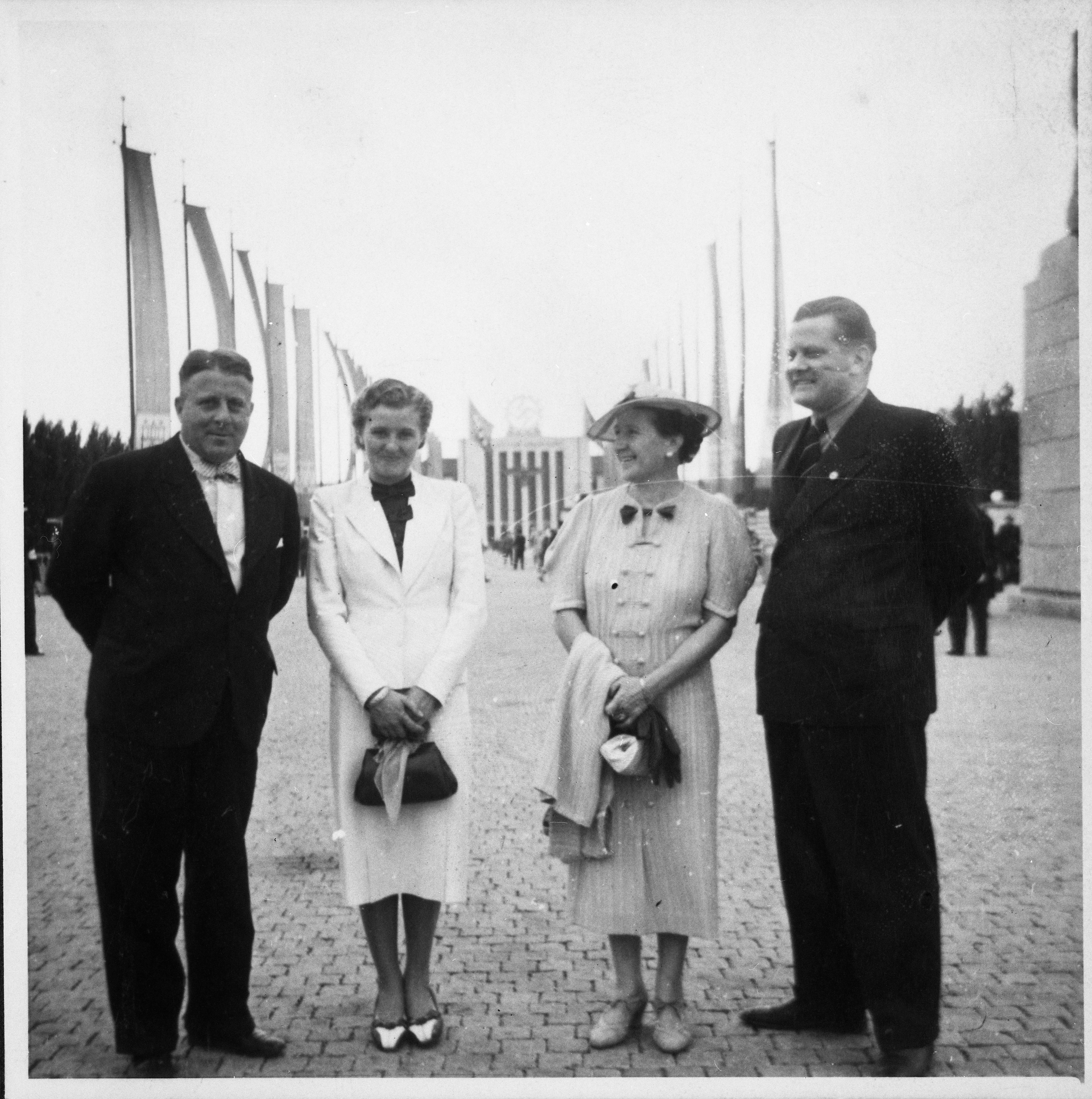
Eva Braun and her mother at the entrance of the Exhibition

Through the publicity efforts of its CEO, Max Keith, a functioning Coca-Cola GmbH bottling plant stood at the center of the fairgrounds, with a miniature train for children, and immediately adjacent to the Propaganda Office.

== Sources ==
- New York Times, April 26, 1937
- Mark Pendergrast (2000). For God, Country and Coca-Cola. Basic Books, pg. 220
- Stefanie Schäfers (2001). Vom Werkbund zum Vierjahresplan. Die Ausstellung 'Schaffendes Volk', Düsseldorf 1937. Droste 2001
- Düsseldorf municipal history site, with photos
