= Bazon Brock =

German art theorist and critic, multi-media generalist and artist

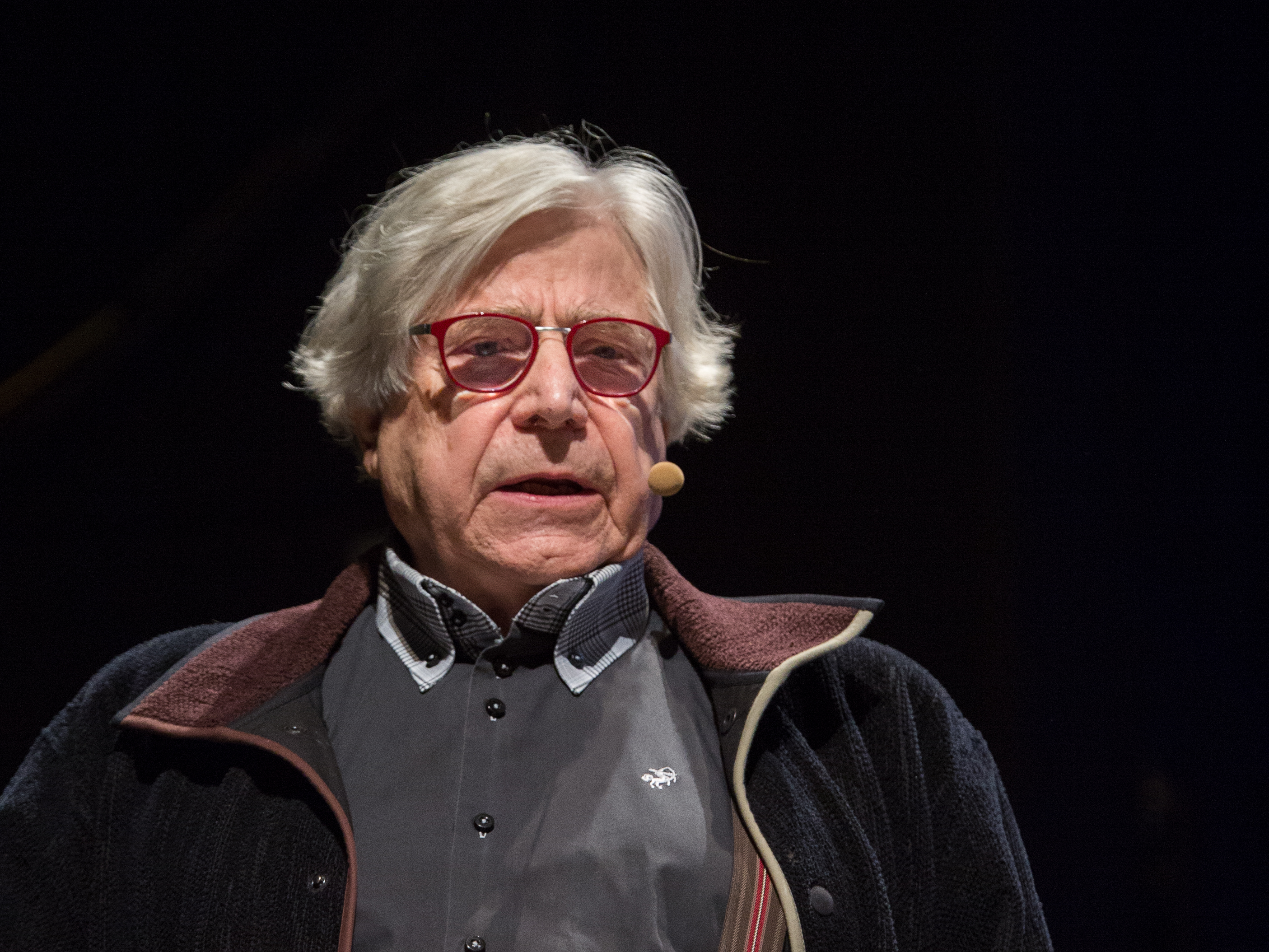
- Brock in 2017
- Born: Jürgen Johannes Hermann Brock; 2 June 1936 (age 90); Stolp, Gau Pomerania, German Reich
- Education: Würzburg University
- Occupations: Art theorist; Art critic; Multi-media generalist; Artist; Academic teacher
- Organizations: Hochschule für bildende Künste Hamburg; University of Applied Arts Vienna; University of Wuppertal
- Awards: Honorary doctorate from the ETH Zurich

Bazon Brock (born Jürgen Johannes Hermann Brock, 2 June 1936) is a German art theorist and critic, multi-media generalist, artist and philosopher. He is considered a member of Fluxus, and was a leading art theorist in the 1960s and 1970s. Interested in making the arts accessible, he ran a "visitors' school" at the documenta from 1968 to 1992. Brock was a professor of aesthetics at the Hochschule für bildende Künste Hamburg, the University of Applied Arts Vienna and the University of Wuppertal.

== Career ==
Brock was born on 2 May 1936 in Stolp, Pomerania, now in Poland. His father, a historian, was executed by the Soviets for collaborating with Hitler. The family fled to Denmark. After two years of internment, they settled in Itzehoe in 1947. Brock attended and graduated from the Kaiser-Karl-Gymnasium, a gymnasium with a focus on the humanities, Latin and Greek. The name Bazon is Greek for chatterer and was applied to him at school by his Latin teacher. From 1957 to 1964, he studied German studies, art history, philosophy and political science at the universities of Zurich, Hamburg and Frankfurt, with Theodor W. Adorno. He achieved a PHD in philosophy but never studied art at a university. During this period, he published poems and "Aktionslehrstücke" (plays), using "Bazon" as his pen name. In 1957, he trained as a dramaturge at the theater of Darmstadt and in 1960, began working at the Lucerne Theatre.

Brock was a professor of "non-normative aesthetics" at the Hochschule für bildende Künste Hamburg from 1965 to 1976. From 1978, he was professor of the "theory of design" at the University of Applied Arts Vienna. In 1981, he was appointed professor of "aesthetics and cultural educations" at the University of Wuppertal, where he became professor emeritus in 2001. In 2010, Brock was a Fellow at the Kolleg Friedrich Nietzsche in Weimar.

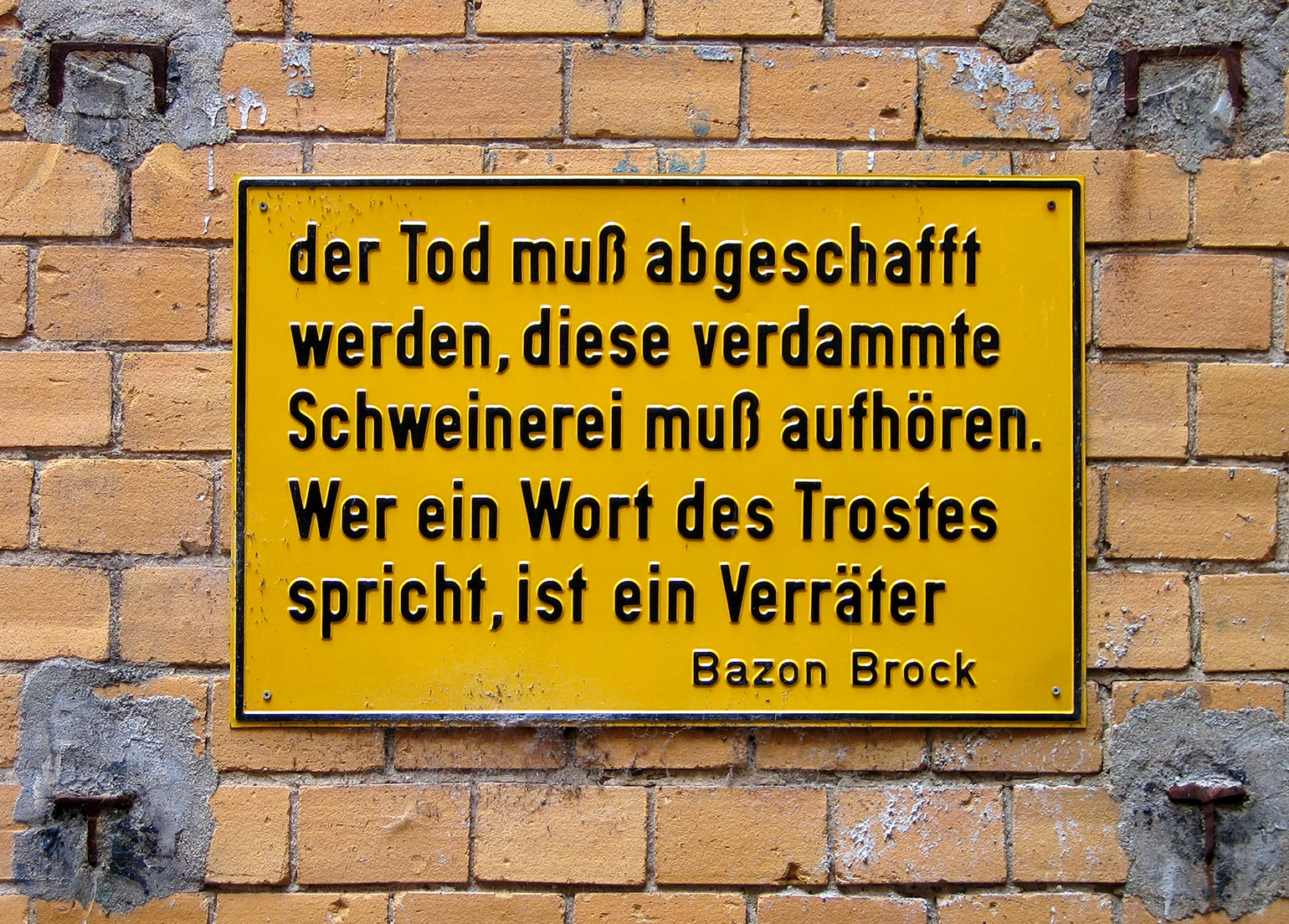
"death must be abolished ..."

In the 1960s, Brock participated in happenings with Friedensreich Hundertwasser, Joseph Beuys and Wolf Vostell. In a 1968 exhibition, he showed a metal plate in the style of a high-voltage warning: "death must be abolished, this damned mess must stop. He who speaks a word of consolation is a traitor" ("der Tod muß abgeschafft werden, diese verdammte Schweinerei muß aufhören. Wer ein Wort des Trostes spricht, ist ein Verräter") and signed Bazon Brock. The text is a truncated version of his eulogy for Siegfried Kracauer, which continued, "betrays the solidarity of all human beings against death... Death... is a scandal, a beastly mess!... Don't let yourselves submit to it, understand death... [is] a monstrous scandal, against which I protest.") ("ist ein Verräter an der Solidarität aller Menschen gegen den Tod... Der Tod ist ein Skandal, eine viehische Schweinerei!... Lasst euch nicht darauf ein, versteht: der Tod... [ist] ein ungeheuerlicher Skandal, gegen den ich protestiere.")

Also in 1968, Brock installed a "Besucherschule" (visitors' school) at documenta IV, introducing exhibition visitors to contemporary art in several hours of "action teaching". The program was repeated several times until 1992. In 2006, he initiated a "Stadientournee des Live-Philosophierens" (stadium tour of live philosophy), entitled "Lustmarsch durchs Theoriegelände" (pleasure march through the terrain of theory). This was done in the style of the late 1980s, when the "Lange Marsch durch die Institutionen" (Long march through the institutions) was started. This installation commemorating his 70th birthday was shown first at the Center for Art and Media Karlsruhe, then at a number of museums, including the Schirn in Frankfurt, Museum Ludwig in Cologne, Von der Heydt Museum in Wuppertal and the Haus der Kunst in Munich. One of the photos shown is titled "Empedocles revised Mortal Philosopher embarrasses Mount Etna by throwing his shoes instead of himself into the crater" (1984). In 2009 he conducted action teaching in the Berlin Gropiusbau at the exhibition "Sixty years. Sixty works", commemorating the 60th anniversary of the creation of the Federal Republic of Germany. In 2011, he introduced the exhibition "Trans-Skulptur" of his friends Anna and Bernhard Blume in Berlin. He created an institution called Denkerei (thinking workshop), for "theoretic art, universal poetry and prognostic", based at the Hoftheater in Kreuzberg. He lectured about the Transcendental Constructivism of Anna and Bernhard Blume at an exhibition at the Kolumba in Cologne on 21 April 1936.

Brock's radio plays were published as tapes in the S-Press Tonband-Verlag, Cologne. A video documentary on his work is titled Ästhetik als Metatheorie – In zwanzig Kapiteln wird ein strukturierter Einstieg in die Denkwelt des KünstlerPhilosophen und GeistTäters gegeben ("Aesthetics as Meta-Theory: Presenting a Structured Introduction into the Sphere of Thought of the Artist Philosopher and Spirit/Mind Actor in Twenty Chapters.").

Bazon Brock received an honorary doctorate in Technical Sciences from the Swiss Federal Institute of Technology Zurich on 21 November 1992.

In an interview close to his 90th birthday he said: "Ich verfolge die apokalyptische optimistische Haltung, wie sie für Europa individuell wie auch kulturell und theologisch vermittelt ist" ("I embrace the apocalyptic optimism that is embodied in Europe—both individually and in cultural and theological terms"); he rejected thought of retirement as nothing an intellectual could imagine.

== Selected works ==
=== In print ===
- Gerüstgrundriß für Übersichtsleser. In: März-Texte 1. Jörg Schröder, Darmstadt 1969 u.ö., again in Mammut. März-Texte 1 & 2. Herbstein 1984, again in reprint März Texte 1 & Trivialmythen. Area, Erftstadt 2004, ISBN 3-89996-029-7, pages 9–14
- Ästhetik als Vermittlung. Arbeitsbiographie eines Generalisten. DuMont Kunstverlag, Köln 1977, ISBN 3-7701-0671-7
- Die Ruine als Form der Vermittlung von Fragment und Totalität. In: Lucien Dällenbach und Christiaan L. Hart Nibbrig (editors): Fragment und Totalität. Suhrkamp, Frankfurt/Main 1984, ISBN 3-518-11107-8
- Ästhetik gegen erzwungene Unmittelbarkeit. Die Gottsucherbande. Schriften 1978–1986. DuMont Buchverlag, Köln 1986, ISBN 3-7701-1976-2
- Der Barbar als Kulturheld. Dumont Literatur und Kunst Verlag, Köln 2002, ISBN 3-8321-7149-5
- Die Macht des Alters. exhibition catalogue, DuMont, Köln 1998
- Die Re-Dekade: Kunst und Kultur der 80er Jahre. Klinkhardt und Biermann, München 1990, ISBN 3-7814-0288-6
- Die Welt zu Deinen Füßen. DuMont, Köln 1998
- Lock Buch Bazon Brock. ‚Gebt Ihr ein Stück, so gebt es gleich in Stücken'. DuMont Kunstverlag, Köln 2000, ISBN 3-7701-5436-3
- Bazon Brock (editor): Lustmarsch durchs Theoriegelände. Verlag Dumont Literatur und Kunst, Köln 2007, ISBN 978-3-8321-9024-8
- Bazon Brock: Der Profi-Bürger. Handreichungen für die Ausbildung von Diplom-Bürgern, Diplom-Patienten, Diplom-Konsumenten, Diplom-Rezipienten und Diplom-Gläubigen. Wilhelm Fink Verlag, Paderborn 2011, ISBN 978-3-7705-5160-6
- Wollt Ihr das totale Leben? Fluxus und Agit-Pop der 60er Jahre in Aachen. Neuer Aachener Kunstverein, Aachen, 1995, ISBN 3-929261-24-3.
- Nie wieder störungsfrei! Aachen Avantgarde seit 1964, Kerber Verlag, 2011, ISBN 978-3-86678-602-8.
- Beuys Brock Vostell. Aktion Demonstration Partizipation 1949-1983. ZKM - Zentrum für Kunst und Medientechnologie, Hatje Cantz, Karlsruhe, 2014, ISBN 978-3-7757-3864-4.

=== Video documentations ===
- Wir wollen Gott und damit basta. DuMont, Köln 1985
- Selbsterregung – eine rhetorische Oper zur Erzwingung der Gefühle (produced by the WDR, aired on 17 April 1992), Schiebener und Jürgens, Köln 1990
- Quer Denken – Gerade Gehen 45 Min. / D, PL. A portrait film by Ingo Hamacher Bellacoola about Bazon Brock was produced in the series "Querköpfe" for the WDR, aired in April 1991
- Der Körper des Kunstbetrachters, video catalogue for the documenta IX in June 1992, shown several times on TV
- Ästhetik als Metatheorie – In zwanzig Kapiteln wird ein strukturierter Einstieg in die Denkwelt des KünstlerPhilosophen und GeistTäters gegeben ("Aesthetics as meta-theory: Presents a structured introduction into the sphere of thought of the artist philosopher and spirit/mind delinquent in twenty chapters.")
- Vlog (((rebell.tv))), a documentary "Dossier Bazon Brock" of a tour in 2006
- Bazon Brock. Mann mit Mission. Universalpoet und Prognostiker. filmbox of 16 DVDs. Verlag und Datenbank für Geisteswissenschaften VDG, Weimar 2010, ISBN 978-3-89739-688-3

=== TV productions ===
- Bazon Brock zur Geschichte der Kybernetik, 6 hours in 3sat, 1997, at the "Installation eines Theoriegeländes" in Portikus, Frankfurt, February 1997.
- Bazon Brock was from 1997 to 2008 moderator of the TV discussion "Bilderstreit" in 3sat.

=== Radio plays ===
- Jeremia Casting – ein Hört, Hört. DeutschlandRadio Kultur, hr2-kultur, Center for Art and Media Karlsruhe. Directed by Bazon Brock, Christian Bauer, Holger Stenschke, aired first in hr2-kultur on 27 April 2011
