= Franz Josef Degenhardt =

German poet, satirist, novelist and songwriter

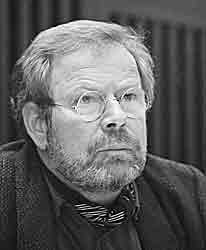
- Franz Josef Degenhardt in 1987
- Born: 3 December 1931; Schwelm, Westphalia, Germany
- Died: 14 November 2011 (aged 79); Quickborn, Schleswig-Holstein, Germany
- Occupations: Singer-songwriter; Guitarist; Poet; Satirist; Novelist; Lawyer
- Known for: Spiel nicht mit den Schmuddelkindern
- Website: www.franz-josef-degenhardt.de

Franz Josef Degenhardt (3 December 1931 – 14 November 2011) was a German poet, satirist, novelist, and – first and foremost – a folksinger/songwriter (Liedermacher) with decidedly left-wing politics. He was also a lawyer, bearing the academic degree of Doctor of Law.

Degenhardt was born in Schwelm, Westphalia. After studying law from 1952 to 1956 in Cologne and Freiburg, he passed the first German state bar examination in 1956 and the second in 1960. In 1961, he worked for the Europa-Institut of the University at Saarbrücken, where he obtained his doctorate in 1966. Degenhardt joined the Social Democratic Party of Germany (SPD) in 1961, but was forced out in 1971 because of his support for the German Communist Party (DKP), which he joined in 1978.

From the early 1960s onward, in addition to practicing law, Degenhardt was also performing music and releasing recordings. His most successful work was the song (and album of the same name) "Spiel nicht mit den Schmuddelkindern" ("Don't Play With the Grubby Children," 1965). He released close to 50 albums, starting with Zwischen Null Uhr und Mitternacht ("Between 00:00 and Midnight," 1963), renamed Rumpelstilzchen (original title: Zwischen Null Uhr Null und Mitternacht). His final album, Dreizehnbogen ("Thirteen Sheets"), was released in 2008.

In 1968, Degenhardt was involved in trials of members of the German student movement, principally defending social democrats and communists. At the same time, he was – in his capacity as a singer-songwriter – one of the major voices of the 1968 student movement. In 1972 he translated the song "Here's to You" under the title Sacco und Vanzetti with five new verses. On his 1977 album Wildledermantelmann he criticized many of his former comrades from that era for what he saw as their betrayal of socialist ideals and shift towards a social-liberal orientation. The album's title (roughly, "man with velour coat") mocks the style of clothing they had supposedly adopted.

The songs on Degenhardt's 1986 album Junge Paare auf Bänken ("Young Couples on the Benches"), along with the song Vorsicht Gorilla! ("Beware of Gorilla") on the 1985 album of the same name, are his translations into German of chansons by the French singer-songwriter Georges Brassens, spiritually perhaps one of his closest musical allies.

Degenhardt has also written several novels, most in a rather autobiographical vein, among others: Zündschnüre ("Slow Matches", 1972), Brandstellen ("Scenes of Fires", 1974), Der Liedermacher (1982) and Für ewig und drei Tage ("For Ever and Three Days", 1999). Zündschnüre was turned into a TV-movie in 1974 by Reinhard Hauff.

He was a cousin of the Catholic Archbishop of Paderborn, Johannes Joachim Degenhardt, who died in 2002. He was also the brother-in-law of the American-born illustrator Gertrude Degenhardt, who has designed many of his album covers for him. Degenhardt lived, until his death in 2011, in Quickborn, Kreis Pinneberg, in Schleswig-Holstein.
