= Stadtmuseum Oldenburg =

Museum in Germany

Coordinates: 53°08′40″N 8°12′53″E

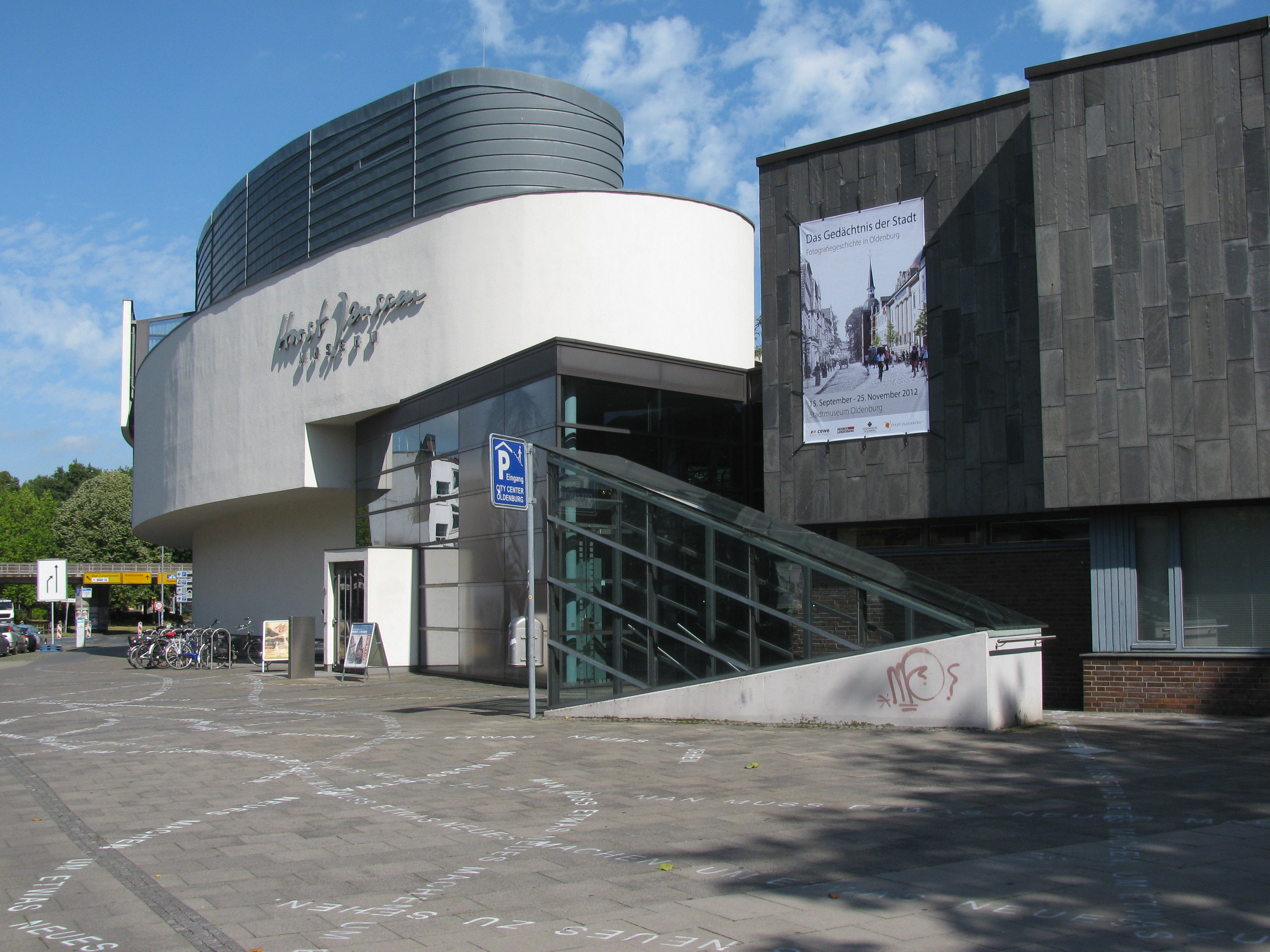
Shared entrance with the Horst-Janssen-Museum. The Stadtmuseum Oldenburg is on the right.

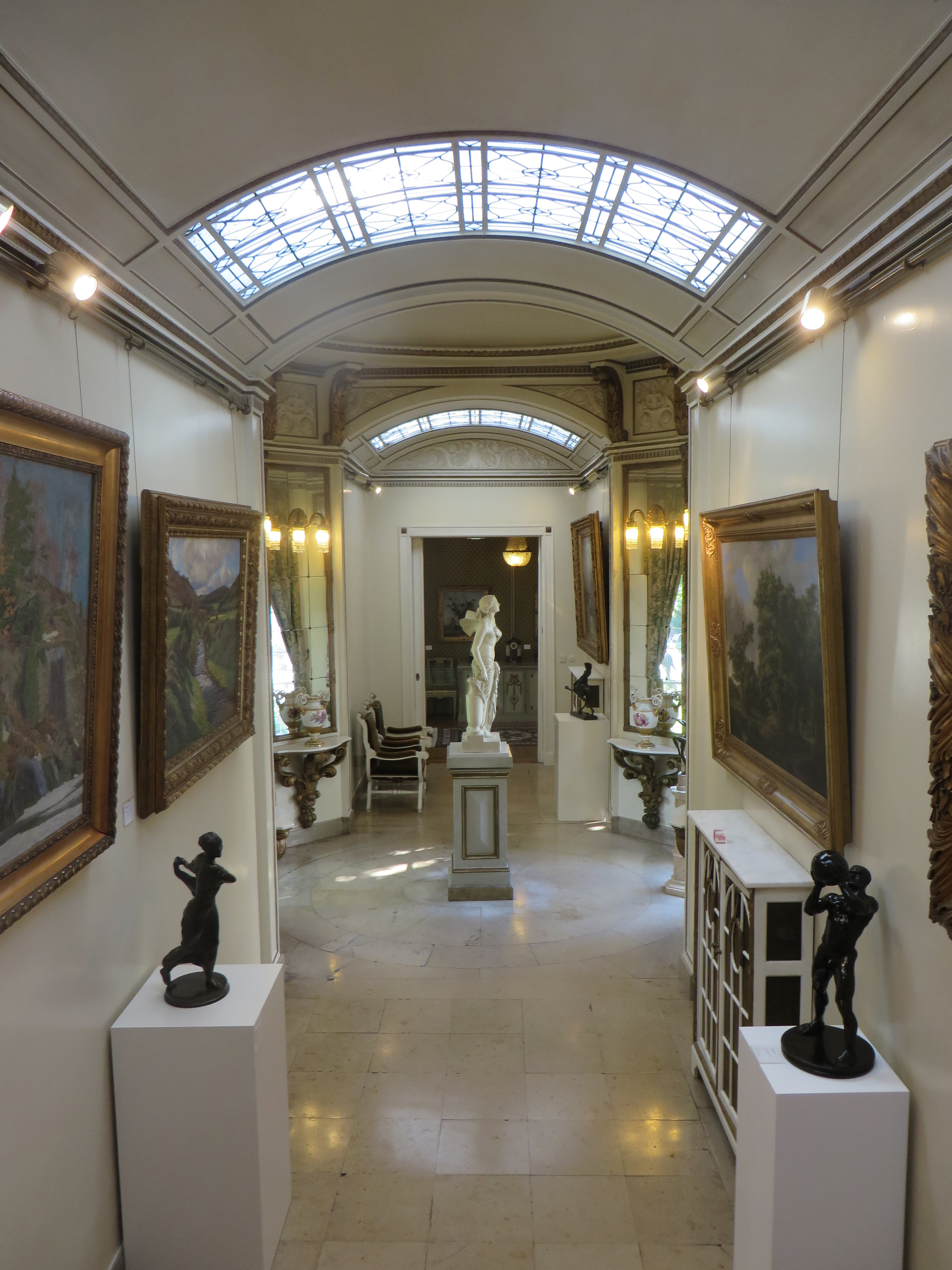
Internal view in one of the historic houses that form part of the Stadtmuseum Oldenburg.

The Stadtmuseum Oldenburg is a municipal museum covering the history of the city of Oldenburg, Lower Saxony, Germany.

== Overview ==
The museum consists of three historic houses with recreated interiors as well as the main building. The New Gallery (former main building) was demolished in the beginning of 2022 in order to make space for the new building due to open in late 2024. The new building will provide more space for permanent exhibitions (on the history and identity of the city of Oldenburg) as well as temporary exhibitions (on various different topics and including art installations). The so-called Hüppe Saal, a structure that was built to connect the main building with the historic houses and used for exhibitions and events, donated by the Claus-Hüppe-Stiftung, however still stands and will continue to join both building ensembles in the future. Since the museum is currently undergoing construction and restoration processes, it is temporarily closed but still hosts various exhibitions and projects in different locations within the city centre.

The Stadtmuseum Oldenburg shares its entrance with the co-located Horst-Janssen-Museum, an art museum dedicated to the artist Horst Janssen that opened in 2000. The entrance area includes a shop and cafe.

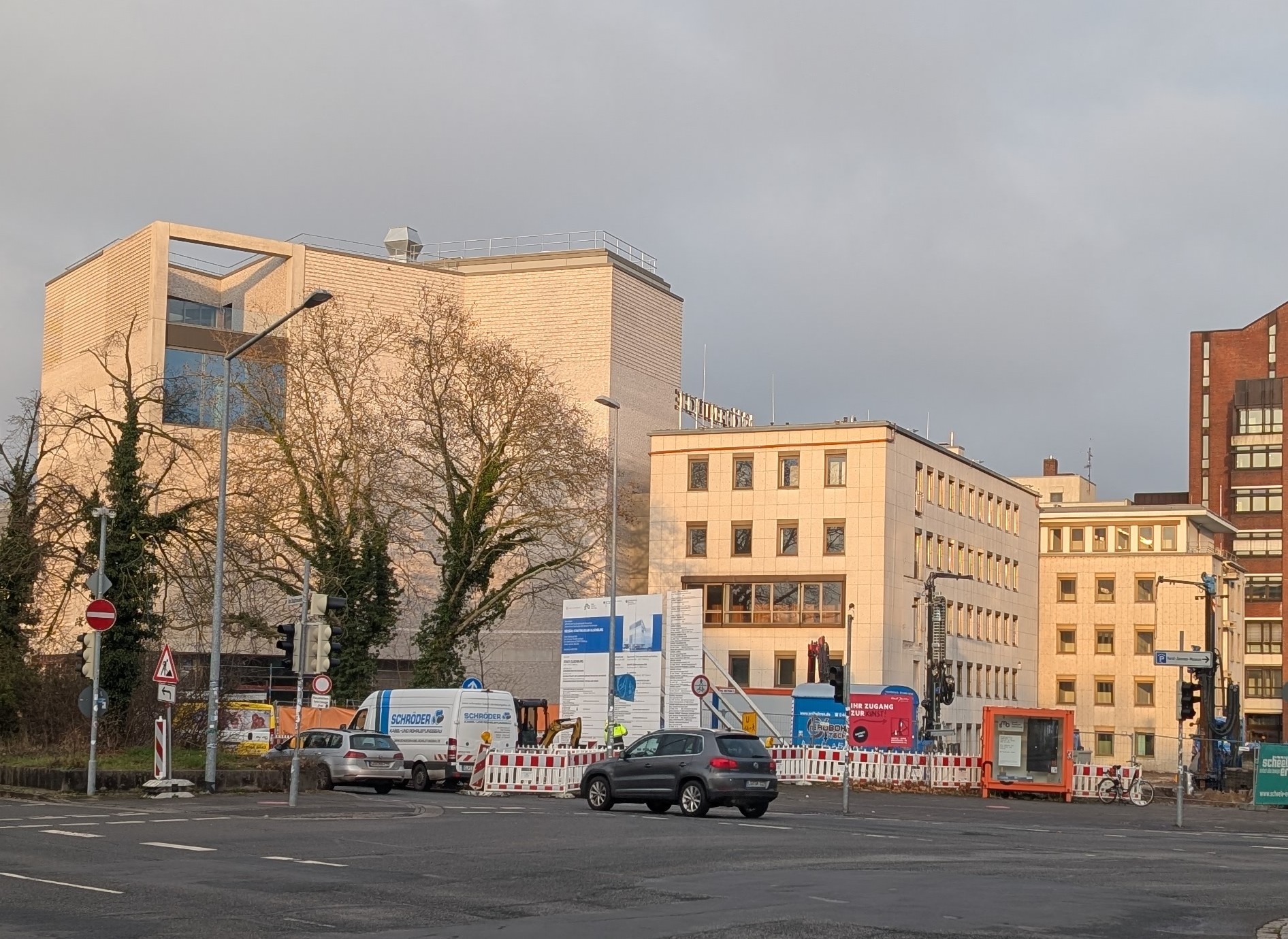
Stadtmuseum Oldenburg, New Building, December 2025

== History ==
The museum was set up and, according to his testament, posthumously donated to his hometown by collector and Oldenburg native Theodor Francksen (1875 - 1914) in 1915. During his relatively short life the bachelor and heir of a substantial inheritance created a private museum within the so-called Francksen Villa, his parental home, and acquired the neighboring house (Jürgens'sche Villa) when he needed additional space for his growing collection. Both of these historic houses including all collector's items were gifted to the city with the premise of being run as a museum in the future. The neighboring, third historic house (Ballin'sche Villa) was added to the ensemble by the city of Oldenburg much later.

== Gallery ==
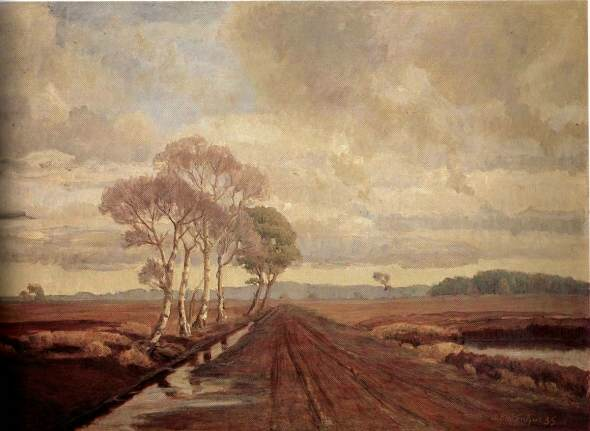
Painting by Gerhard Bakenhus (1935) in the Stadtmuseum Oldenburg.

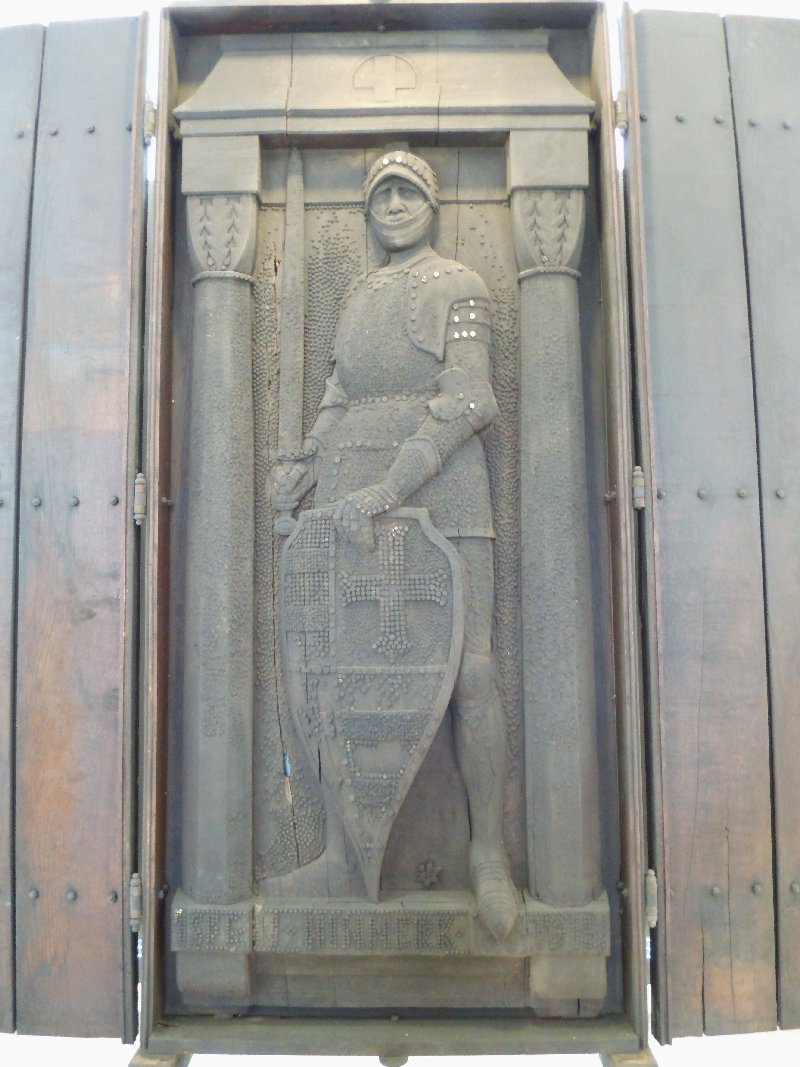
Relief work in the Stadtmuseum Oldenburg.

== See also ==
- List of visitor attractions in Oldenburg
