= Horst-Janssen-Museum =

Museum in Germany

Coordinates: 53°08′40″N 8°12′53″E

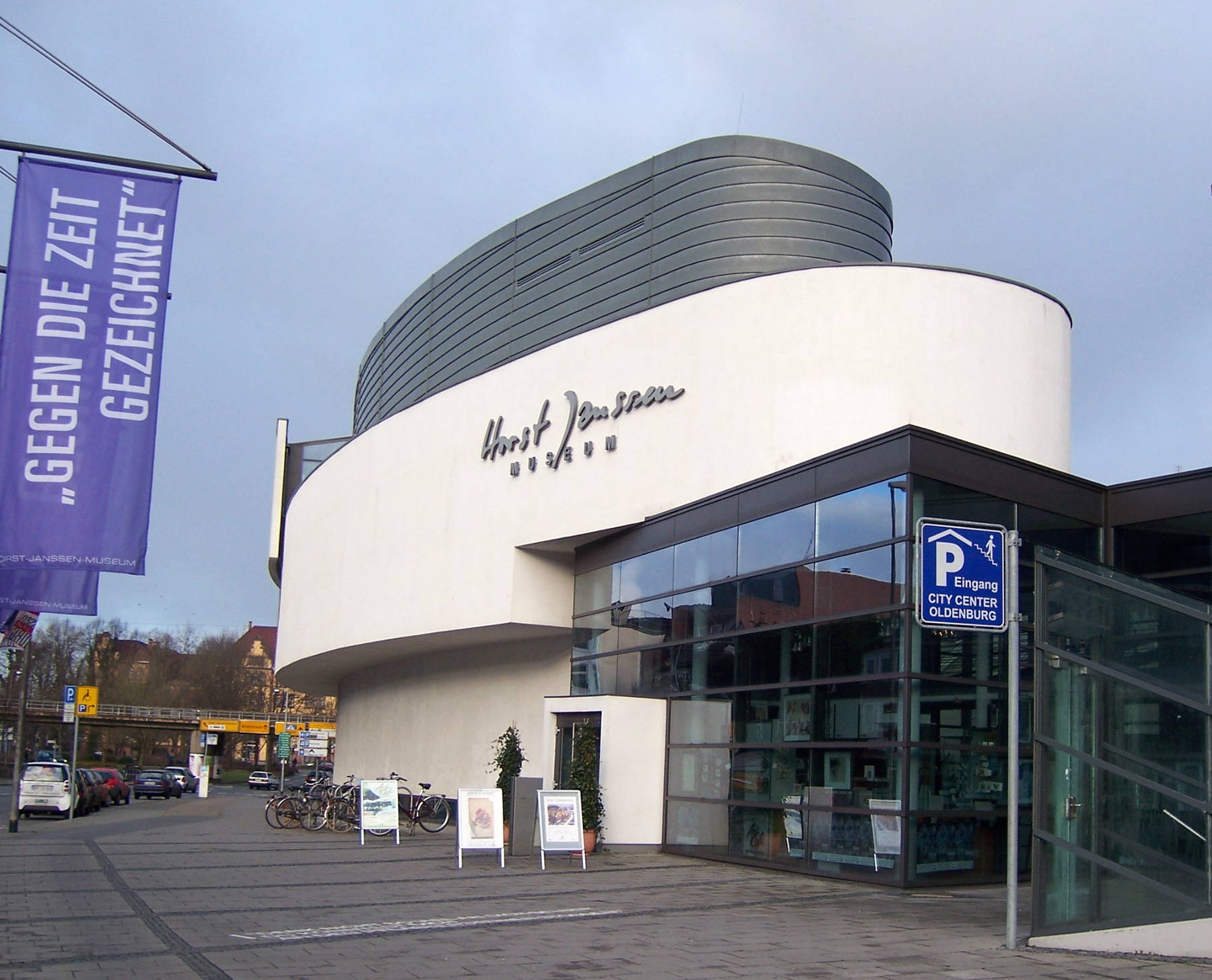
The Horst-Janssen-Museum building in Oldenburg.

Horst-Janssen-Museum is an art museum located in Oldenburg, Lower Saxony, Germany. It is dedicated to the work of Horst Janssen, the draftsman, etcher, lithographer, wood engraver, poster artist and illustrator.

The Horst-Janssen-Museum was opened in 2000, showing 1,800 pieces from the collection of the couple Carin and Carl Vogel. In 1995, the Oldenburg entrepreneur Hüppe acquired the Janssen collection for 1.5 million DM. The various facets of Janssen's art are shown in a permanent exhibition. Changing exhibitions show works of artists that influenced Janssen, such as Goya, Rembrandt, and Egon Schiele. Additional drawings and prints from the collection can be viewed on request. A library contains 25,000 volumes, including publications of Janssen.

The Claus Hüppe Foundation awards at regular intervals the Horst Janssen Print Prize. It has been awarded to Katja Eckert (2003), Daniel Roth (2005) and Anna Lea Hucht (2008).

The museum shares its entrance with the co-located Stadtmuseum Oldenburg, which covers the history of Oldenburg.
