= Hein & Oss =

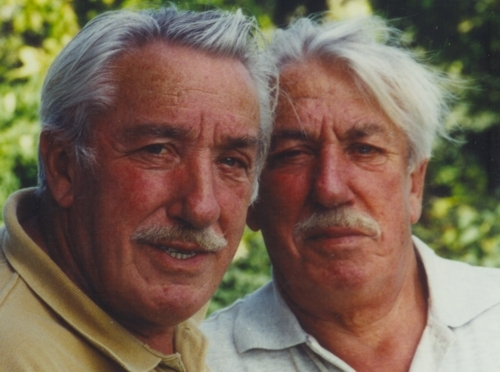
Hein & Oss in 2000

Hein & Oss was a German duo consisting of twins Heinrich "Hein" Kröher (September 17, 1927 – February 14, 2016) and Oskar "Oss" Kröher (September 17, 1927 – July 1, 2019) were folk singer-songwriters. They were born in Pirmasens, Rhineland-Palatinate. The twins had an extensive career, both performering for five decades of stages both in the European continent and North America.

Hein died on February 14, 2016, aged 88. Oss died on July 1, 2019, in Rodalben, Rhineland-Palatinate at the age of 91.
