= Spiel nicht mit den Schmuddelkindern =

Studio album by Franz Josef Degenhardt
- Released: 1965
- Genre: Protest song
- Length: 49:45
- Label: Polydor
- Producer: Jimmy Bowien

Franz Josef Degenhardt chronology
Rumpelstilzchen (1963)	Spiel nicht mit den Schmuddelkindern (1965)	Väterchen Franz (1966)

Spiel nicht mit den Schmuddelkindern (Do not play with the grubby kids) is a 1965 album by liedermacher (singer-songwriter) Franz Josef Degenhardt, named after the track of the same name. It was his second album, after Rumpelstilzchen. The songs also appeared as a 1969 book. The title of the album and the song became a catchphrase, and the title song is regarded as Degenhardt's most successful work.

== Themes ==
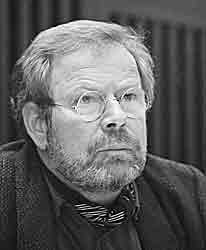
Franz Josef Degenhardt, author, singer and guitarist, in 1987

The album is a collection of songs criticising the bourgeois society in Germany after World War II with sarcasm and surrealism. It anticipated the 1968 student movement in West Germany. The singer "with the piercing voice and the powerfully plucked guitar" criticised nuclear war, class-based society and the war in Vietnam. The title song became one of Degenhardt's best-known, in the style of a moritat. It tells the story of an upper-class boy who likes to play with workers' children, but is forced into an upper-class career to fulfil his parents' expectations.

== Track listing ==
1. Spiel nicht mit den Schmuddelkindern
2. Ein schönes Lied
3. Deutscher Sonntag
4. Auf der Espresso-Maschine
5. Hochzeit
6. Gelobtes Land
7. Alte Freunde
8. Wölfe mitten im Mai
9. Der schwarze Mann
10. Der Mann von nebenan
11. Zwei und zwei
12. Diesmal werd’ ich nicht
13. Der, der meine Lieder singt

== Reception ==
The first line of "Spiel nicht mit den Schmuddelkindern" became a frequently quoted phrase. The song was included in the popular song collection Die Mundorgel in 1982.

In 2010, the album was ranked No. 42 among the 50 best German albums by a jury of the German edition of the Rolling Stone magazine, reasoning:

Ein Sittengemälde der Bundesrepublik Wirtschaftswunderdeutschland, Mitte der 60er-Jahre, dessen Titel längst ein geflügeltes Wort geworden ist. Der Bänkelsänger mit der schneidenden Stimme und der kräftig gezupften Gitarre rückt drei Jahre vor der Studentenbewegung die Spießigkeit und den nur teilweise versteckten Nazismen mit Spott, Witz und surrealer Poesie zu Leibe. […] Ein historisches Dokument und zugleich ein Werk, das heute immer noch Geltung besitzt. Auf dieser Platte sind 13 Lieder, die auch heute noch an den Halsspeck gehen.

(A moral portrait of the Federal Republic of Wirtschaftswunder Germany, in the mid-60s, whose title has long since become a catchphrase. Three years before the student movement, the ballad singer with the piercing voice and the powerfully plucked guitar tackles the bourgeoisie and only partially hidden Nazisms with mockery, wit and surreal poetry. [...] A historical document and at the same time a work that is still valid today. There are 13 songs on this record that still get to your neck fat today.)

Reviewer Daniel Koch described the album as a moral portrait of the Federal Republic in the mid-60s, when the economy was successful (Wirtschaftswunder) but problems such as nuclear war, class differences and Vietnam were looming. Three years before the 1968 student movement in West Germany, Degenhardt tackled the upper class and its "only partially hidden Nazism", using wit and surreal poetry, with "the right images". The reviewer called the album both a historical document and a work that is still valid today. Degenhardt influenced generations of liedermacher, from Hannes Wader to Gisbert zu Knyphausen. The title song is regarded as Degenhardt's most successful work, an expression of opposition to the "bourgeois complacency and bigotry" ("bürgerliche Selbstgefälligkeit und Borniertheit") of the 1960s.
