= Svanshall =

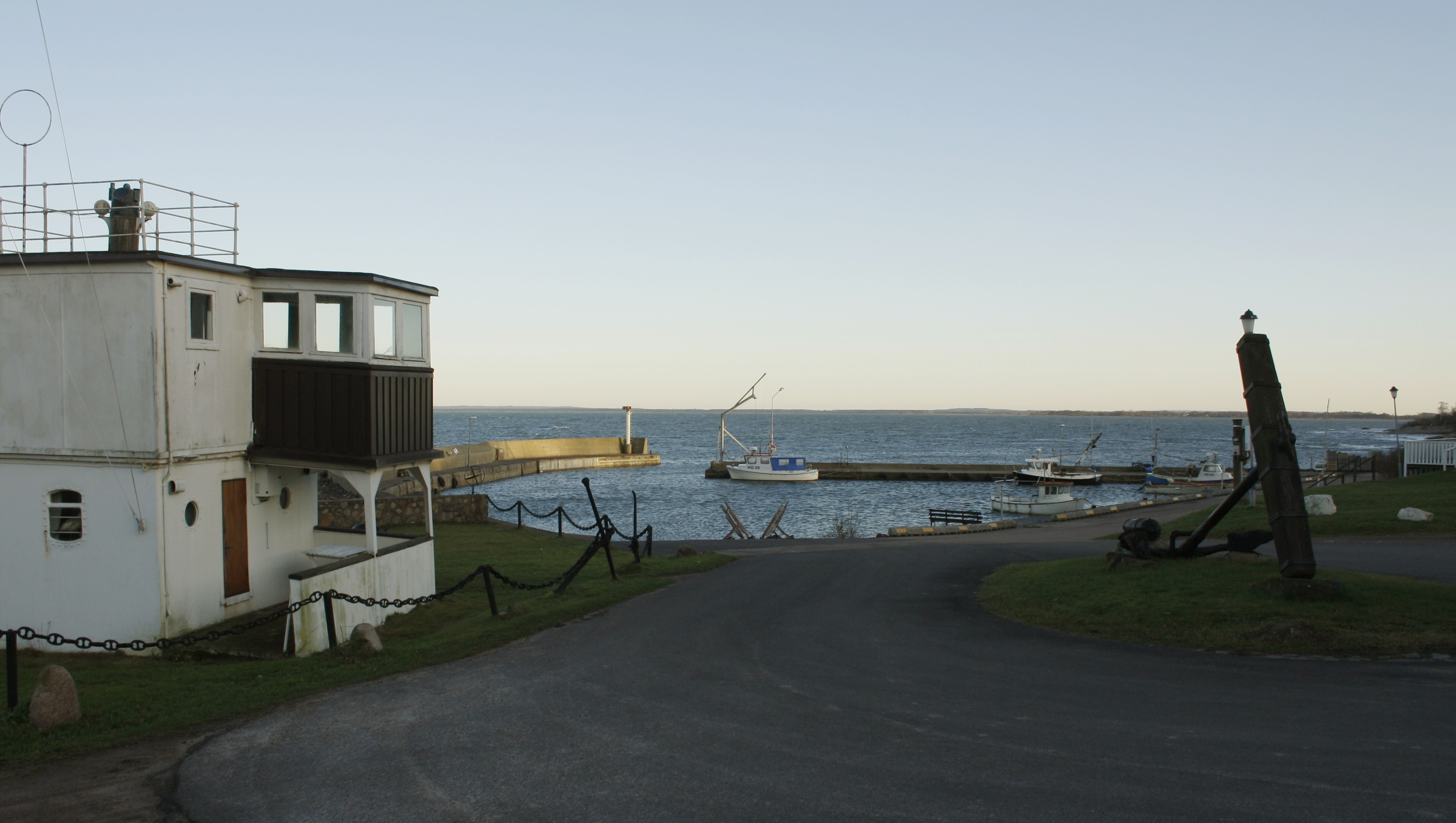
- Svanshall, 6 January 2012

- Location within Skåne Location within Sweden
- Coordinates: 56°15′10″N 12°39′19″E
- Country: Sweden
- Province: Skåne
- County: Skåne County
- Municipality: Höganäs Municipality
- Time zone: UTC+1 (CET)
  - Summer (DST): UTC+2 (CEST)

Svanshall is a small fishing village on the western coast of northwest Skåne County, southwest Sweden, about 25 km north of Helsingborg. The nearest village to the south is Jonstorp; north along the coast are the villages of Skäret and Arild. The village has a small marina and lighthouse. On July 15, 1749, it was passed by Carl Linnaeus on his Scanian trip. It is a surfing location.
