= Alfred Mahlau =

German painter, illustrator and teacher

Alfred Mahlau (21 June 1894 in Berlin – 22 January 1967), German painter, illustrator and teacher. He was best known for his graphical work and illustrations, and for the large stained glass window, Dance of Death, in the Lübeck Marienkirche (St. Mary's Church in Lübeck), which paid homage to a famous mural of the Dance of Death in the church that was destroyed in the bombing of Lübeck during World War II. His books include a number of works with paintings and drawings of Hamburg and the Hamburg port. The product design for Niederegger from the twenties is still in use.

Among his students were Horst Janssen, Vicco von Bülow, and Chinese-German artist Dr Chow Chung-cheng. His work is collected by the Busch-Reisinger Museum, among others.
