= Carolina Falkholt =

Swedish painter (born 1977)

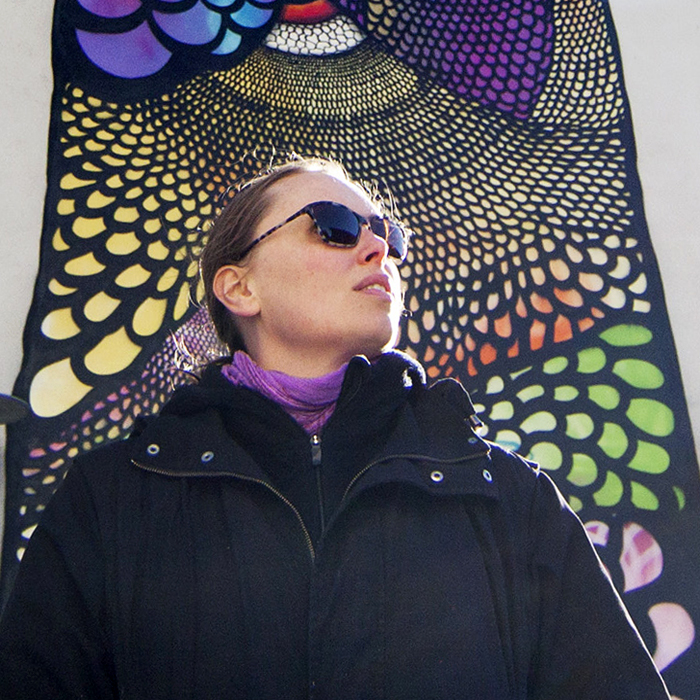
- Portrait of the artist, 2013
- Born: Carolina Alexandra Falkholt; 1977 (age 48–49); Gothenburg, Sweden
- Education: Kristofferskolan
- Notable work: Fuck the World
- Movement: Graffiti
- Website: Carolina Falkholt on Instagram

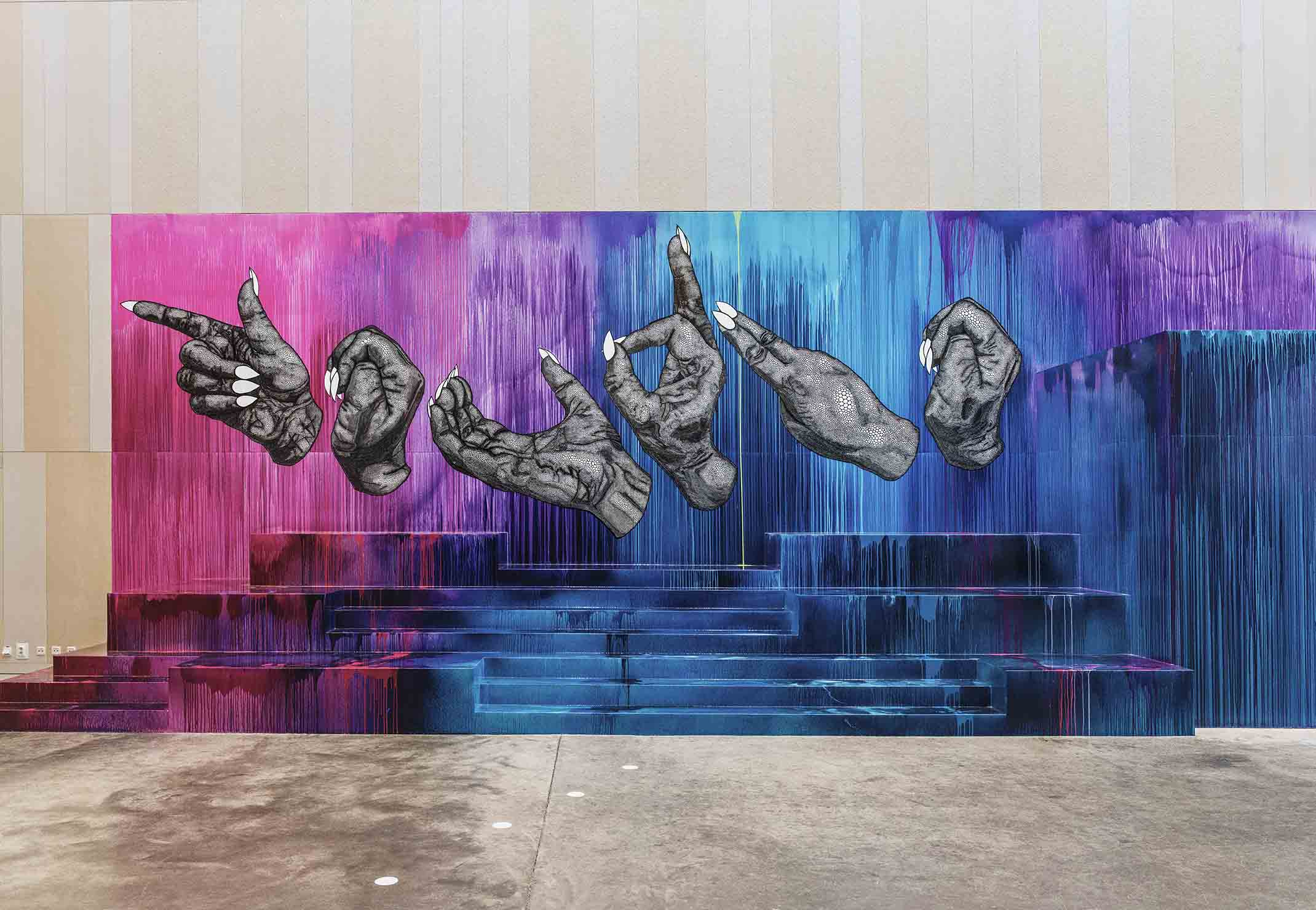
Techne, Installation. Indoors in culture centre Mimers Hus in Kungälv, Sweden, 2016

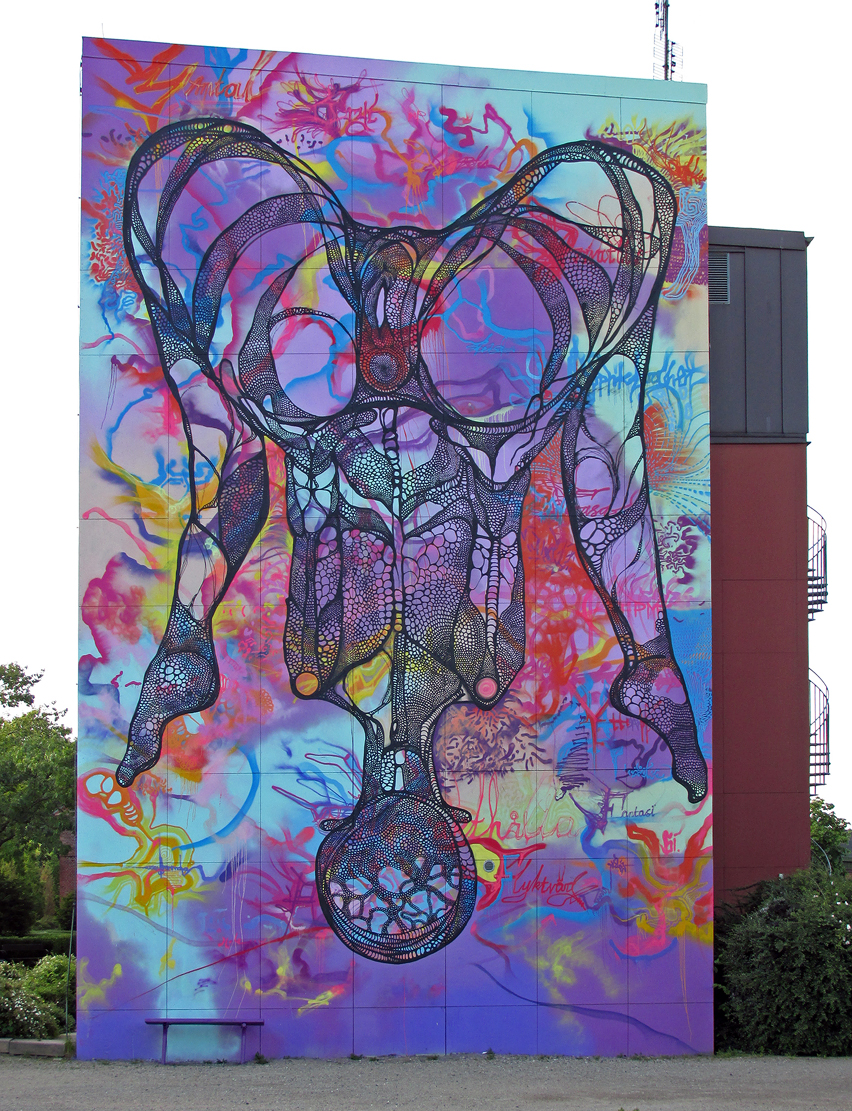
Untitled (Firewall), Parkskolan in Ystad, Sweden, 2015.

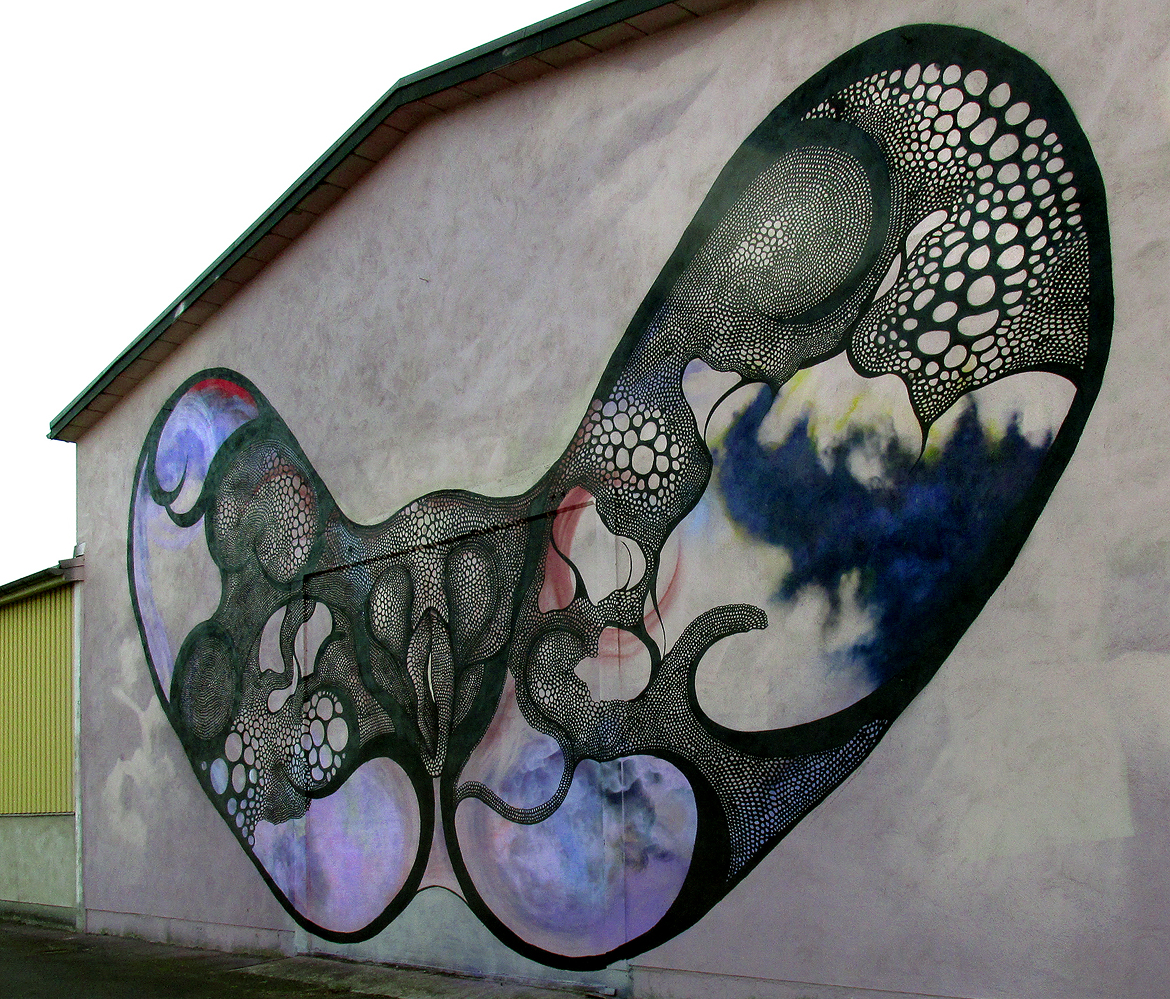
Mural, Södra Dragongatan, Ystad, 2015

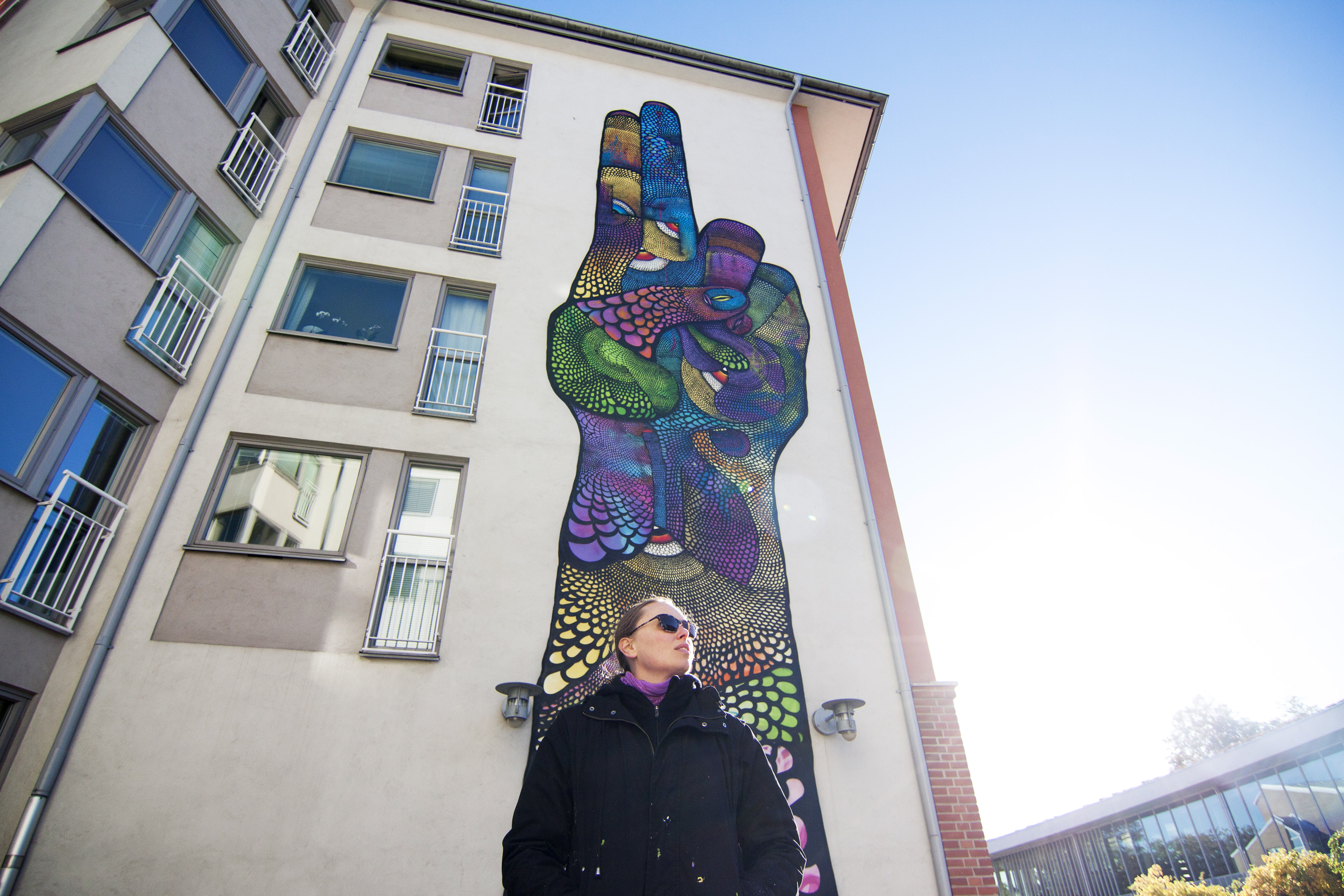
Carolina Falkholt in front of Pi, on the student house Jakten, Halmstad

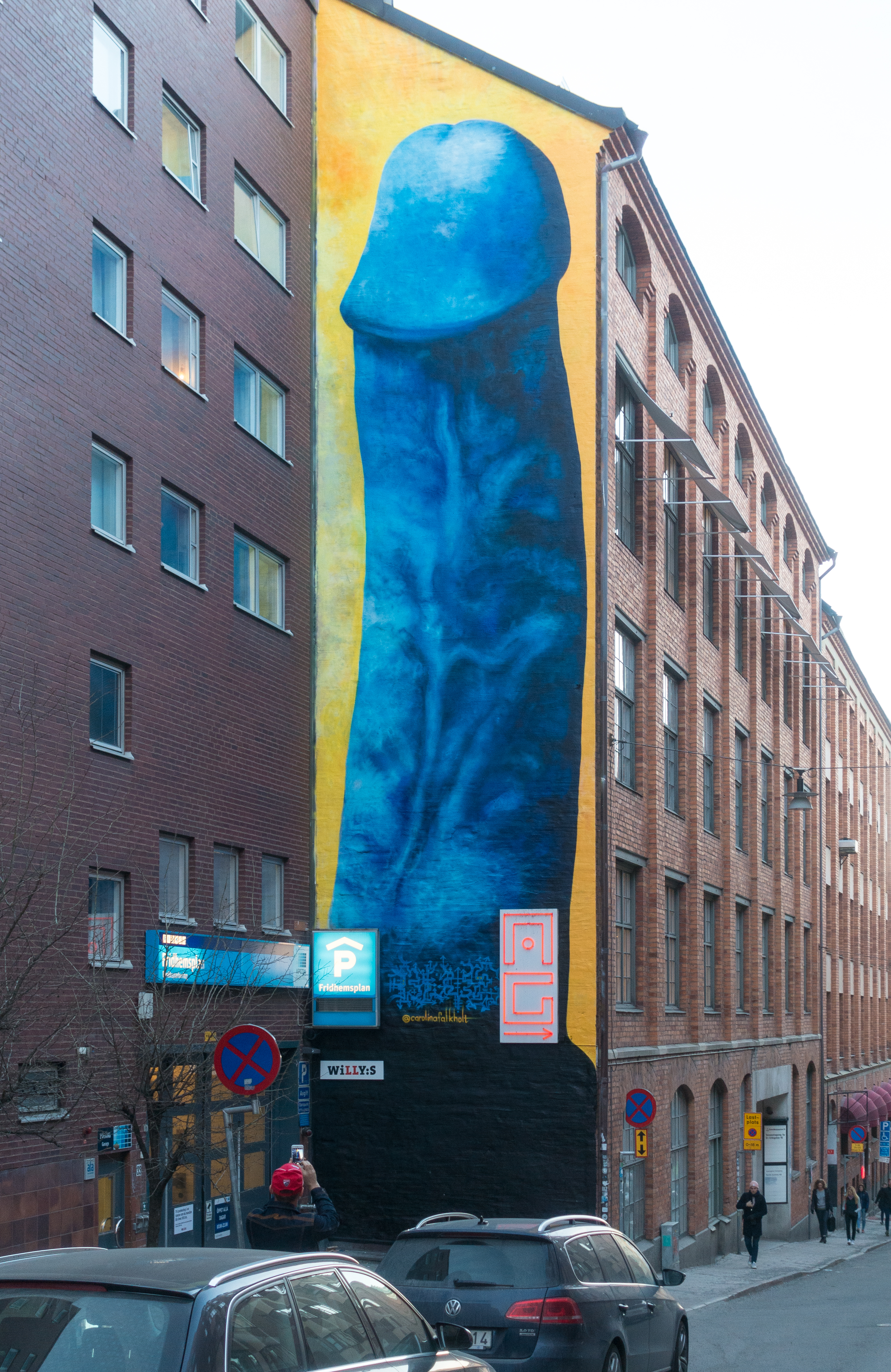
Falkholt's Fuck the World painting in Kungsholmen, Stockholm, 2018

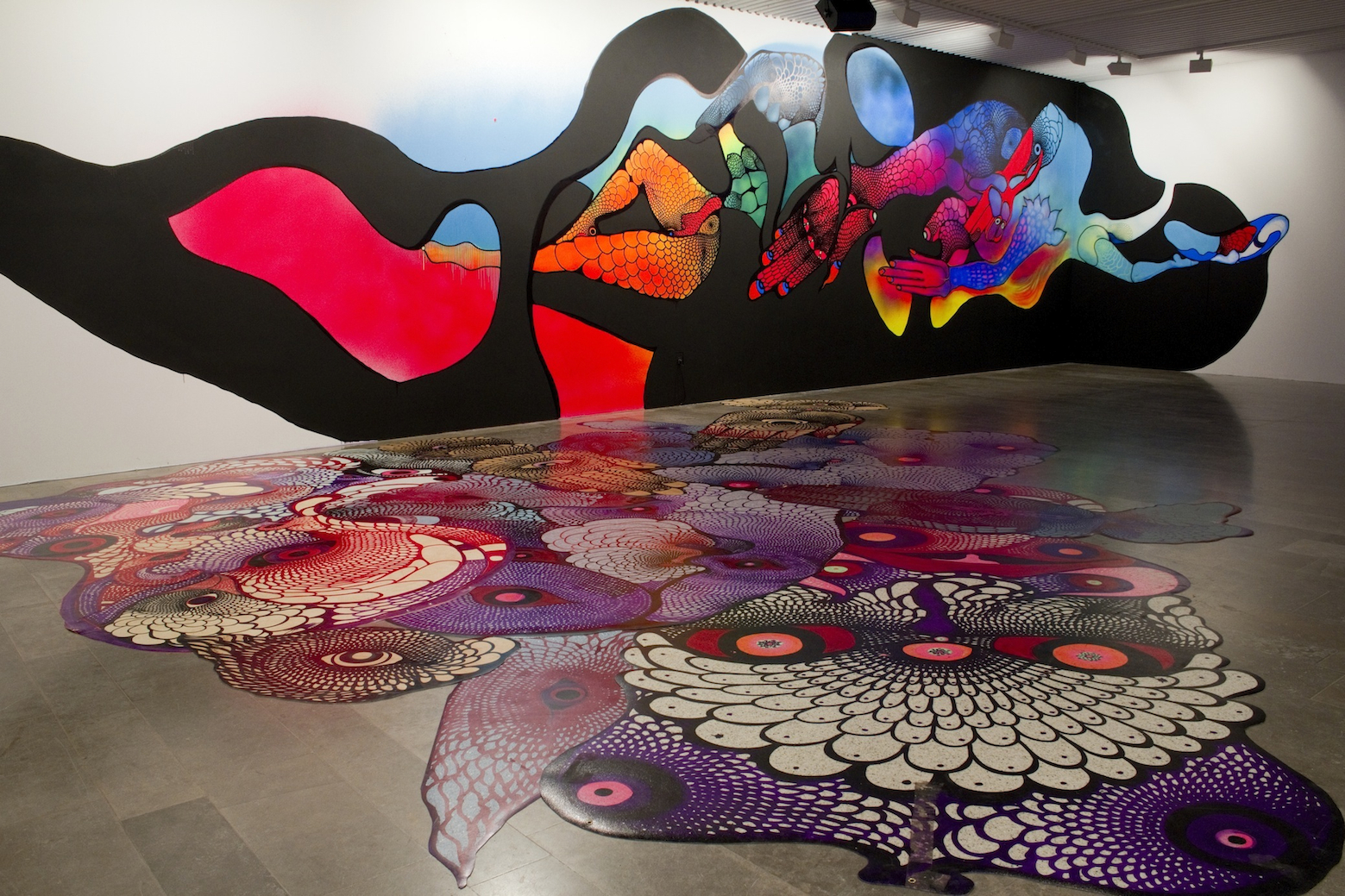
Documentation of the exhibition Materialutmattning (Material fatigue) in Gothenburg Museum of Art, 2011

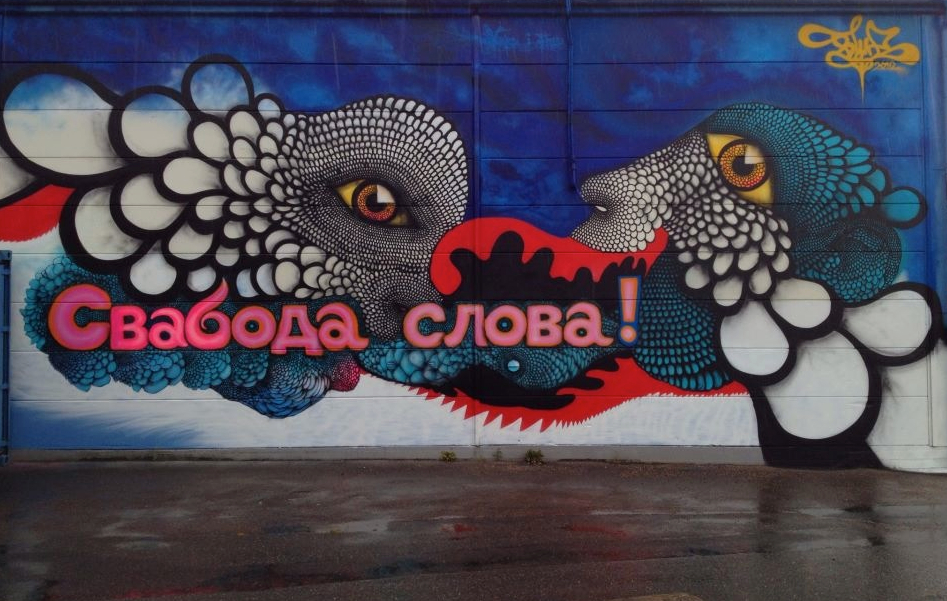
The painting Yttrandefrihet!/Cвабода слова!/Freedom of speech! in Alingsås, Sweden, 2012

Carolina Alexandra Falkholt (born 4 March 1977), also known under the pseudonym Blue, is a Swedish artist, graffiti writer and musician. Sometimes she uses her own coined term grafitta, to describe her art. It is a play with the two words graffiti and fitta, the latter means "pussy" in Swedish.

== Biography ==
=== Early life ===
Falkholt was born in Gothenburg. Falkholt grew up in Dals Långed, Dalsland, Sweden. As a teenager, she moved to Stockholm to go to the waldorf school Kristofferskolan. At the same time she began painting graffiti under the pseudonym Blue. By the mid-1990s, she moved to New York City. There, as the only Swedish artist, she became a member of the two crews The Fantastic Partners and Hardcore Chickz. She worked with graffiti writers such as Sento and Lady Pink while making paintings around New York for the record company Rawkus to earn a living. Around the turn of the century, she was one of Sweden's most famous graffiti writers. After four years in New York, she moved back to Sweden and settled in Gothenburg where she is active today.

=== Artistic practice ===
In addition to spray paint and drawing, Falkholt's practice involve collage, sculpture, installation, performance, film and photo. She often builds up her drawings with endless amounts of circles creating a web, sometimes over vibrant colors. Typical motifs she has explored in her art are connected to the body, including eyes, ears, the mouth, hands and the vulva. Many of her paintings of hands are actually letters, since she is using Swedish Sign Language in her art. She is also a musician and has released records as part of her artistic practice. In several projects she has initiated various forms of collaboration with other artists, musicians, the public and organizations.

In 2010, Falkholt realized the big project Graffiti Mariestad that circulated around a now demolished silo in Mariestad harbor. During a number of months before the building was to be dismantled, the façade was painted while activities in and around the silo were ongoing. The project involved about 30 graffiti writers, including Nug, Rubin and Dwane, musicians, dancers, artists and hundreds of young people. The project resulted in one of the world's largest graffiti paintings. The project Graffiti Mariestad also resulted in Falkholt being commissioned to create a public sculpture in Mariestad, which was built, among other things, from material from the demolished silo. The twelve-meter high sculpture T.E.S.T. was inaugurated in June 2011. The whole process is documented in the book Silo – Dokumentation av Carolina Falkholts konstprojekt Graffiti Mariestad.

Falkholt has had solo exhibitions at Gothenburg Museum of Art, Eskilstuna Museum of Art, Ystad Art Museum, Steneby Konsthall in Dalsland and Klippans konsthall in Skåne., among others. In 2013, she was one of the participants in the Sveriges Television program Konstkuppen and that same year she curated and participated as an artist in the exhibition Mynningsladdare (Muzzleloader) at Röda Sten Konsthall in Gothenburg. In the same year, she participated in the X-Border biennial with the project Firewall with paintings in the three towns Severomorsk, Rovaniemi and Luleå and made the 16-meter long piece Wet Paint at The House of Culture (Stockholm) in Stockholm. Falkholt is represented by, among others, Gothenburg Museum of Art, Skövde Museum of Art and Halland Museum of Cultural History. In 2014, she made the painting Övermålning (Overpainting) as a commission for a highschool in Nyköping. She started by writing derogatory words towards women on the wall and then painted them over with a stylized motif of the lower part of a woman's naked body. The artwork created a heated argument which was covered in media, both in Sweden and internationally. At one point politicians took the decision to build a wall in front of the painting. But Falholt and the painting had many strong supporters. The principal of the school said: "I see many pedagogic advantages to having her art in the school". After much debate the wall in front of the painting was taken down. In connection with this debate she made a performance at Konstakademien in Stockholm, where she invited politicians to Skenbröllop, a sham marriage with her. Two politicians said yes, Marita Ulvskog (Swedish Social Democratic Party) and Sissela Nordling Blanco (Feminist Initiative).

In 2015, she made a huge mural as a commission for the high school Parkskolan in Ystad. The painting Untitled (Firewall), depict yet another stylized naked woman haning upside down with her legs in an unnatural contorted position. 2017 she was invited as one on the artist for the exhibition SculptureMotion at Wanås sculpture park, together with William Forsythe, Henrik Plenge Jakobsen, Sonia Khurana and Éva Mag. For this exhibition she did the work Train of Thoughts, a railroad car moved to the woods, first painted white and then filled with her black circles creating an organic web over the whole surface.

In December 2017 she painted a 40-foot erect human penis on a building at 303 Broome Street, New York City. She signed the artwork on the lower right hand side. The mural was painted over by the buildings owner three days later.

==== Fuck the World ====
Fuck the World was a mural by Falkholt depicting an erect blue penis, covering five storeys of an apartment block (59°20′04.8″N 18°02′05″E) in Stockholm, Sweden.

The work was unveiled in April 2018 on Kronobergsvägen in the Kungsholmen district of Stockholm. Falkholt whose work explores human sexuality said of it: "They should consider what it is they are so upset about and then talk about it" and "Sex is so important, but it's always been too dirty to discuss."

Falkholt was confident that Stockholm residents would be receptive to the work and that it would avoid the fate of an earlier work of a pink and orange penis which was painted on the side of a four-storey building in lower Manhattan in December 2017, but was painted over after a few weeks. However following complaints from neighbouring residents, it was announced a week after being unveiled that the work is to be painted over.

== Gallery ==
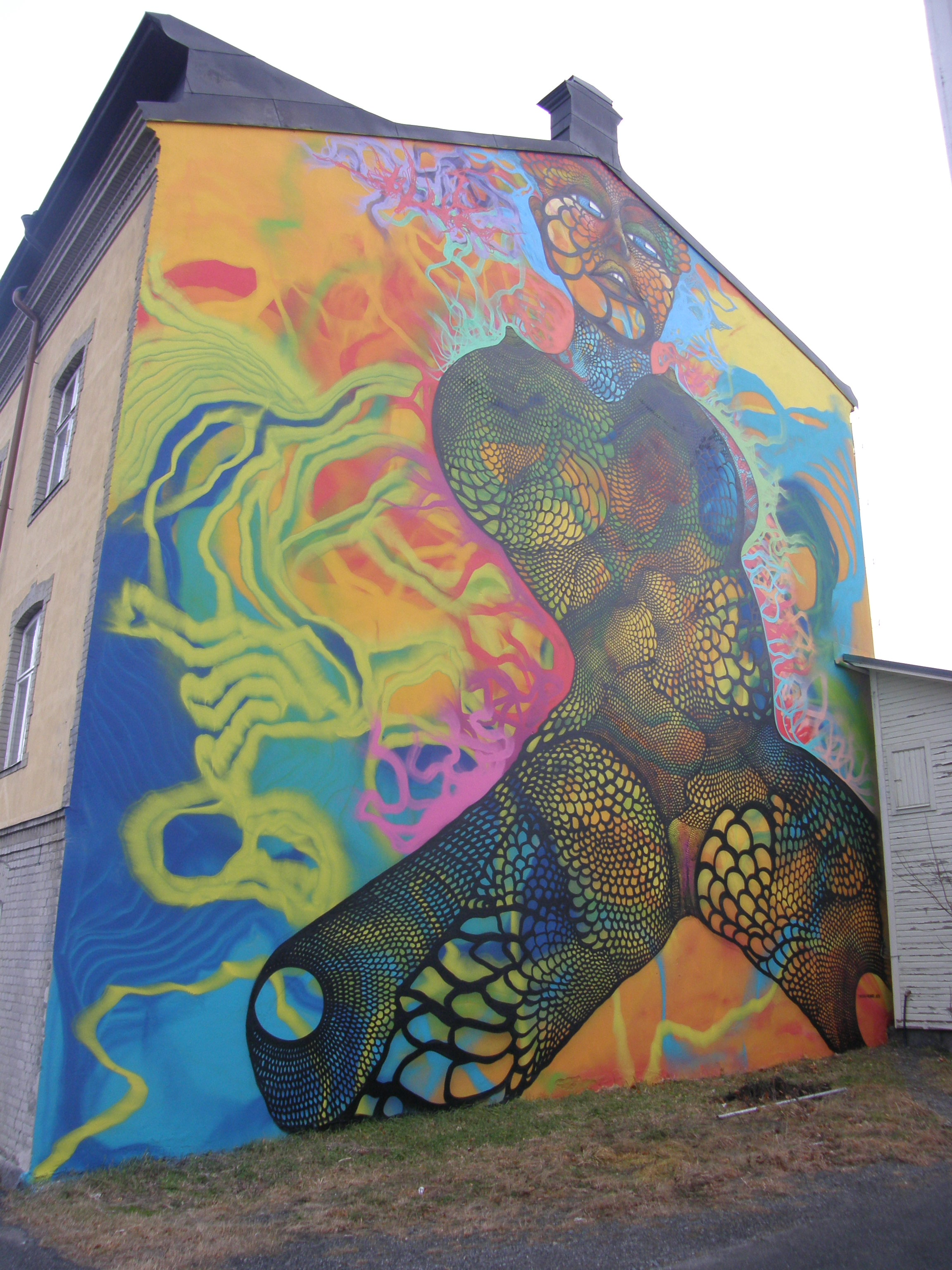
Mural, Holmgatan, Kronholmen, Härnösand

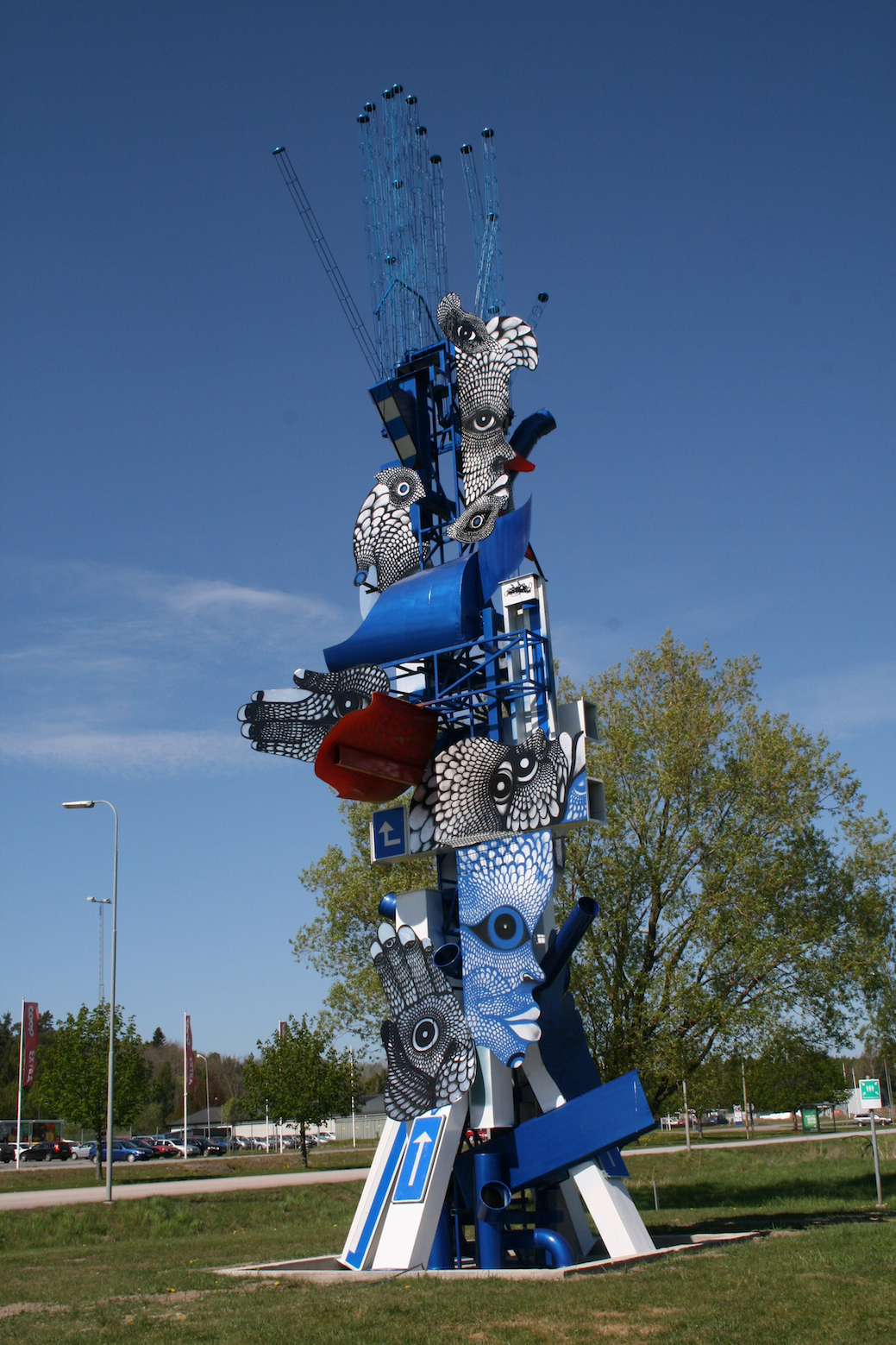
The sculpture T.E.S.T. in Mariestad, Sweden, 2010–2011.

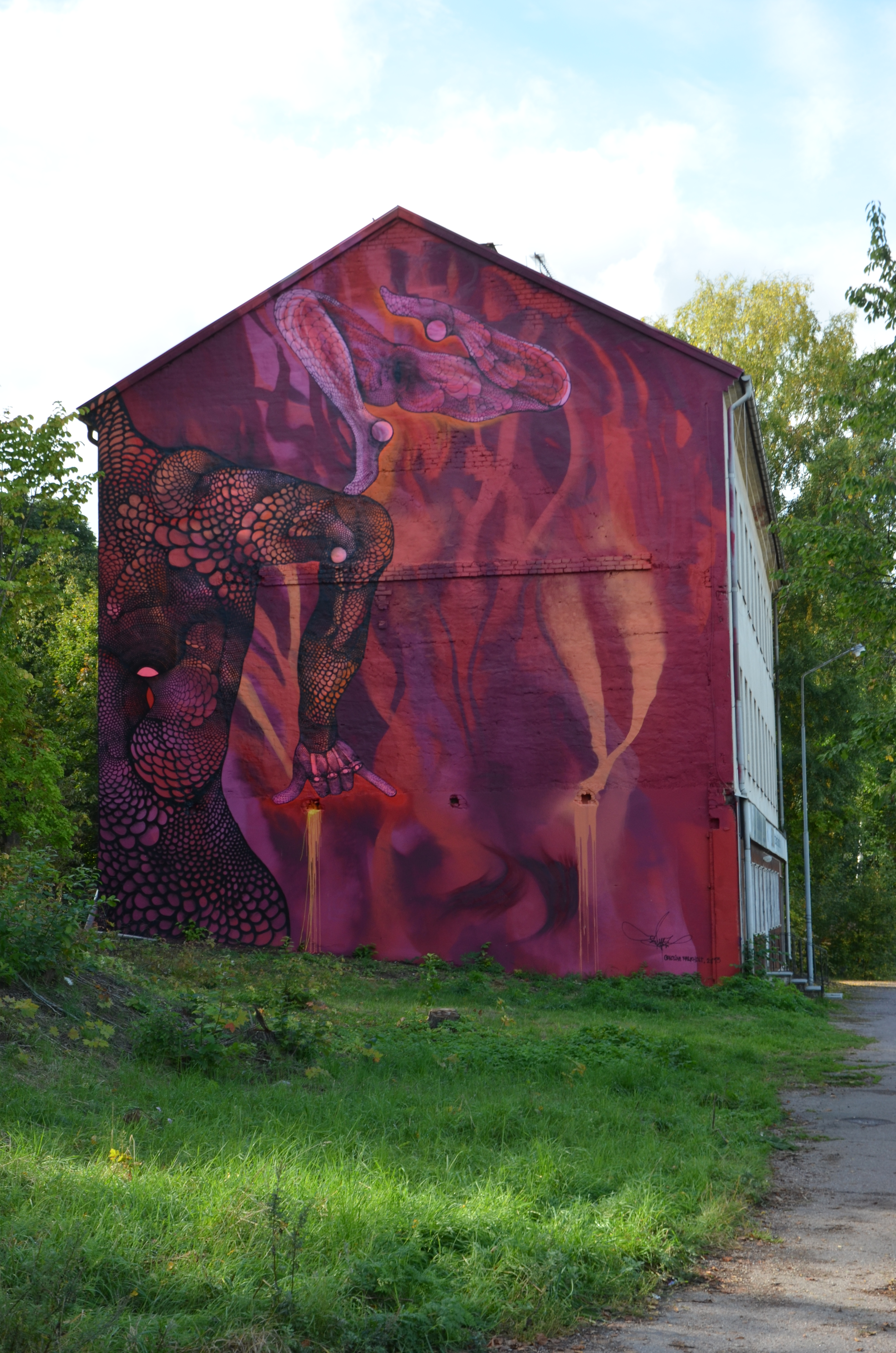
Mural, Avesta, 2013

== Public works (in selection) ==
- T.E.S.T. , Mariestad, Sweden, 2011–12
- Wall painting on the facade of Bengtsfors Sports Hall, Sweden, 2012
- Freedom of expression, Järnvägsgatan in Alingsås, Sweden, 2012
- Facade painting on a day-care building in Durrës, Albania, 2013
- Untitled, Bergslagsvägen 43, Avesta, Sweden, 2013
- Pi, on the facade of the student house Jakten, Halmstad, Sweden, 2013
- Untitled (Firewall), Borås, Sweden, 2014
- Övermålning, Nyköping High School, Nyköping, Sweden, 2014
- Untitled (Firewall), wall painting at Parkskolan in Ystad, Sweden, 2015
- Untitled (Firewall), wall painting, Södra Dragongatan in Ystad, Sweden, 2015
- Fountain, GrEEK Campus, Cairo, Egypt, 2015
- TECHNE, Mimers house of Culture, Kungälv, Sweden, 2016
- Fuck the World, Kungsholmen, Stockholm, Sweden, 2018
