= Solidarity with Ukraine (Banksy) =

Series of Banksy street murals in Ukraine

Solidarity with Ukraine is an unofficial title often given to the series of Banksy street murals that appeared in Ukraine in November 2022.

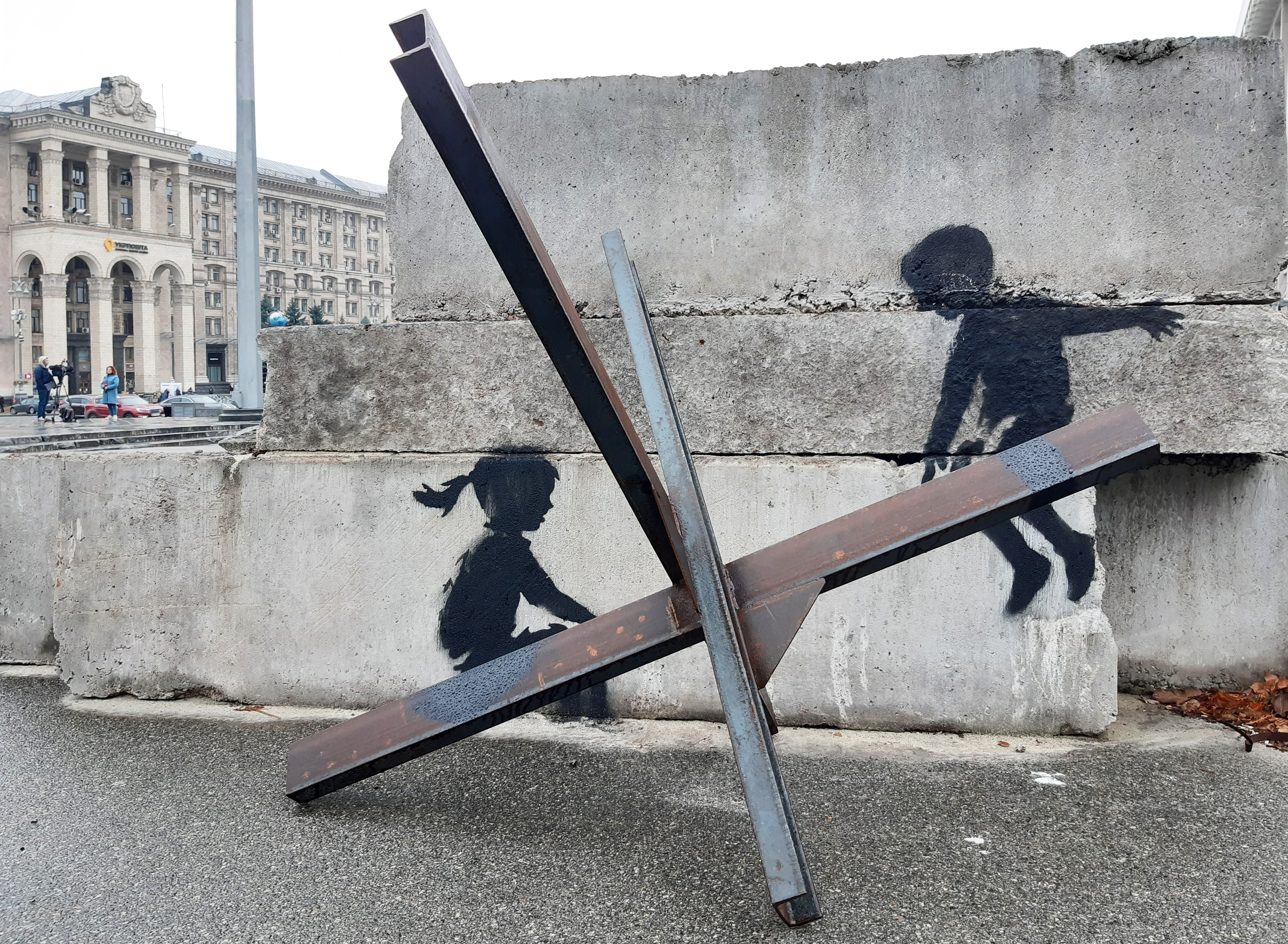
Maidan Nezalezhnosti (Independence Square), Kyiv

== Background ==
All of the murals in the series portray the reality of war and the suffering of the Ukrainian people. One image of a woman in a bathrobe wearing a gas mask was removed from the wall, believed to be in an attempt to sell and profit from Banksy's artwork. Ukrainian media reported that the perpetrator could face up to 12 years in jail for the crime.

== Artwork ==
In total, Banksy was responsible for seven different artworks in the nation. Among those:

- two children using a metal tank trap as a seesaw (Kyiv);
- a young boy throwing a man to the floor during a judo match; the man is seen as putin who's known to have gone in for judo (Borodianka, a rural settlement in Kyiv Oblast);
- a gymnast doing a handstand (Borodianka);
- a woman in her dressing gown, hair in curlers, wearing a gas mask and holding a fire extinguisher (Hostomel, a rural settlement in Kyiv Oblast);
- another gymnast with a ribbon (Irpin, a city in Kyiv Oblast);
- an old bearded man taking a bath (Horenka, a village in Kyiv Oblast);
- the piece in which the artist used an existing phallic graffiti as a nuclear warhead loaded onto a Russian (marked with Z) armoured military truck (Kyiv).

Children of War and Judo Match were the most notable artworks.

== See also ==
- List of works by Banksy
