= Vaj (street artist) =

Feminist graffiti artist based in Bristol, England

- Born: 1989 or 1990 (age 36–37)
- Known for: Street art
- Style: Stencil graffiti
- Movement: Feminism
- Website: Vaj Graff on X

Vaj, also known as Vaj Graff, is a feminist street artist based in Bristol, United Kingdom. Active as a feminist graffiti artist since July 2015, her style is similar to Banksy. In January 2016, she controversially added legs and pubic hair to the Queen Victoria statue in College Green, Bristol. This was removed within 24 hours by the local council. Her art has a feminist purpose in an area dominated by men.

== Background ==
Vaj is also known as VAJ, Vaj Graff and Vaj DGAF. Although, Vaj herself rejects Vaj Graff, claiming the name is used by the media to identify her because it is her Twitter handle. She said no one calls her that.

Her identity is unknown, but in 2016 she was described as a 26-year-old living in Fishponds, Bristol. She has a criminal record.

== Art ==
Her work uses a style of stencilling similar to Banksy. It often features female genitalia that appear on buildings and monuments. She became active as a graffiti artist in July 2015, with her early work getting little attention.

Vaj claims to have started her street art work when she was five years old after witnessing a boy draw a penis on the playground using chalk on the sidewalk. She went over to where he was and did something similar.

She was one of several artists featured in the satirical documentary, The Art Bastard Show. Other artists in the documentary included Vicky Yentob, Toby Glass and, vegan taxidermist Lily Rose. The film was screened at the No Gloss Film Festival 2016. She has never had a fine arts exhibit of her work.

=== Queen Victoria statue ===
On a Thursday evening in early January 2016, Vaj controversially added legs and pubic hair to the Queen Victoria statue in College Green, Bristol. The act took place in daylight hours, with passersby taking pictures of the artist making the addition. The addition to the statue was removed within 24 hour of being added. A petition was created to urging Vaj to apologize for her work. Another petition was created requesting her work be brought back.

Local graffiti artist Gary Locke criticized her work, saying, "Says a lot about Bristol these days [that] a vandal can go about defacing a historical statue in the centre of Bristol in broad daylight and not one bystander tried to stop it or report it. Shameful. [...] What sort of city are we becoming?" Heather McGowan and Myla Lloyd criticized her work compared to Banksy's, saying that it lacked a political message.

Vaj said her intention was not to degenerate national heritage. Responding to criticisms of the defacement of the statue, the artist said "If Banksy’s allowed to paint a naked man hanging out a window of a sex clinic, then why can’t Queen Vic be seen in all her glory?" She also said, "“A lot of haters out there calling it vandalism. It ain’t vandalism. It’s a statement. Stand tall. Stand proud and love the vaj.” Vaj told FEMAIL that Bristol lacks female street artists, and the quick removal was an example of sexism. She was quoted by the publication Bristol 24/7 as saying of the quick removal, "'Other side of the street from Queen Vic is a Banksy cock, a naked man with his cock out and cos it's a Banksy the council are lovin it." She also pointed out that while Banksy's street art was protected, her similar work was criminalized. She argued that this was in part due to Banksy's status as a tourist attraction and the financial value his work provides to Bristol City Council.

=== Feminist aspects ===
Her art has a feminist purpose, and she has said she is on a mission to address the gender inequalities in street art. She told the Bristol Post, "The art world is male dominated. Fact. Street art is male dominated. Fact. So I've got to represent. I've got to redress the balance. [...] Queen Vic was a power woman. She was the original feminist and she was proud. All I did was show her how she wanted to be seen. What's so offensive about that?" Her work also brings attention to double standards in the art world. "They [MailOnline] are saying my Vaj is offensive but when you look down the side of that site what do you see?" Graff asked. "Women with their tits out ... Double standards are everywhere."

Her artwork faced criticism from feminists, even as male artists have been praised for their depiction of female genitalia. Lloyd is one such feminist critic, saying there were a number of well-known female graffiti artists whose "unique work [...] often challenges the status quo", which she contrasted to Vaj "defacing a public monument." Lloyd also argued that Vaj's addition to the Queen Victoria statue was ineffective as a statement because everyone already knew that Queen Victoria had female genitalia. Vaj has said that male artists spray painting penises is about demarking space as intrinsically male. Women painting women in this way also serves as a reminder that women exist.
