= Röda Sten Konsthall =

Swedish art centre

Röda Sten Konsthall is a contemporary art center located in the district of Majorna under Älvsborg Bridge in Gothenburg, Sweden. Konsthall roughly translates to "Art Gallery" however the organization is much more similar to a German Kunsthalle. Röda Sten Konsthall is an exhibition space for a diverse range of cultural events and art exhibitions, is home to Gothenburg's only legal graffiti wall "Draken" and hosts a rich program of educational activities for all ages.

RSK presents an exhibition program of contemporary art and has collaborated with Swedish and international artists such as Jeremy Deller, Carsten Höller, Natalie Djurberg/Hans Berg, Ylva Ogland, Phil Collins, and Rachel Maclean, among many others, is home to the Göteborg International Biennial for Contemporary Art, collaborates with Valand Academy to exhibit the photography program's degree show, hosts choral and opera performances at the beginning of each year and since 2013 has held a design and craft focused Christmas market.

== History ==
Röda Sten Konsthall was originally built in 1940 as an old boiler house that supplied the industries of Klippan with heat. It was then used as a warehouse for hazardous waste, abandoned and stood empty for many years. The building, owned by the city of Gothenburg, was set to be demolished as it was seen as a "festering sore" on the city, because it was home to intense rave parties and covered in graffiti. This was the place that inspired Kulturprojekt Röda Sten.

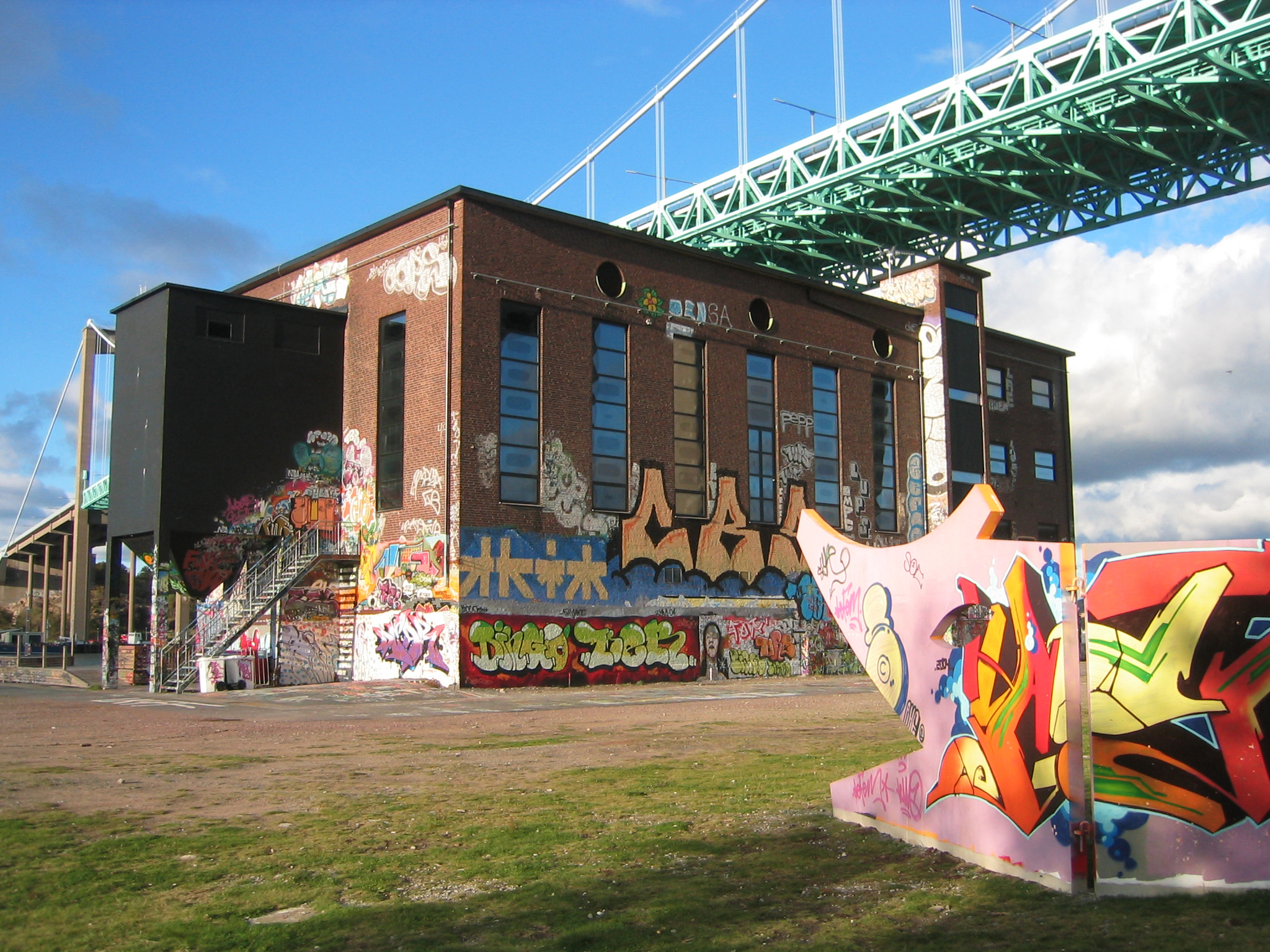
Röda Sten Konsthall and Gothenburg's only legal graffiti wall "Draken".

Bob Kelly, a businessman and entrepreneur, had seen how people in the USA and England were renovating and re-purposing old factory buildings into spaces for cultural and artistic activities. He believed the boiler house had the potential to become a similar project. Kelly contacted Per Hållén, who at the time was a district committee representative of the Left Party for the Majorna district of Gothenburg, and who from January 1992 was also a member of the Gothenburg City Council. Kelly and Hållén then approached Folke Edwards the Director of the Gothenburg Museum of Art and Akke Zimdal, an architect from the firm Lund&Valentin to add an art institutional/architectural perspectives to the group. These four “founders” soon expanded the group by adding people with different strengths: artist and former professor of painting Kent Karlsson, and economist Lars Strannegård.

=== First functions at Röda Sten ===
During the summer of 1994, the Property Management Administration completed a provisional repair of the boiler house. The premiere program was a newly composed “psycho-acoustic” opera performance based on Dostoyevsky’s novel The Idiot.

In September 1994, thirty-seven artists from Majorna exhibited their work in the boiler house as a manifestation of Kulturprojekt Röda Sten.

October 1994 brought another exhibition: Ready for Landing, an installation by Michel and Eva Droetto. Forty-five tons of soil were trucked in for the exhibition and covered the floor in the cathedral.

In 1995, the Friends of Röda Sten Association was established, and during 1995–1999 the Röda Sten Project was dedicated to finding financing and planning for the renovation of the building.

=== Renovation and inauguration ===
Shipping magnate Sten Allan Olsson pledged a donation of three million SEK (approximately 360,000 USD) toward the boiler house renovation. The County Labor Board contributed free labor, and the National Board of Housing, Building and Planning offers one million SEK (approximately 120,000 USD) to the renovation. Sören Mannheimer, chairperson of the Chalmers Technical University Foundation, offers 500,000 SEK (approximately 60,000 USD) toward the property renovation and an equal amount for collaboration between artists from Röda Sten and technology students from Chalmers.

Between September 1999 and September 2000, the boiler house was renovated. On October 6, 2000, the renovated boiler house was rededicated.

== From Culture Project to Konsthall ==
=== 2005 ===
Röda Sten hires its first General Director, Mia Christerdotter Norman.

=== 2006 ===
The association changes its name from Kulturprojekt Röda Sten to Röda Sten Kulturförening (Röda Sten Cultural Association).

The Municipal Cultural Affairs Committee asks Röda Sten Kulturförening to arrange the 2007 Göteborg International Biennial for Contemporary Art (GIBCA)

=== 2007 ===
The pilot for the arts education & social program Young & Creative begins.

The Executive Board decides to establish a new, independent program committee composed of Henrik Andersson, Lisa Rosendahl, and Fredrik Svensk.

Röda Sten Kulturförening becomes a member of Trans Europe Halles (TEH).

Edi Muka and Joa Ljungberg are the Curators of GIBCA 2007: Rethinking Dissent.

=== 2009 ===
Röda Sten hires its first full-time curator, Edi Muka.

Johan Poussette and Celia Prado are Curators of GIBCA 2009: What a Wonderful World.

=== 2010 ===
The Executive Board decides that the boiler house and its operations as a whole should be called Röda Sten Konsthall.

The exhibition program begins, with Edi Muka as a curator. It displays international contemporary art and focuses on site-specific exhibits.

=== 2012 ===
Göteborg International Biennial for Contemporary Art appoints its first Artistic Directors. Stina Eblom (who had been Co-Curator for the biennial in 2011) together with Edi Muka, Röda Sten Konsthall's Curator.

Draken, Gothenburg's only legal graffiti wall is inaugurated.

=== 2014 ===
Aukje Lepoutre Ravn is appointed Curator of Röda Sten Konsthall and Artistic Director for GIBCA 2015 alongside Stina Edblom.

=== 2017 ===
Mariangela Mendez Prencke is appointed Curator of Röda Sten Konsthall.

Ioana Leca is appointed Artistic Director for GIBCA 2019.

== Exhibitions at Röda Sten Konsthall 2010-2018 ==
=== 2018 ===
Delcy Morelos: Inner Earth

Annika Dahlsten & Markku Laakso: Diorama

=== 2017 ===
Julian Rosefeldt: Asylum

Hanne Nielsen & Birgit Johnsen: Protect/ Release

WE ARE THE REMIX: Halil Altindere, Korakrit Arunanondchai, Jeremy Deller & Cecilia Bengolea, Carsten Höller & Måns Månsson, Vincent Moon & Priscilla Telmon, Nastivicious, Rachel Maclean, Anne de Vries. Exhibition design by MUSEEA - Sofia Hedman and Serge Martynov

GIBCA 2017: WheredoIendandyoubegin Curated by Nav Haq

=== 2016 ===
IC-98 - Tides of Time

Surfacing Earth - A group exhibition featuring six artists and three artist collaborations whose practices reflect upon the changing awareness of landscape in the age of the Anthropocene: Rosa Barba, Ursula Biemann & Paulo Tavares, Bigert & Bergström, Tiril Hasselknippe, Marie Kølbæk Iversen, Ferdinand Ahm Krag, Astrid Myntekær, Yasuaki Onishi, Reynold Reynolds & Patrick Jolley

Pinar Yoldas: The Warm, the Cool and the Cat

=== 2015 ===
Carlos Motta - For Democracy There Must Be Love

Reverberations - A group exhibition exploring sound’s relationship with form, space and memory. Featuring: Janet Cardiff, Mikael Ericsson, Jonas Gazell, Babette Mangolte, José Luis Martinat, Ursula Nistrup, Kirstine Roepstorff, Vinyl, Terror- & Horror

GIBCA 2105: A story within a story... Curated by Elvira Dyangani Ose

=== 2014 ===
Adrian Paci: Of Lives and Tales

Lilibeth Cuenca Rasmussen: Musical skies, dropping down to earth, making trees fly

Ylva Ogland: Diverse Variations of Other Spaces

=== 2013 ===
Mynningsladdare: Group Exhibition featuring: AKAY, AMAN, BLUE, BUFF-IT, DWANE, EKTA, KARMA, NUG, PIKE, WIRAEUS - Curated by Carolina Falkholt

THE COMMON ROOF PROJECT: Stealth (dis)assembled.

GIBCA 2013: PLAY! Recapturing the Radical Imagination - curated by Katerina Gregos, Claire Tancons, Joanna Warsza, Ragnar Kjartansson & Andjeas Ejiksson

=== 2012 ===
Nathalie Djurberg and Hans Berg - Fåfänga försök

Phil Collins - Den mest sällskapliga ensamvarg jag någonsin mött

Plattform # 2

=== 2011 ===
Loulou Cherinet: Testaments Betrayed

(De)monterat [(De)constructed]: STEALTH.unlimited

GIBCA 2011: Pandemonium: Art in a Time of Creativity Fever - curated by Sarat Maharaj, Gertrud Sandqvist, Stina Edblom, and Dorothee Albrecht

=== 2010 ===
Sislej Xhafa - 2 075 BACI
