= Nug (graffiti artist) =

Swedish graffiti artist

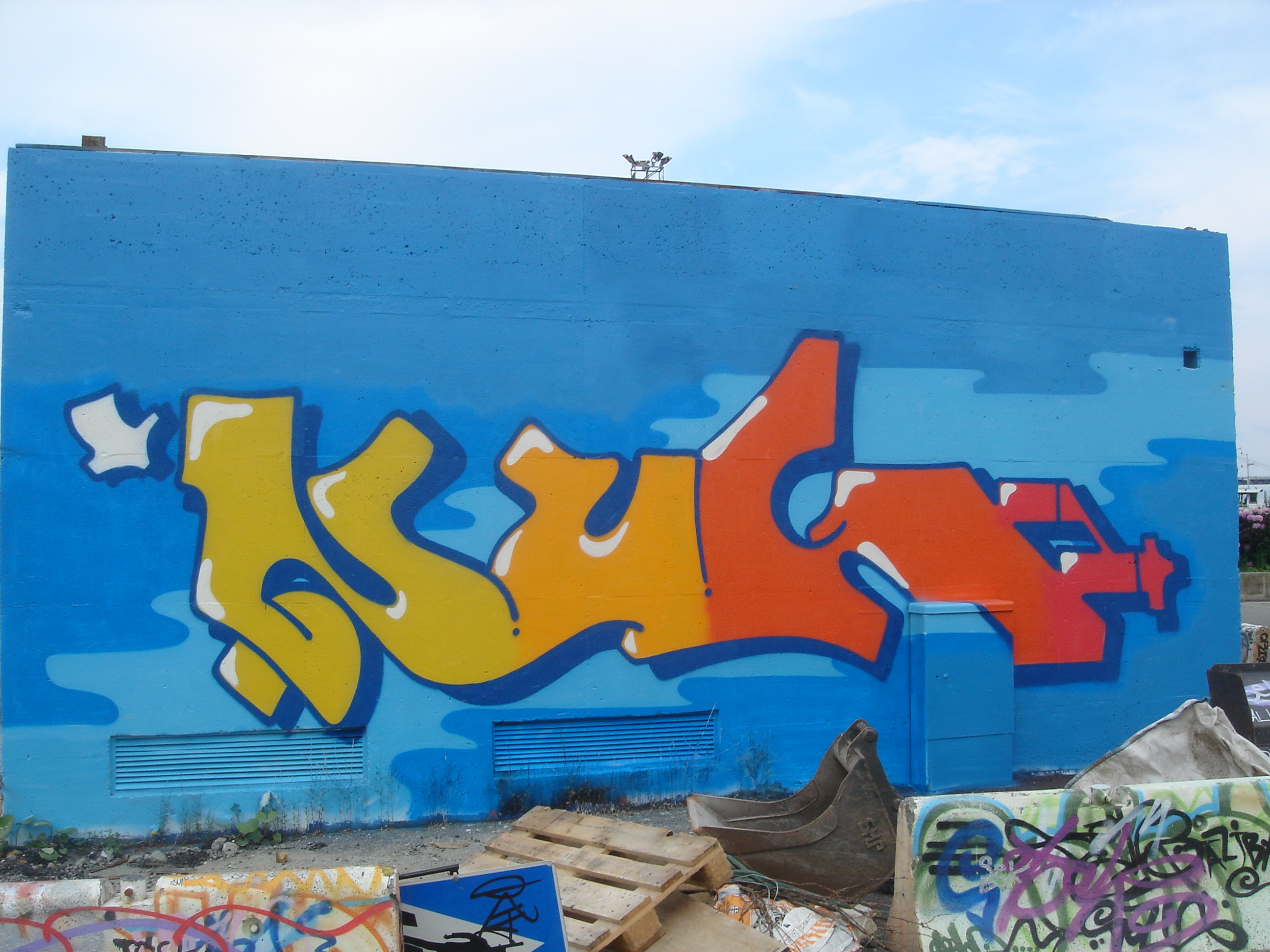
- Piece by Nug in Stavanger, 2010
- Born: Magnus Gustafsson; 1972 (age 53–54)
- Education: Konstfack
- Known for: Sweden's most prolific graffiti artist
- Notable work: Territorial Pissing
- Style: Train painting
- Movement: Graffiti

Magnus Gustafsson (born 1972), known by his tag Nug, is a Swedish graffiti artist.

== Career ==
He has been active in the Stockholm area and been called one of the worst graffiti vandals in Sweden but his works have also been shown at places like the art fair Market. Nug started painting graffiti illegally in the mid-1980s and popularised painting trains while they were still in service (rather than parked at the depot). He was part of the notorious crew "VIM" (Vandals In Motion).

Nug studied art at the art college Konstfack where he earned a Master of Arts degree in 2008. His degree project, presented in 2008, was called Territorial Pissing, a film showing a masked man spraying a subway car and the Stockholm station entrance, where he broke in to make one of the scenes in "Territorial Pissing". The project attracted attention in the media and was condemned by Sweden's former Minister of Culture Lena Adelsohn Liljeroth when it was exhibited by an art gallery in February 2009, and led to widespread criticism of Konstfack. The criminal investigation against Nug was dropped in April 2009 because it was not clear if he is the masked man in the film.

Konstfack has stated that regardless of the criminal nature of the project, basic administrative law regulations do not permit his degree to be revoked but the school is investigating if they made any errors when they let him use this work for graduation.
