= Phallic graffiti =

Type of graffiti representing male genitalia

- A phallus graffit on the floor in Neu-Ulm, 2026
- Type: Phallus
- Material: Spray paint; Marker pen; Sgraffito
- Classification: Graffiti

Phallic graffiti (alternatively dick graffiti, penis graffiti, or cock and balls graffiti) is the illustration of the male sex organ rendered as graffiti. Phallic graffiti commonly incorporate both the penis and testicles and, while they can be considered lewd in nature, have been produced in specific cultural settings throughout history.

== History ==
=== Graffiti in Antiquity ===
==== Greece ====
At the beginning of the 21st century, phallic graffiti dating back to the 5th and 6th century BC were discovered on the Greek island of Astypalaia. Nearby inscriptions also revealed evidence of the carved illustrations being related to homosexual intercourse. The inscriptions were some of the oldest known graffiti of phalli recorded.

==== Rome ====
Archeological records have shown the phallus to have been a common symbol in ancient Roman graffiti. Hadrian's Wall, bordering the northern frontier of the former Roman province of Britannia, is notable for the abundant examples of phallic graffiti carved upon it. While in the metropole the divine fascinus could serve as a good luck symbol, at the outer reaches of the empire phallic graffiti have been interpreted as representative of the latent sexual violence of imperialism. In 2022 a volunteer excavating part of the Vindolanda site in Northumberland discovered a rock inscribed with a personal insult, Secundinus cacator, alongside a representation of a penis. More phallic graffiti have been unearthed at Vindolanda than anywhere else along Hadrian's Wall.

=== Graffiti in the Middle Ages ===
During the Middle Ages phallic motifs, such as the phallus tree, were often present in marginalia. Graffiti depictions of medieval ballock knyves have also been interpreted as phallic symbols, although they may have had a more nuanced meaning, representing a rite of passage into adulthood for adolescent boys.

=== Early Modern Graffiti ===
During the 17th century workers labouring on Valencia Cathedral in the Kingdom of Valencia are known to have produced phallic sgraffito over the work of Renaissance painter Paolo da San Leocadio. Their endeavours were rediscovered during renovation work at the cathedral in 2012.

Historical phallic graffiti
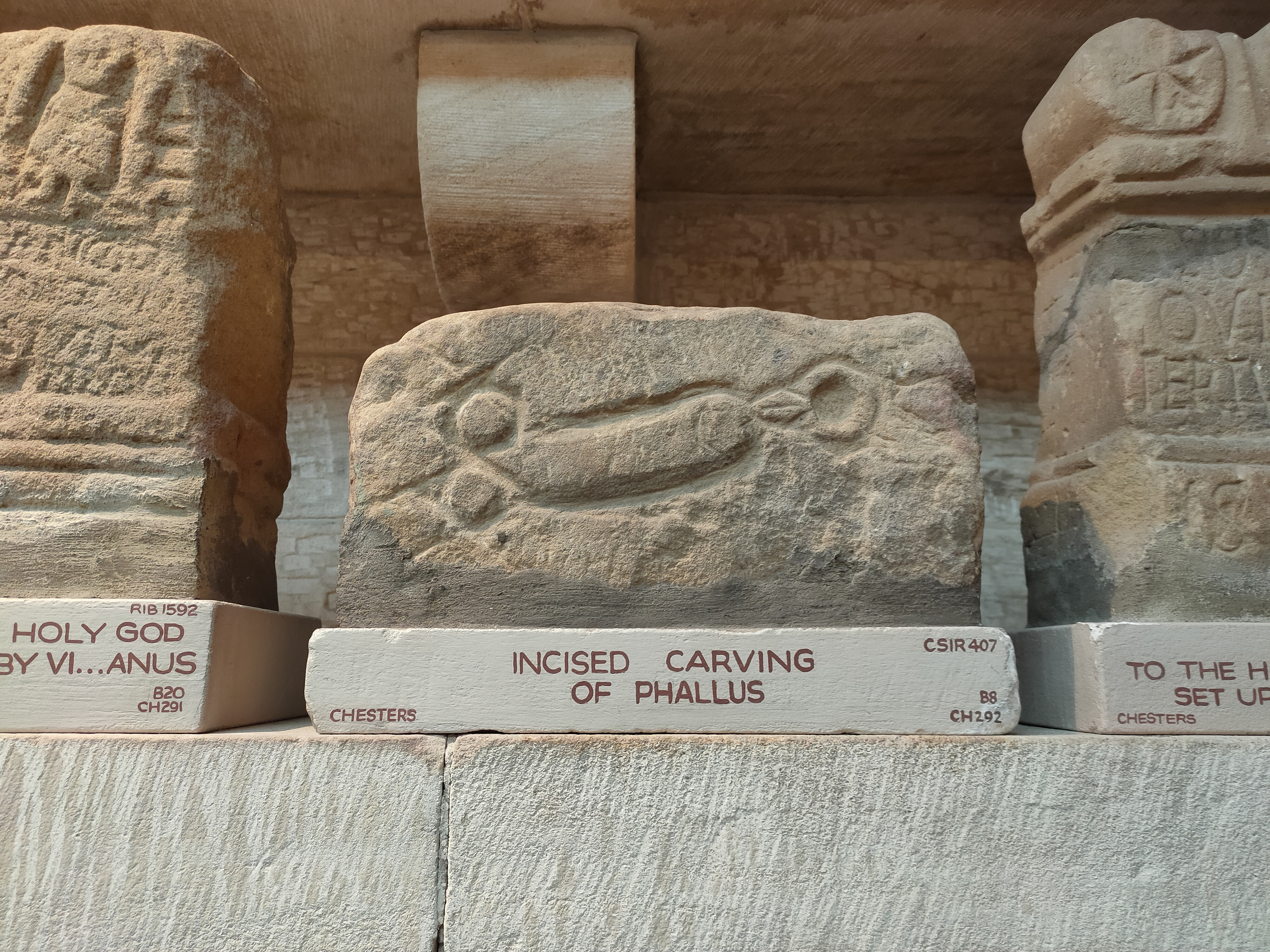
A typical example of an incised Roman phallus from Hadrian's Wall, displayed at Chesters

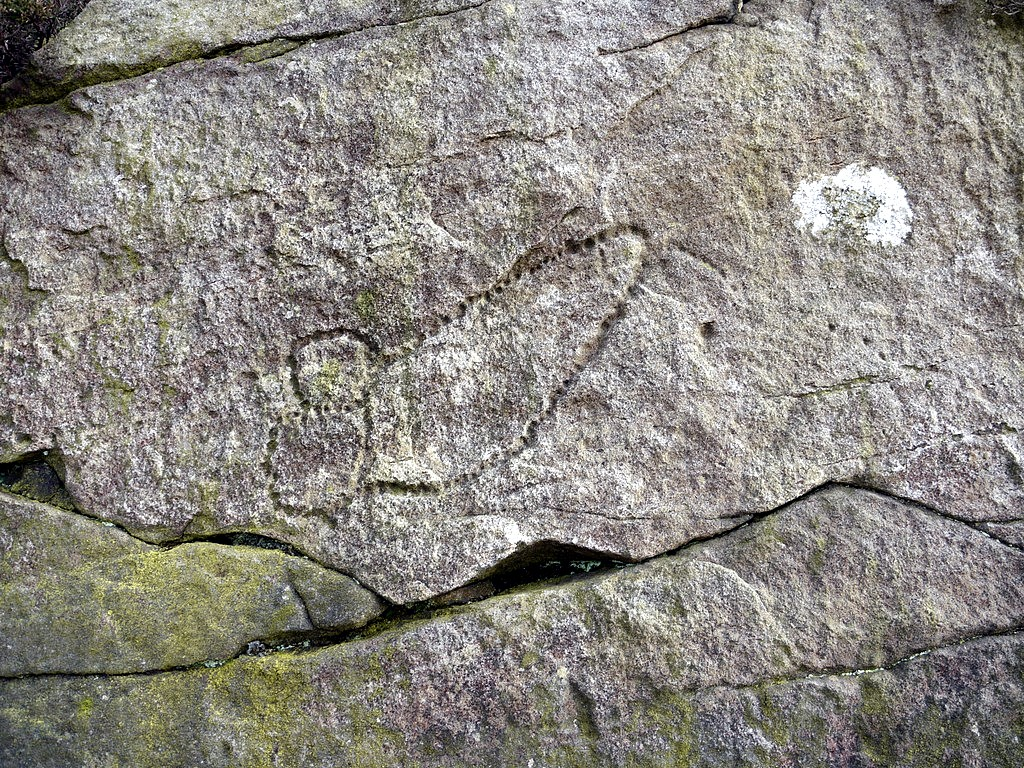
A phallic graffito carved into the side of the Roman quarry at Barcombe in East Sussex, England

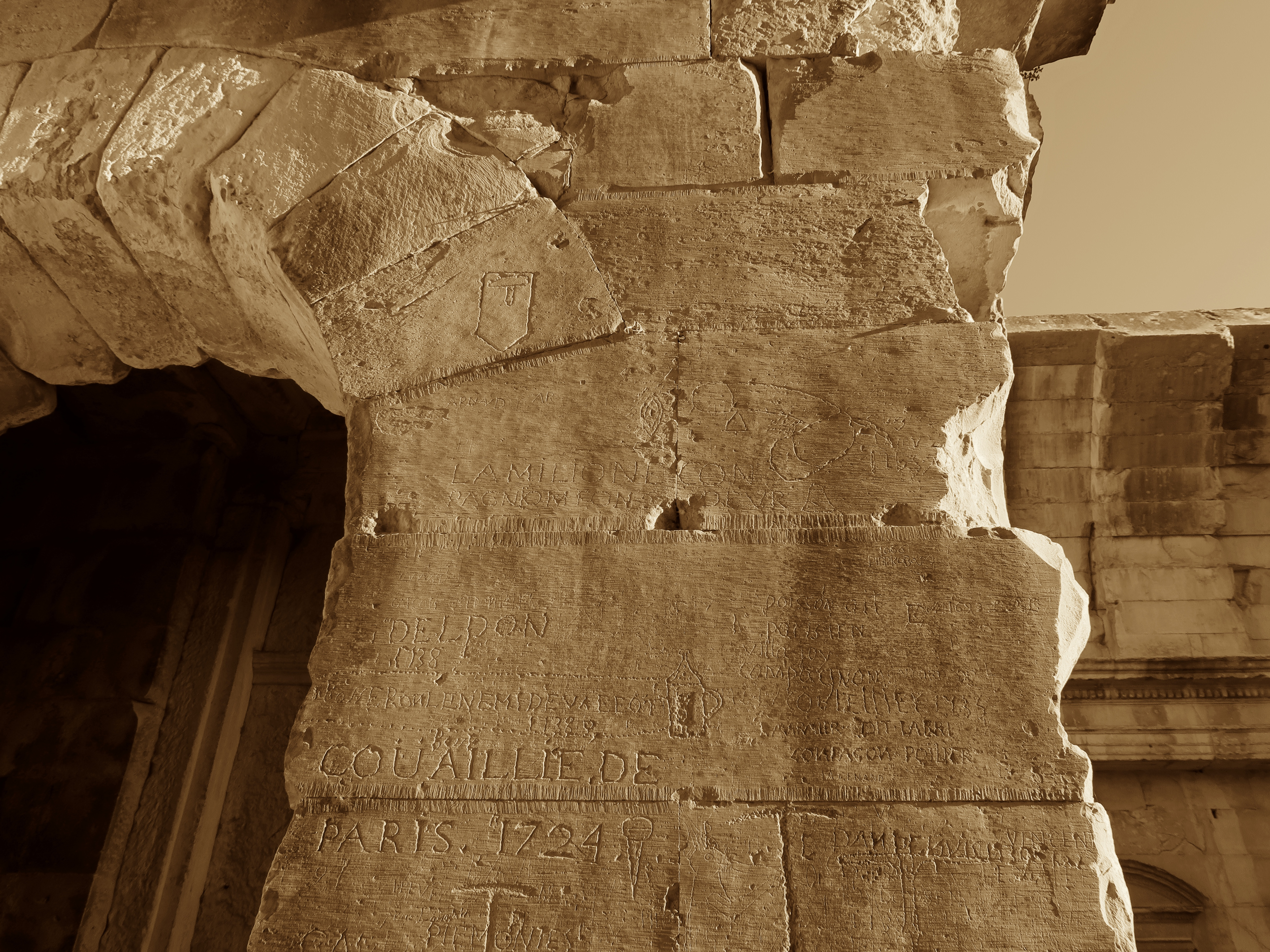
Early modern graffiti phallus on the walls of the Temple of Diana, Nîmes, France

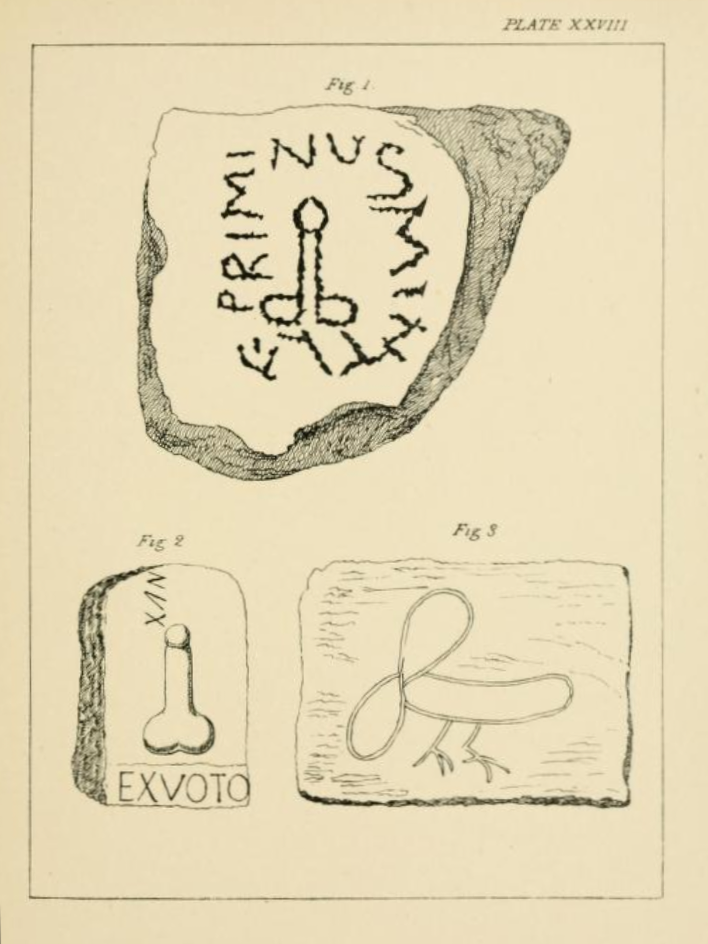
Illustration of phallic graffiti from A Discourse on the Worship of Priapus by Richard Payne Knight

== Contemporary phallic graffiti ==
In 2016 the arts website Widewalls declared the 21st century to be "a new age of penis graffiti". Contemporary phallic graffiti are produced in a variety of social contexts and can be understood accordingly. A rudimentary interpretation uses Freudian analysis of such inscriptions to conclude that they are a simple form of rebellion by marginalised groups such as the working class or children. However, phallic graffiti can represent complex commentaries on social relationships. In 2010, renovation work at the library of Utrecht University included the erasure of over 50 examples of phallic graffiti. The inscriptions had been created as part of a symbolic conflict between two groups of students organised into traditional societies (studentencorps). Utrecht students of a higher socio-economic background tended to emphasise the status of their society through the use of penis graffiti. However, students from less advantaged circumstances, aligned with the opposing society, lampooned the former with counter-penis graffiti. These socio-economic rivalries frequently came to a head. The phallic inscriptions represented the specific interplay of class conflict within Utrecht University's student cohort.

Particularly in a scholastic context, modern phallic graffiti have been likened to their ancient antecedents. For example, the phenomenon of penis inscriptions in English Secondary schools has been linked back to Roman veneration of Priapus, while phallic arborglyphs, such as that left on trees in Dulwich Wood by the so-called Penis Gang and attributed to local students, has been directly compared to their Ancient equivalent.

=== Artistic representations ===
In the 21st century phallic graffiti have been used as a form of artistic expression. In June 2010, the Russian street art group Voina painted a prodigious penis on the Liteyny Bridge in Saint Petersburg. The work, titled Dick Captured by the FSB, was placed on the road of the bridge situated opposite the offices of the Federal Security Service (FSB). Three minutes after the group had executed their artwork the bridge rose, thereby facing the now erect phallus directly at the offices of the FSB on the opposing side of the river. Immediately after the action had taken place, one member of the group involved was arrested at the site by police. Dick Captured by the FSB went on to be awarded the 2010 prize for innovation by the National Centre for Contemporary Arts.

In 2014 a stencil by Banksy in Folkestone, Kent titled Art Buff, depicting a woman staring at an empty plinth, had a phallus spray-painted over it as if part of the original.

In 2016 residents of Brussels petitioned for a series of sexually explicit street art pieces, which included a monumental painting of a phallus on the side of a building in the city centre, to be retained. A graffito of a penis was painted in the style of pointillism on a wall in the Saint-Gilles area of the city. Despite the public outcry, the council decided to remove the penis and replace it with a commissioned artwork.

=== Phallic graffiti and gender ===
Phallic graffiti are commonly assumed to have been executed by males, and is often particularly attributed to pubescent youths. For instance, the street artist Vaj has specifically identified phallic graffiti as an exercise in marking out public space as a male domain. Her analysis draws on a feminist critique which views the phenomenon of phallic graffiti as an example of toxic masculinity. Such renderings are thus considered to be overtly chauvinistic and amount to a visual extension of patriarchal power relations in public space.

The question over the gender identity of phallic graffiti artists has been portrayed in popular media such as the BBC One comedy-drama Love, Nina. In the fourth episode of the series, the characters, fictionalised members of Mary-Kay Wilmers’s household, debate the hypothetical gender of the painter of a cock and balls which has been sprayed onto their Primrose Hill property.

A 2016 study of latrinalia in London found that 46% of all illustrations drawn in male public toilets were phalluses. While equivalent graffiti in female public conveniences did include penes, this was at a rate of only 0.14% of overall illustrations. Female illustrators of phallic graffiti were discovered to have significantly enlarged the penis in relation to the testicles at a rate of 80:20 in comparison to that of males at 60:40.

Despite the common assumption that the gender of illustrators of phallic graffiti is male, many instances of women producing phallic graffiti have been recorded. For example, in 2017 the graffiti artist Carolina Falkholt painted a giant phallic graffito on the side of a building in Lower East Side, New York. The following year she replicated her original artwork on the side of a residential building in Kungsholmen, Stockholm. In an interview with Hyperallergic Falkholt said that the works reflected "the industrialized penile system." The Russian artist Natalia Sokol, a member of the street art collective Voina, took a prominent role in executing the group's phallic artwork on the Liteyny Bridge.

Sometimes interpreted as a pro-trans statement, the tag Penis Girl, which first came to prominence during the COVID-19 pandemic, is the pseudonym of a notable graffiti artist from Portland. Penis Girl tags were initially distributed across areas of East Portland, before spreading to Hawaii. Penis Girl provoked controversy within the graffiti art scene, inspiring both erasure and copycat tags. In 2022 the sculptor vanessa german produced the eponymous artwork titled PENIS GIRL, which featured a female figure adorned with 17 ceramic phalli.

In 2023 a Colombian female graffiti artist painted a phallus on a wall as part of a larger mural celebrating Afro-Colombians in Cartagena. The graffito proved controversial with local media outlets calling for the painting to be removed. The artist herself later claimed the work was a critique of sex tourism in the city.

=== As a form of advertising ===
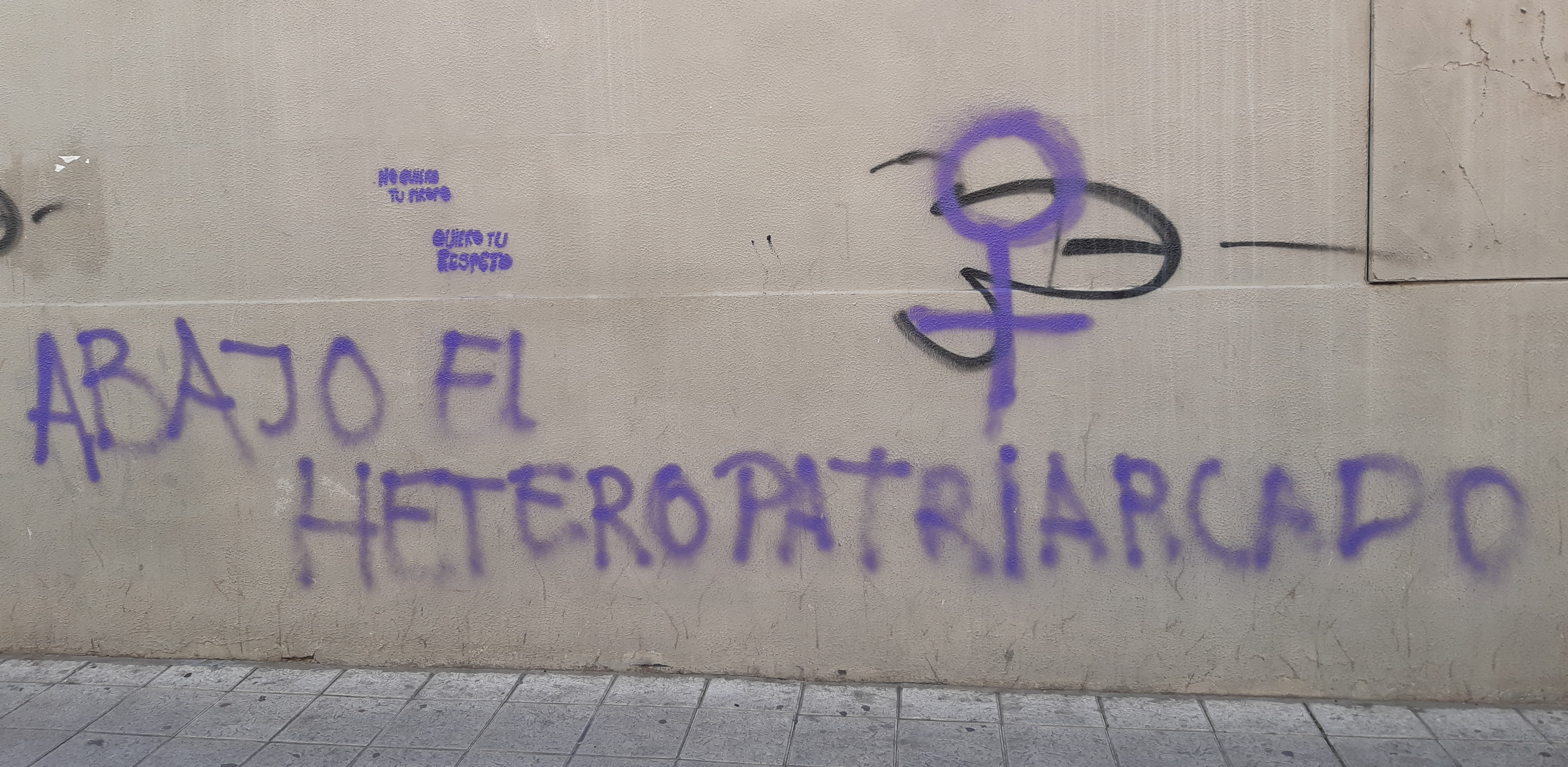
Graffiti reading Abajo el heteropatriarcado (‘Down with the heteropatriarchy’) alongside a Venus symbol covering phallic graffiti in León, 2019

Often considered lewd and indecent, phallic graffiti have been the target of responsive anti-phallic graffiti measures. Such campaigns have often incorporated a satirical element designed to publicly highlight issues of sexual health.

In 2017 an anonymous street artist in London began a campaign to highlight increasing rates of sexually transmitted infections by stencilling images of condoms over phallic graffiti. The campaign was initially designed to subvert phallic graffiti, which the artist opposed the presence of in public space.

A similar campaign was designed by the advertising agency McCann in 2022 in the Chilean capital of Santiago. The project used hand-shaped stickers which were then stuck over phallic graffiti as a way to bring attention to the issue of testicular cancer.

=== As a form of protest ===
Activists complaining against potholes in Britain and Spain have noticed that marking the potholes with penis graffiti can shame the authorities into fixing them when formal protest does not get attention, ensuring a much faster climax to the civic dispute. Activists risk fines if caught, however.

== Gallery ==
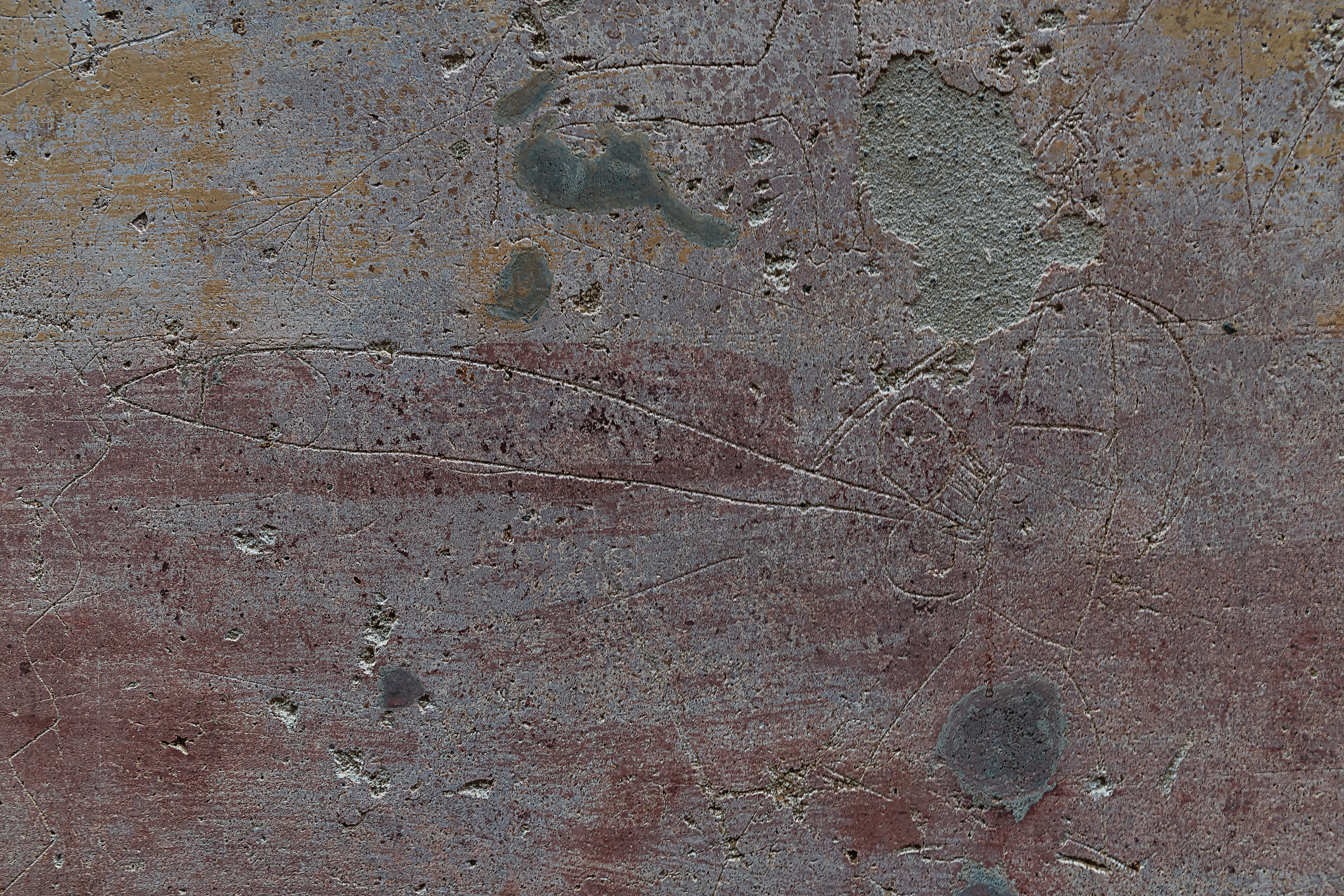
Phallic graffito at the Odeon in Pompeii

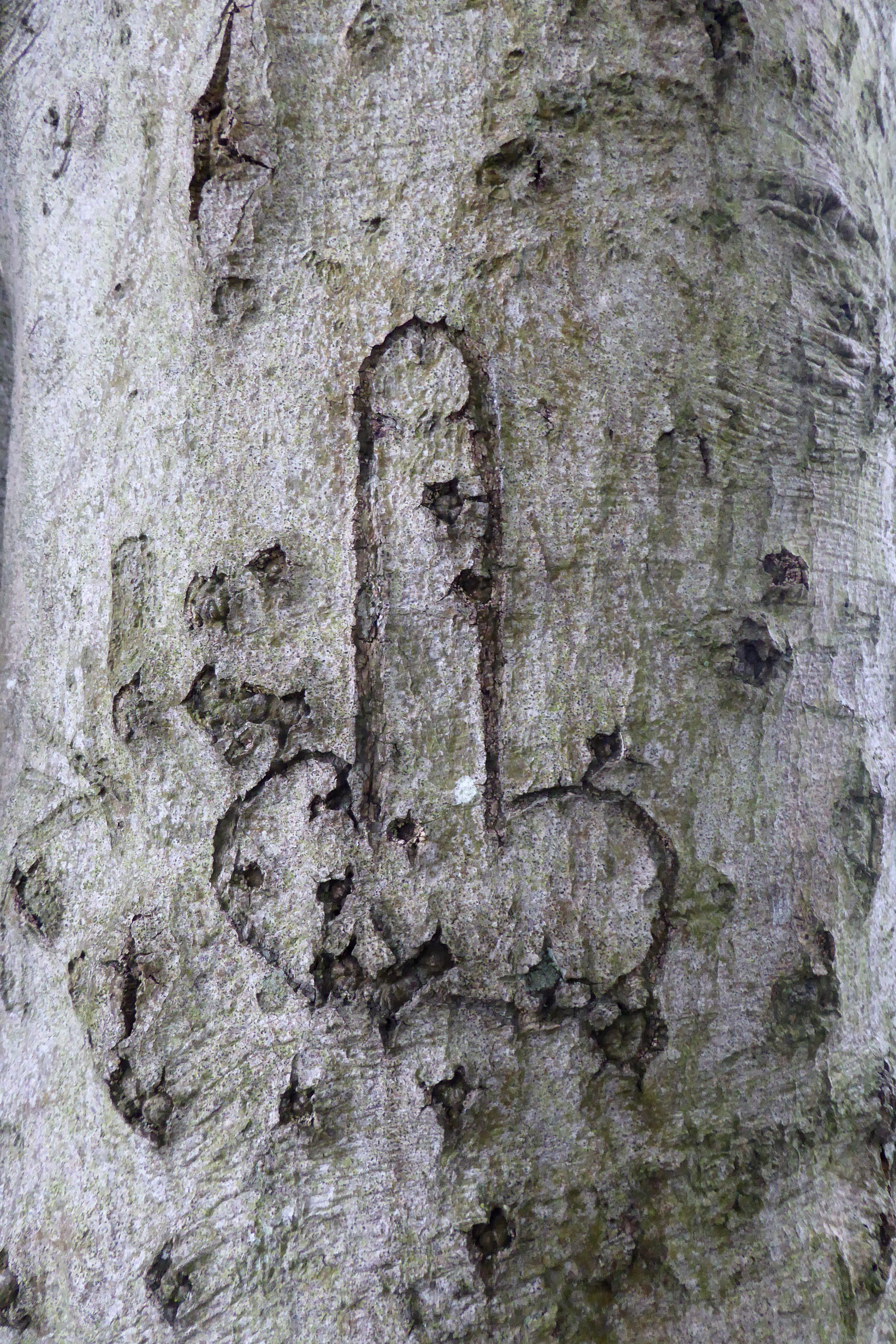
A phallic arborglyph on a beech at the site of Old Sarum in Wiltshire, England

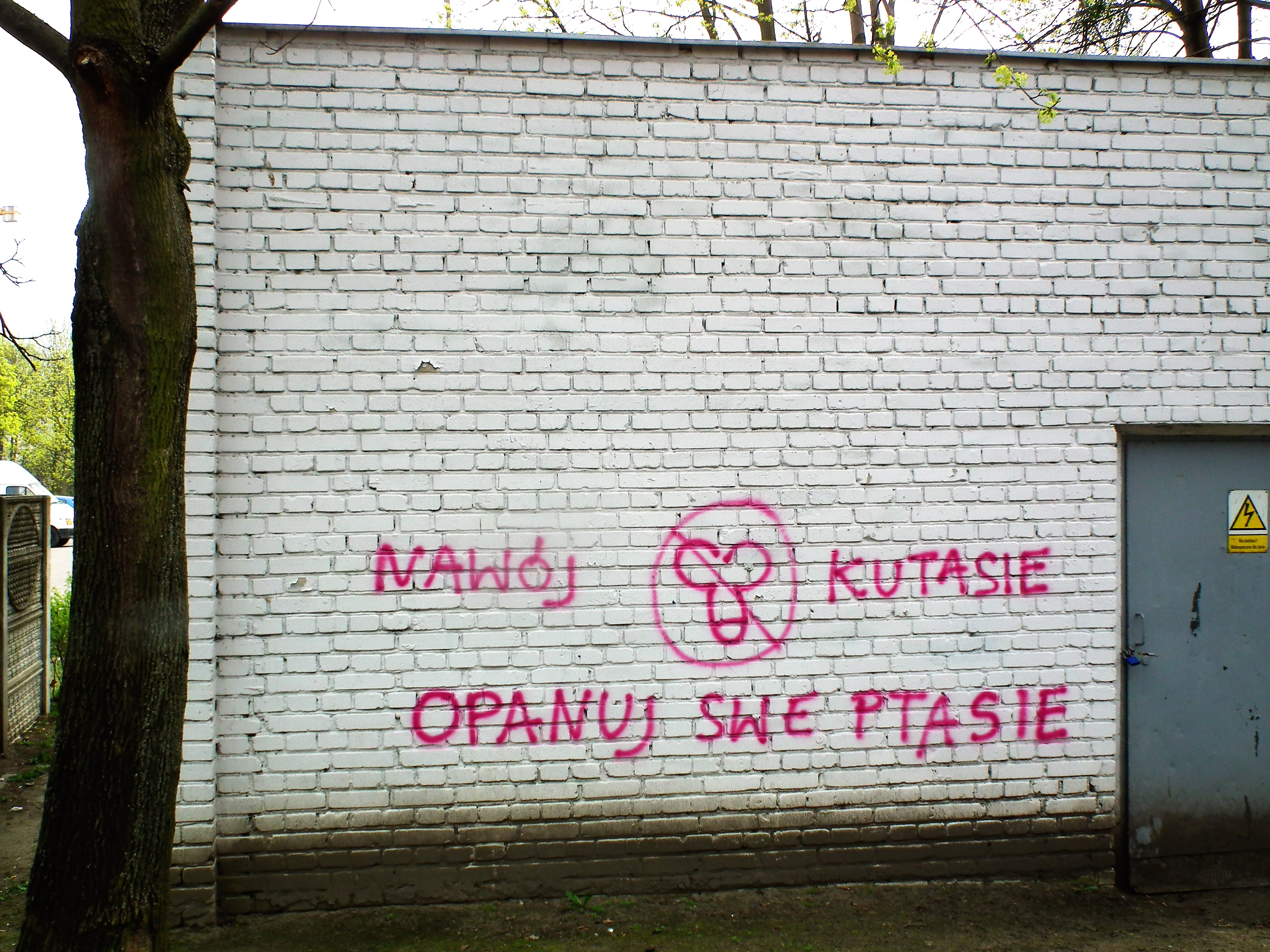
Anti-phallic graffito, reading Nawój kutasie opanuj swe ptasie, sprayed onto a wall in Poznań, Poland

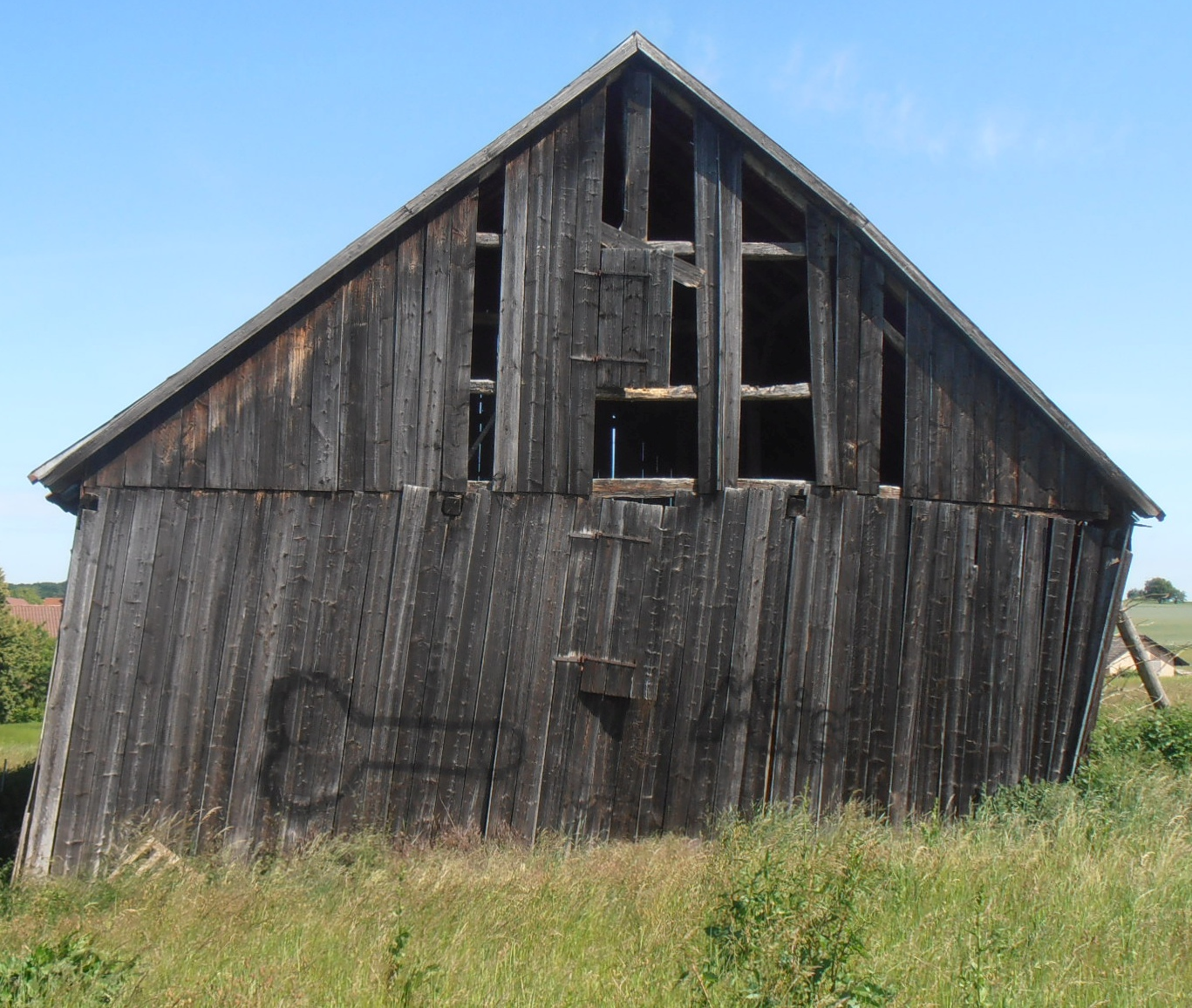
A phallus spray-painted onto a timber framed barn in Heilbronn, Germany, 2015

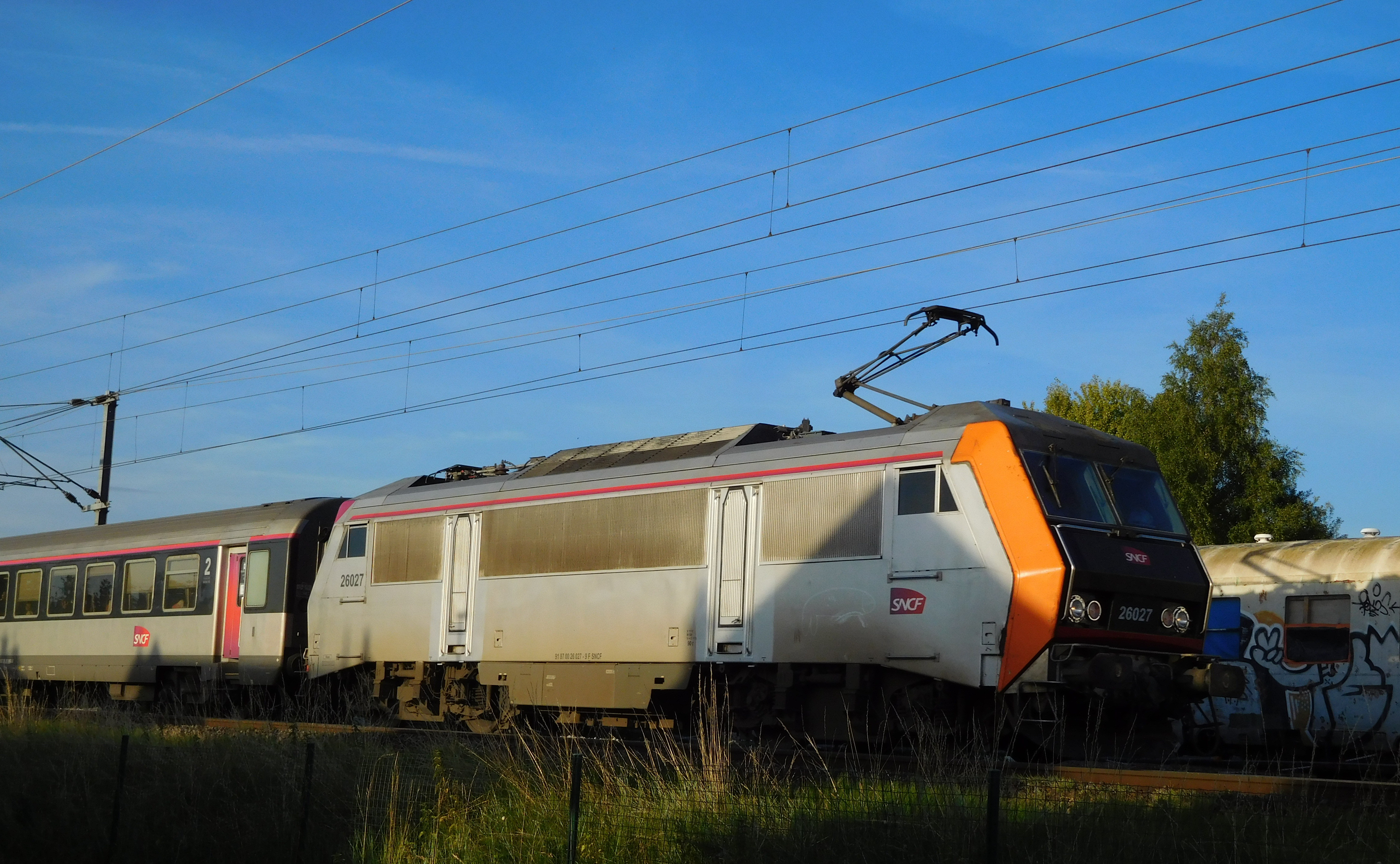
An SNCF Class BB 26000 adorned with a penis drawn into the dust on its cab in Nièvre, France, 2017

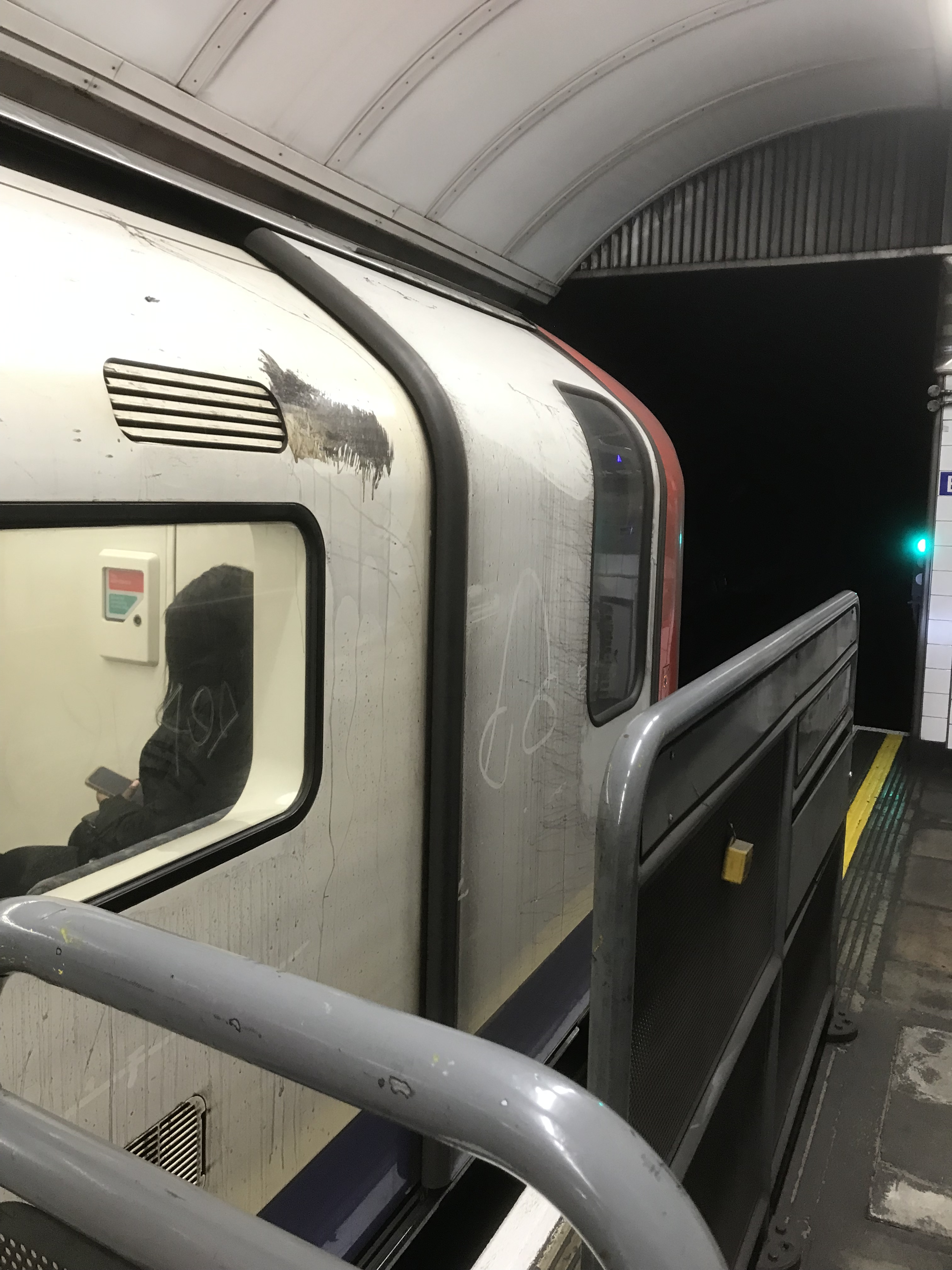
A London Underground 2009 Stock, with phallic graffito on its cab, stands at Oxford Circus, 2025

The Penis Mafia on a residence in Schöneberg, Germany, 2023

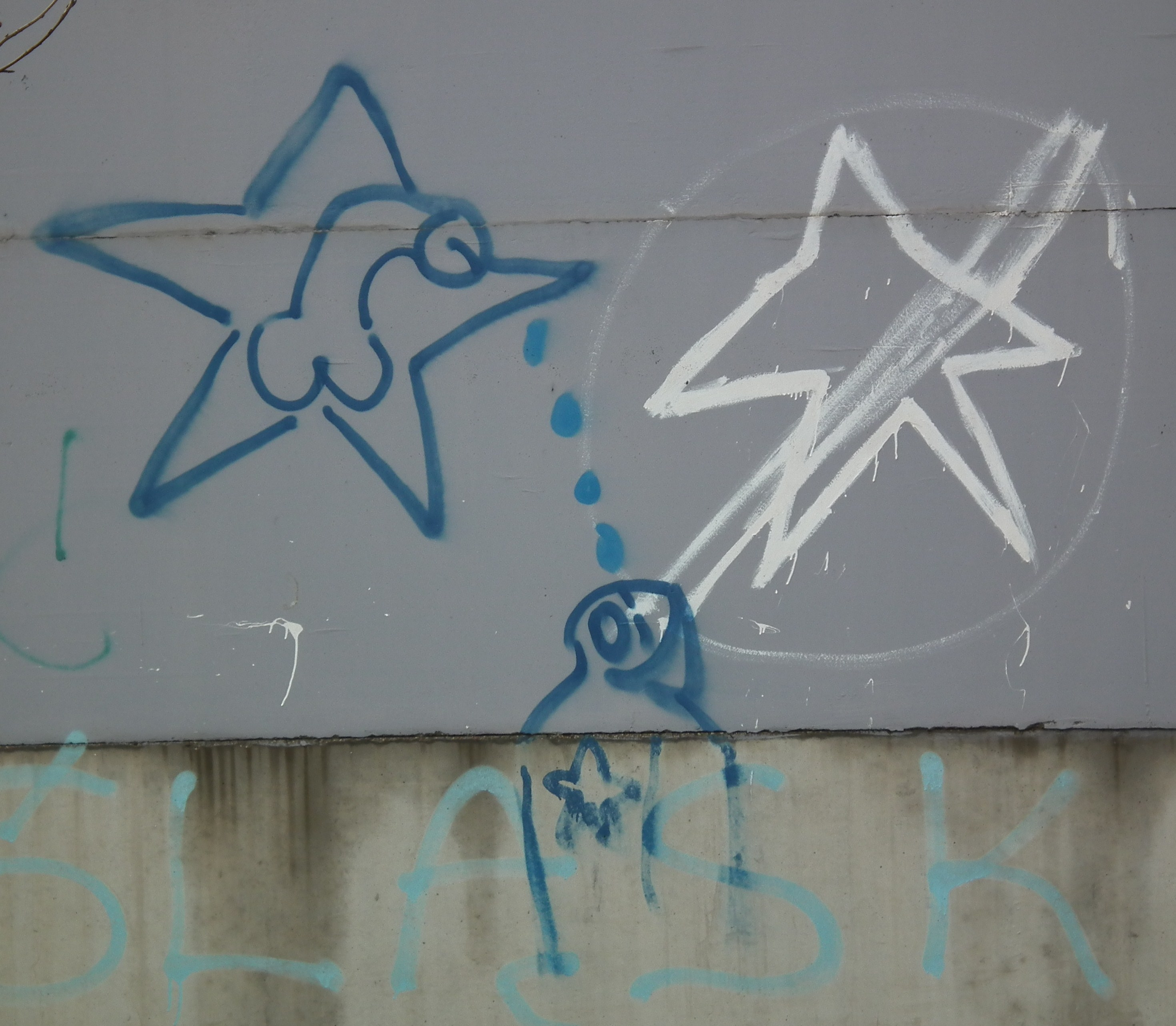
Derogatory graffito, using a phallus, aimed at fans of Wisła Kraków. Pictured in Poznań, Poland, 2016

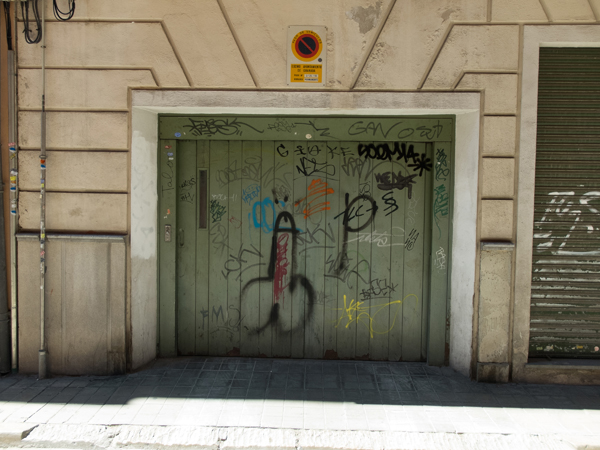
Cock and balls graffito on a garage door in Granada, Spain, 2015

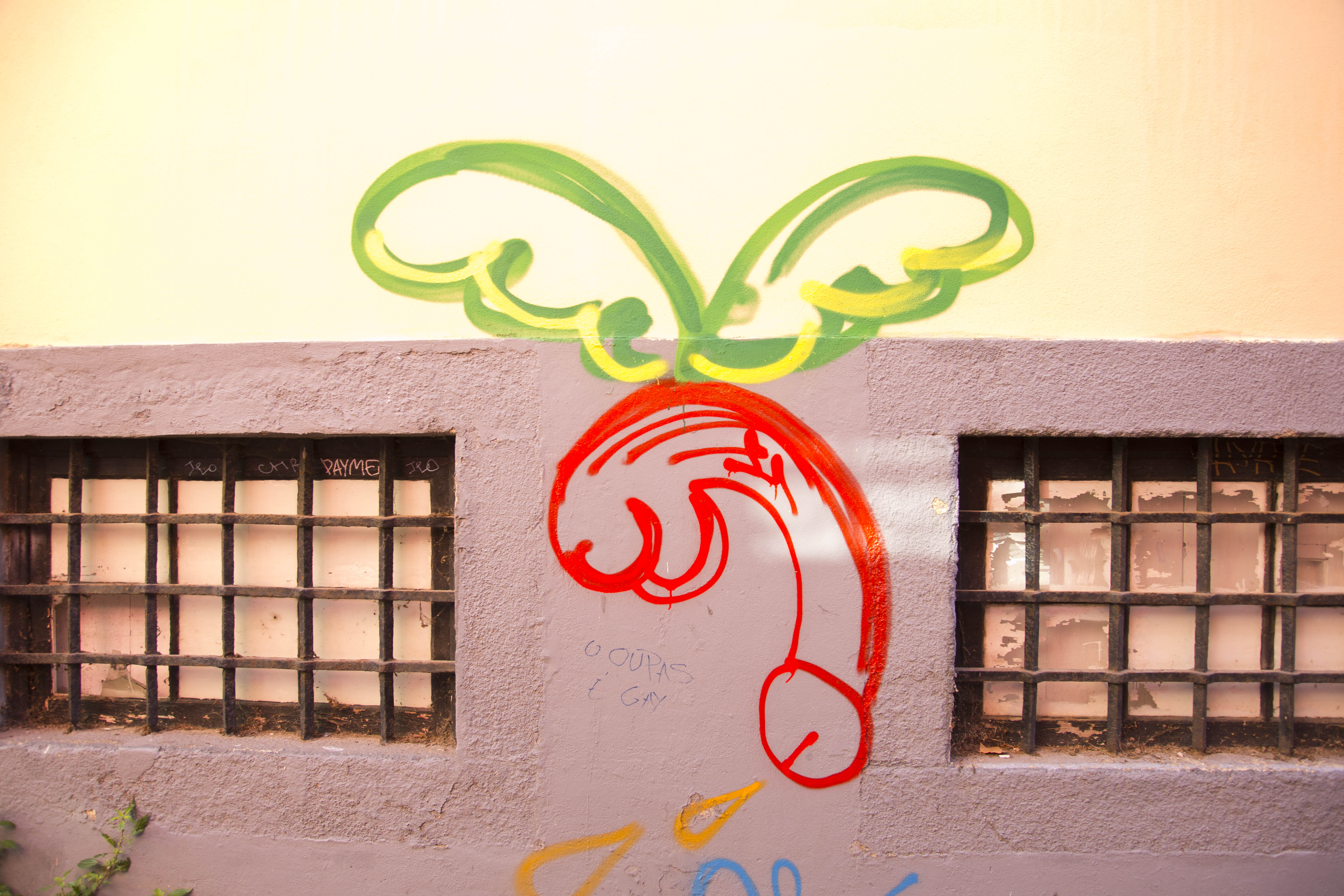
Winged phallus graffito on a wall in Porto, Portugal, 2017

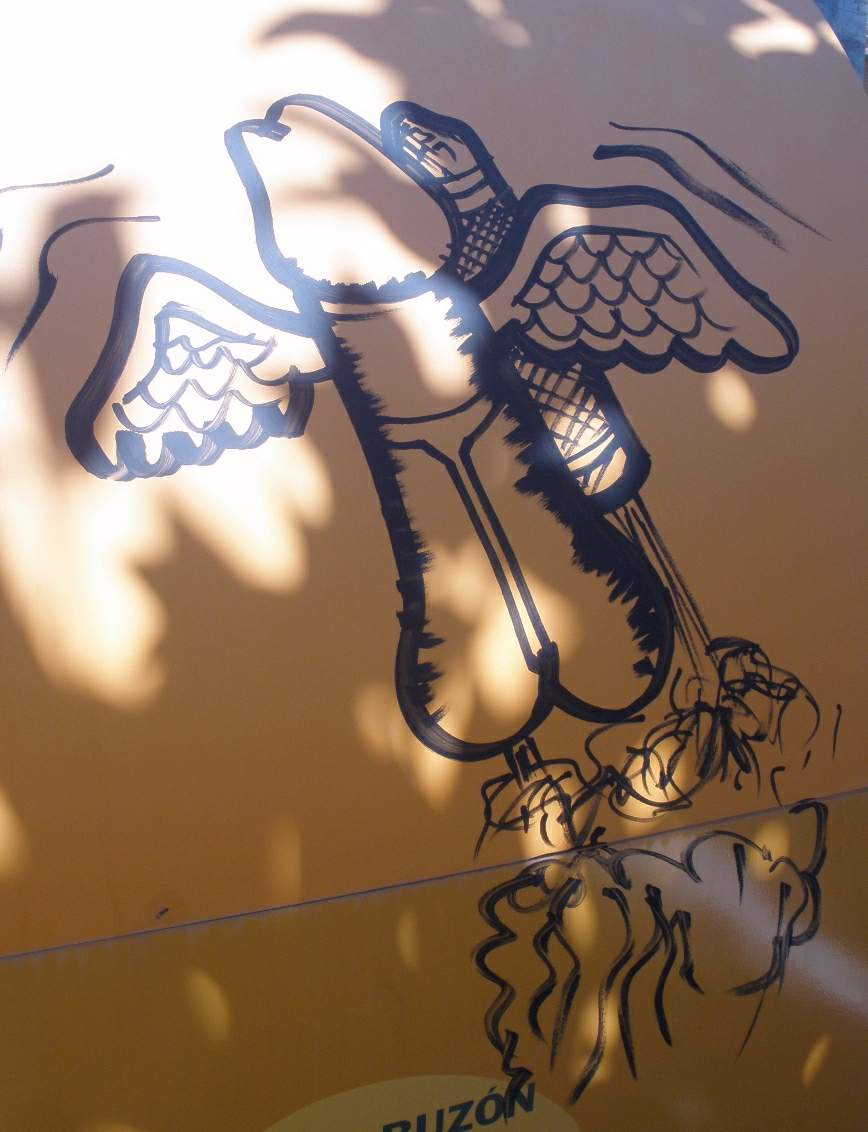
Winged phallus graffito in Logroño, Spain, 2012

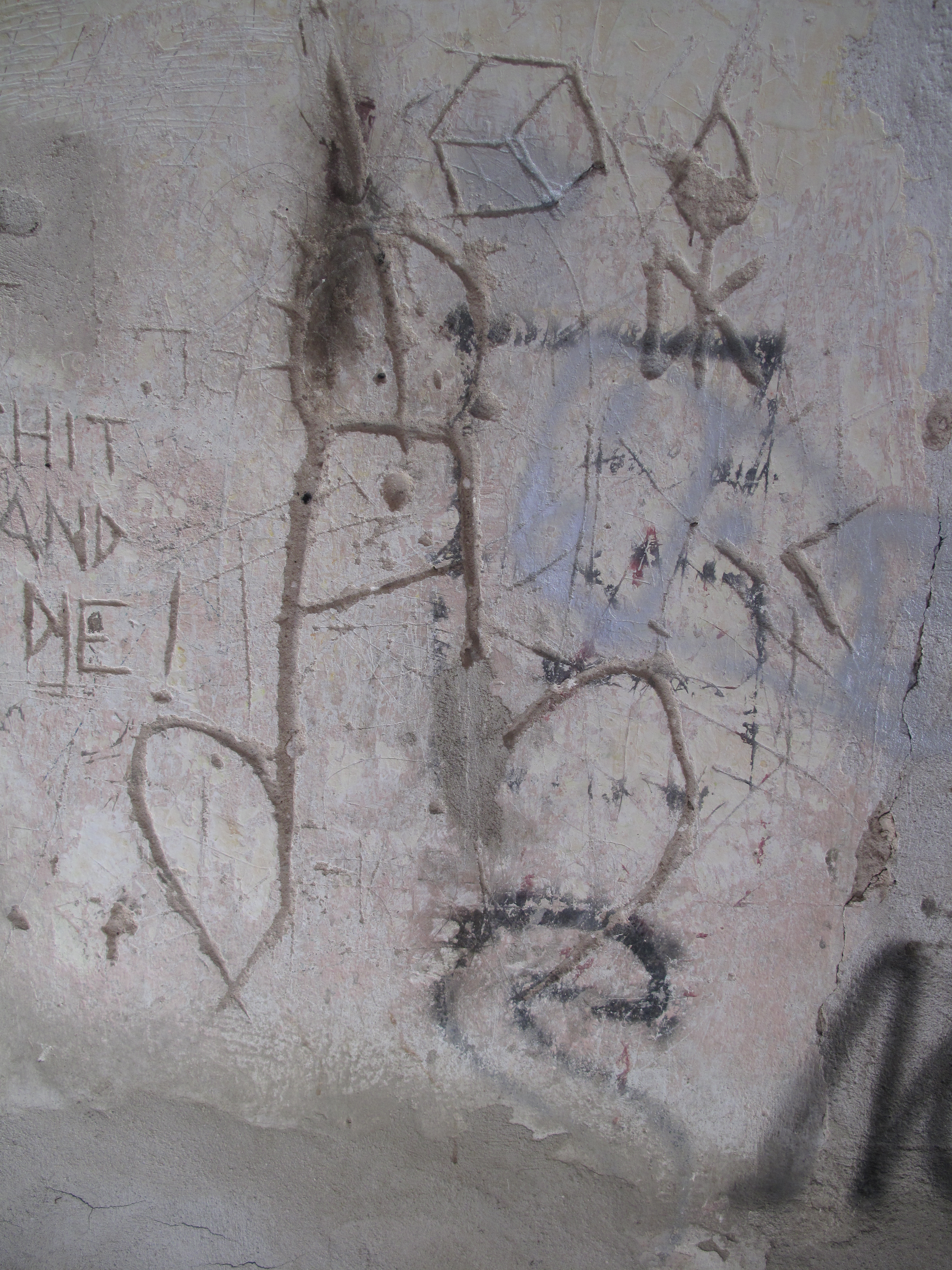
Phallus inscribed into the wall of Klučov railway station, Czech Republic, 2010

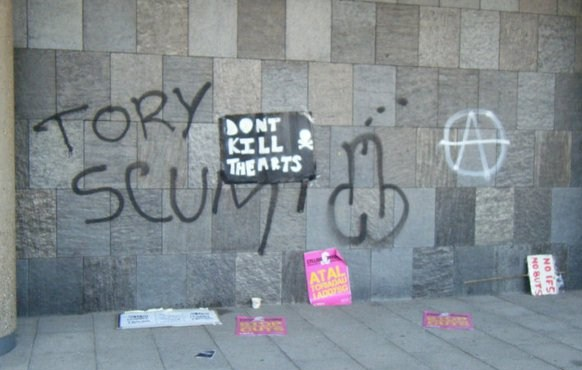
A protest penis sprayed onto the Millbank Tower during the 2010 student protest in London

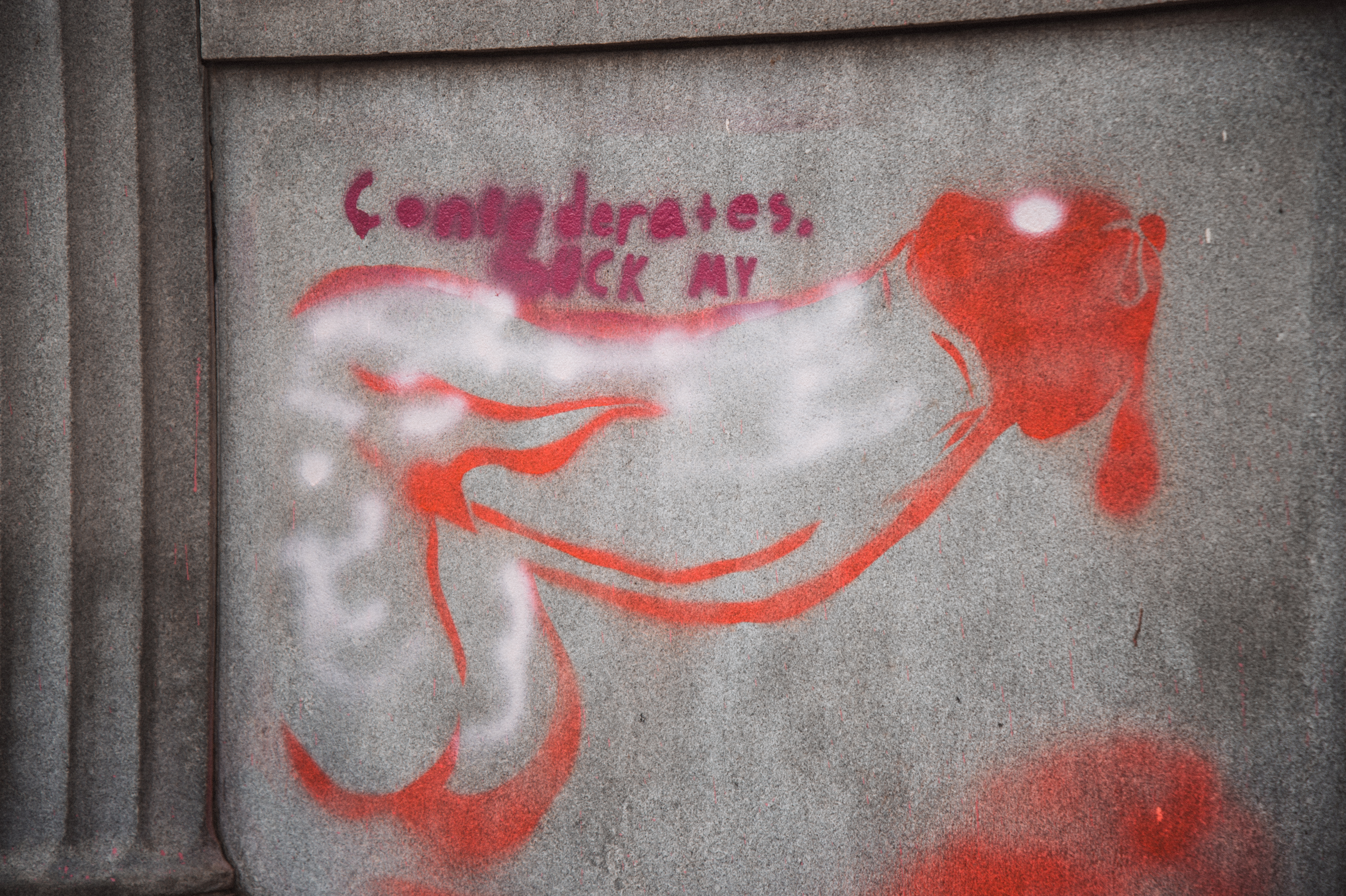
Phallic graffito reading ‘Confederates suck my dick’, stencilled onto the Jefferson Davis Memorial, Monument Avenue, during the George Floyd protests in Richmond, Virginia in 2020.

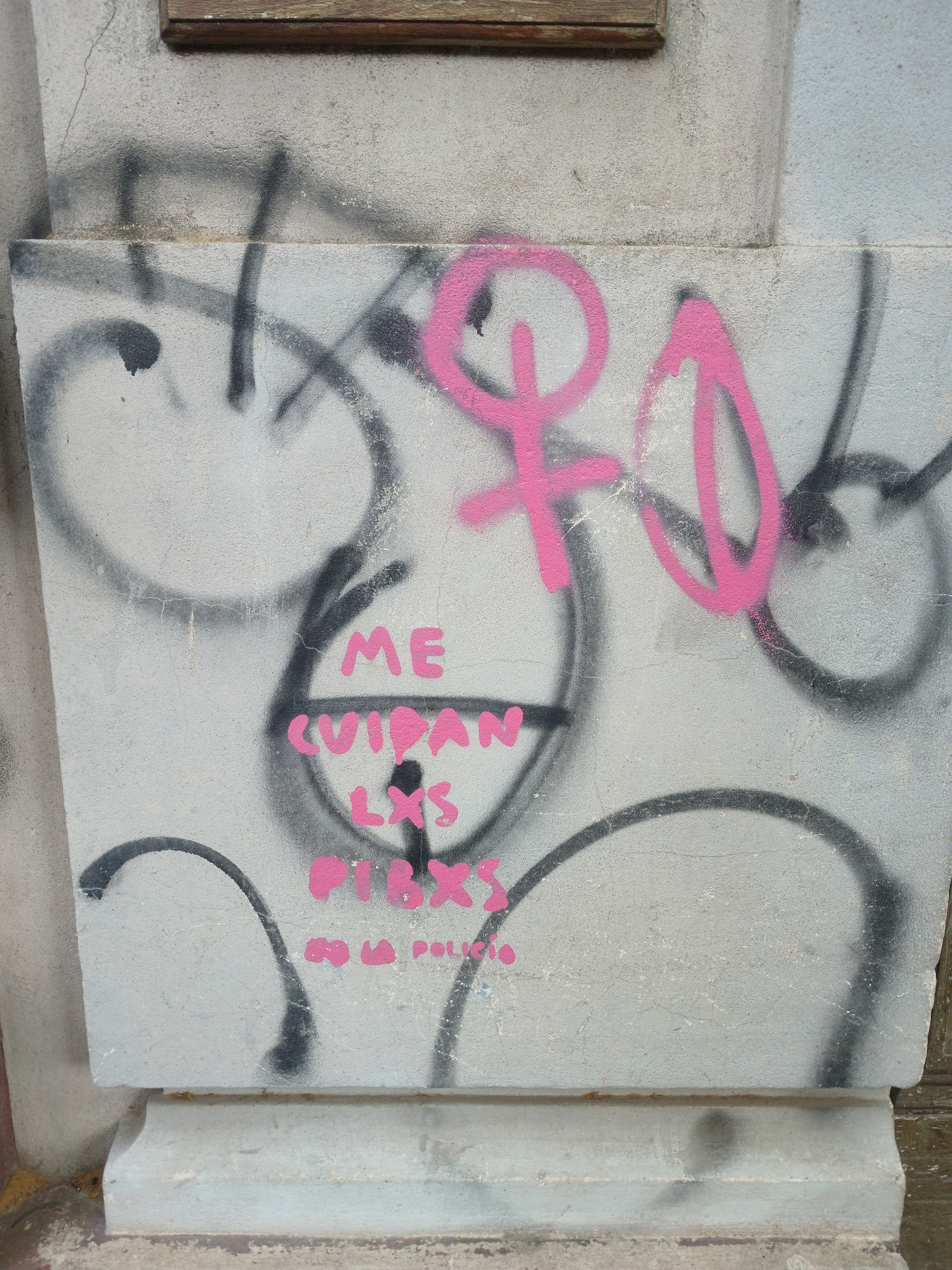
Phallic graffito in Montevideo, Uruguay. It is overwritten with the text Me cuidan lxs pibxs no la policía (transl. The [neutral gender] guys protect me not the police)

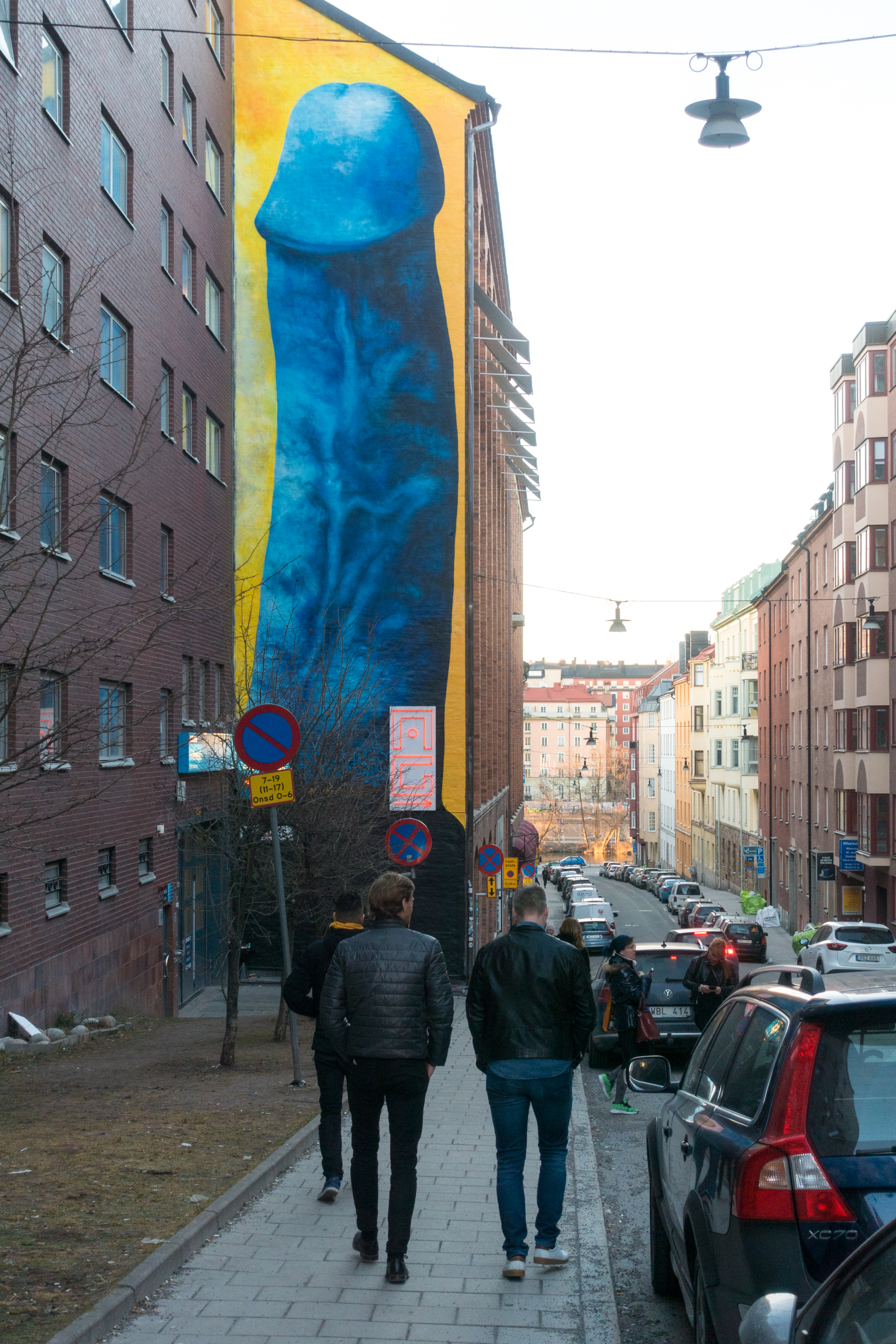
A large street art phallus by Carolina Falkholt in Stockholm, 2018

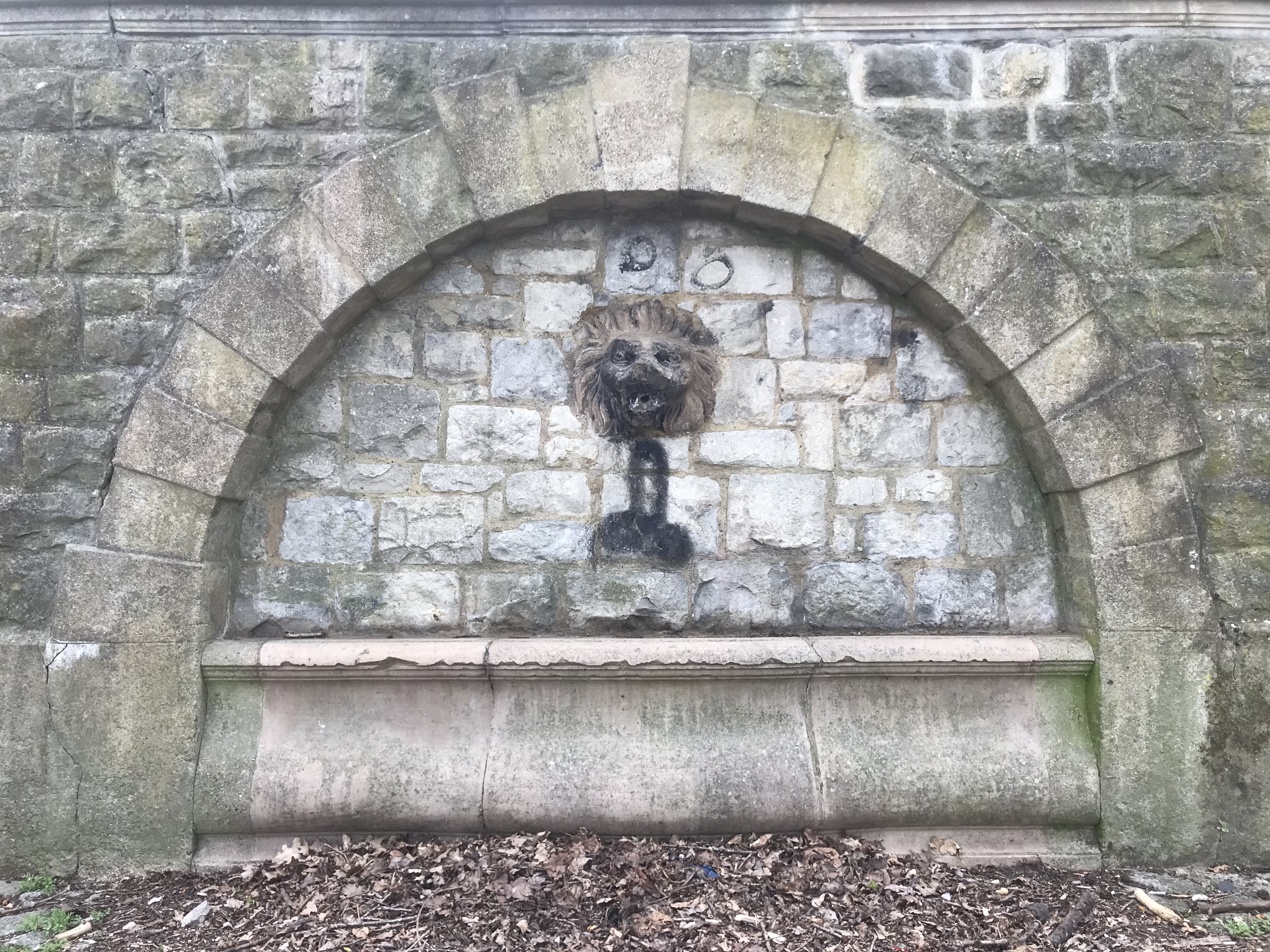
Phallic graffito under a relief of a lion, Kingswood Estate, 2025

== See also ==
- Phallic architecture
- Phallus paintings in Bhutan
