= Light art =

Visual art using light as a medium

The Light Inside by James Turrell

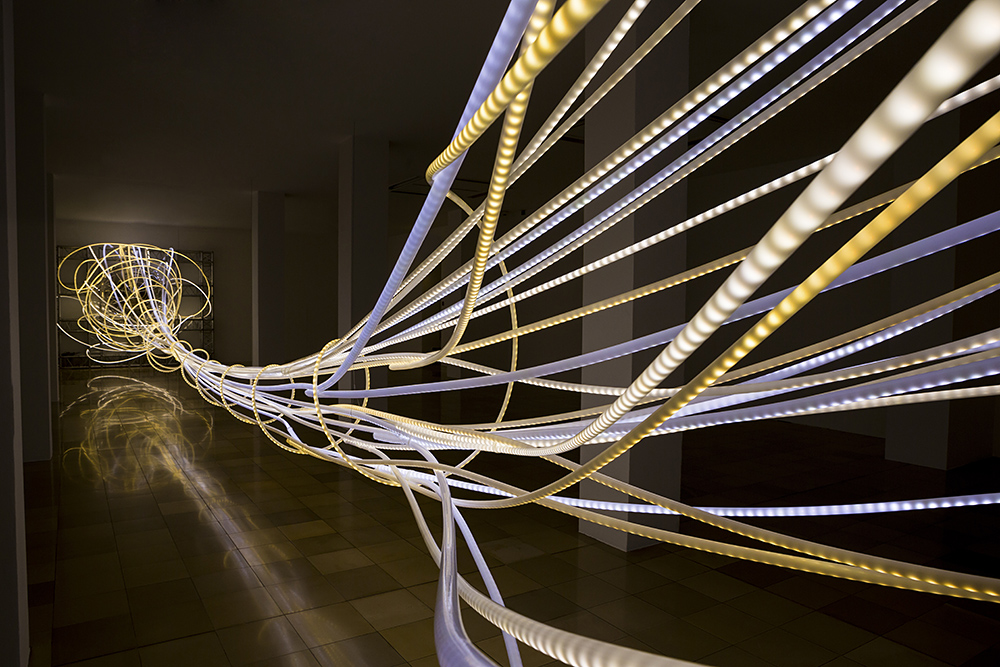
Ocupante by Grimanesa Amorós

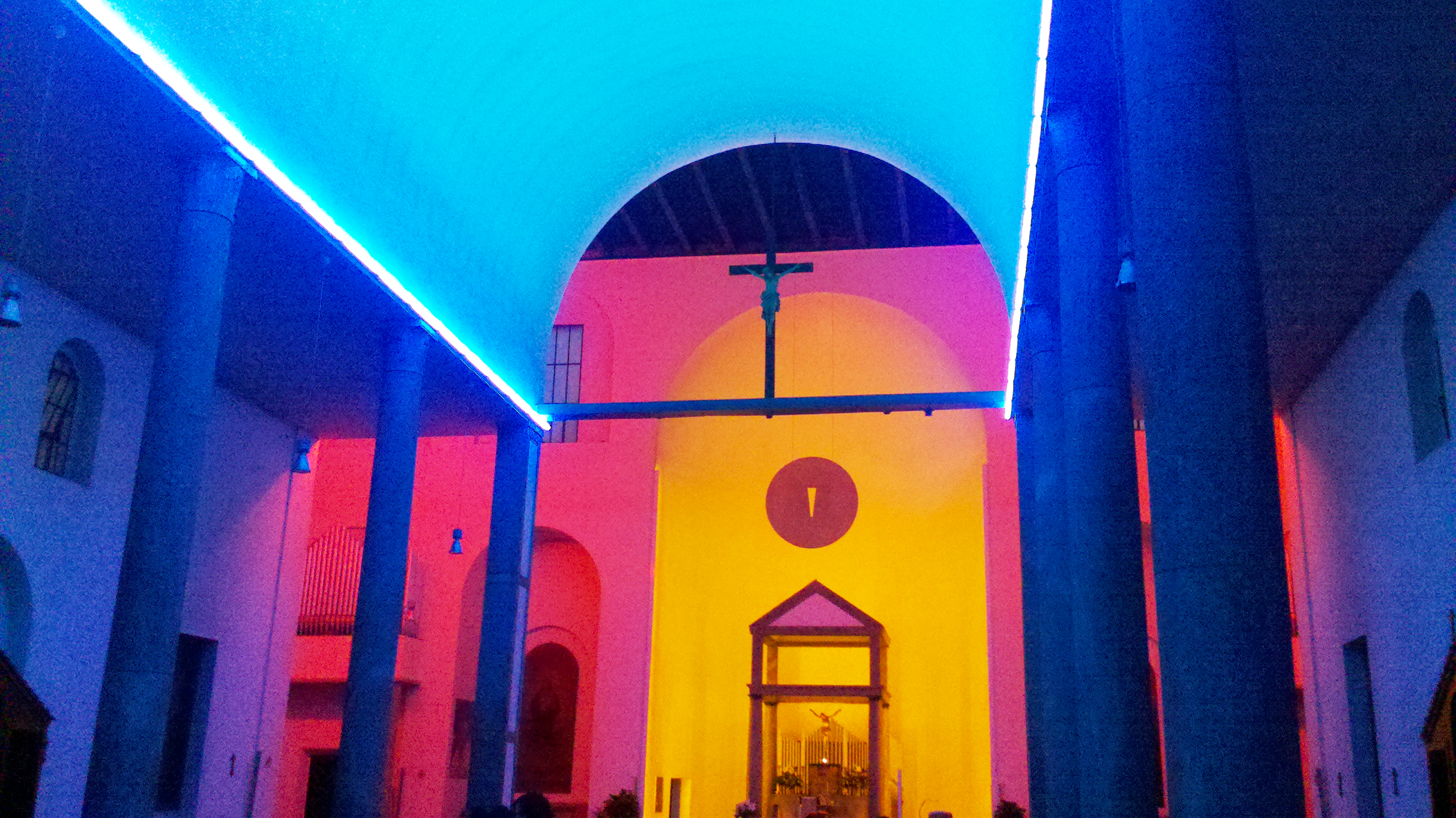
Interior of Santa Maria Annunciata in Chiesa Rossa light installation by Dan Flavin

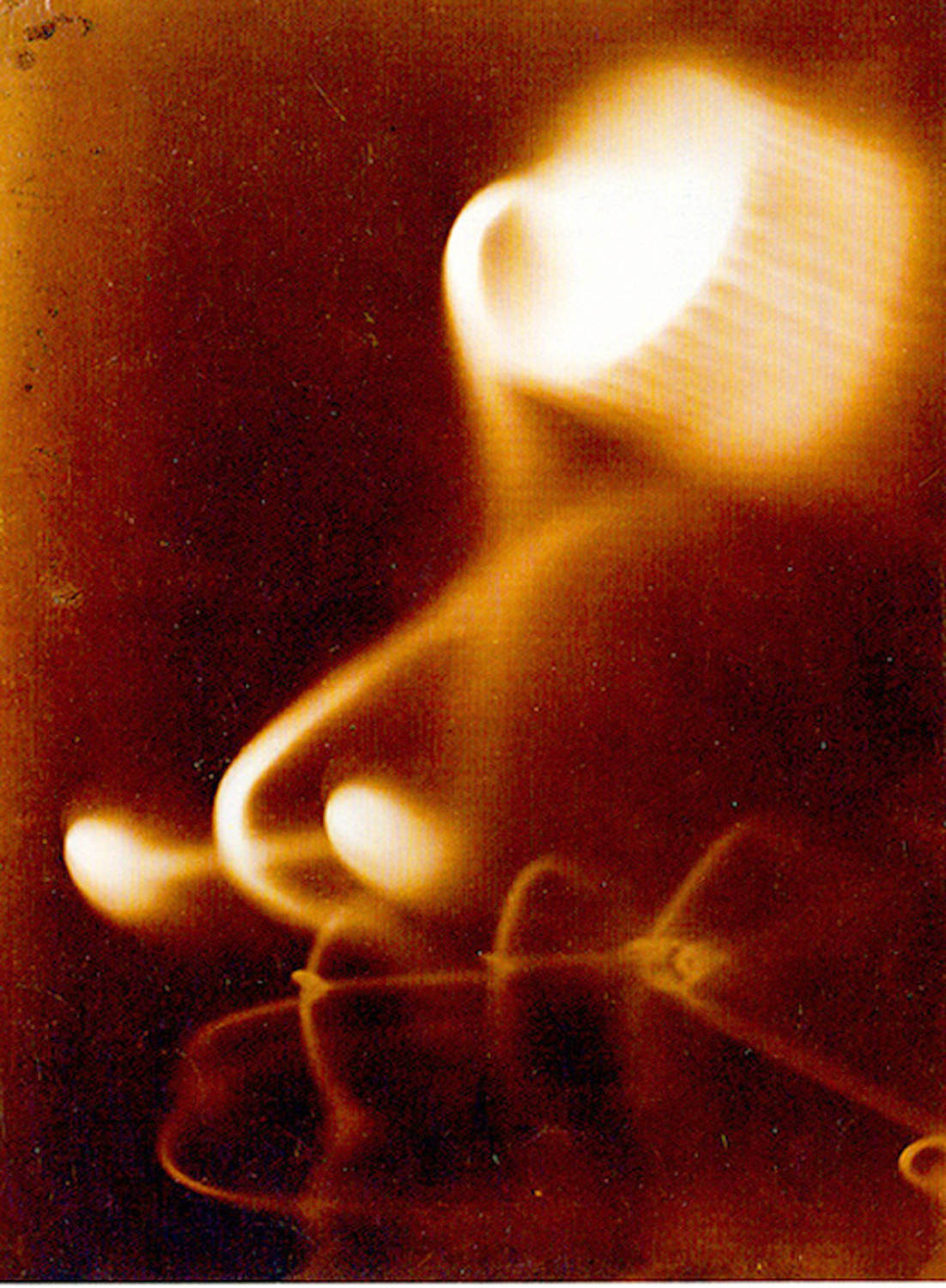
Photogram by László Moholy-Nagy, 1923

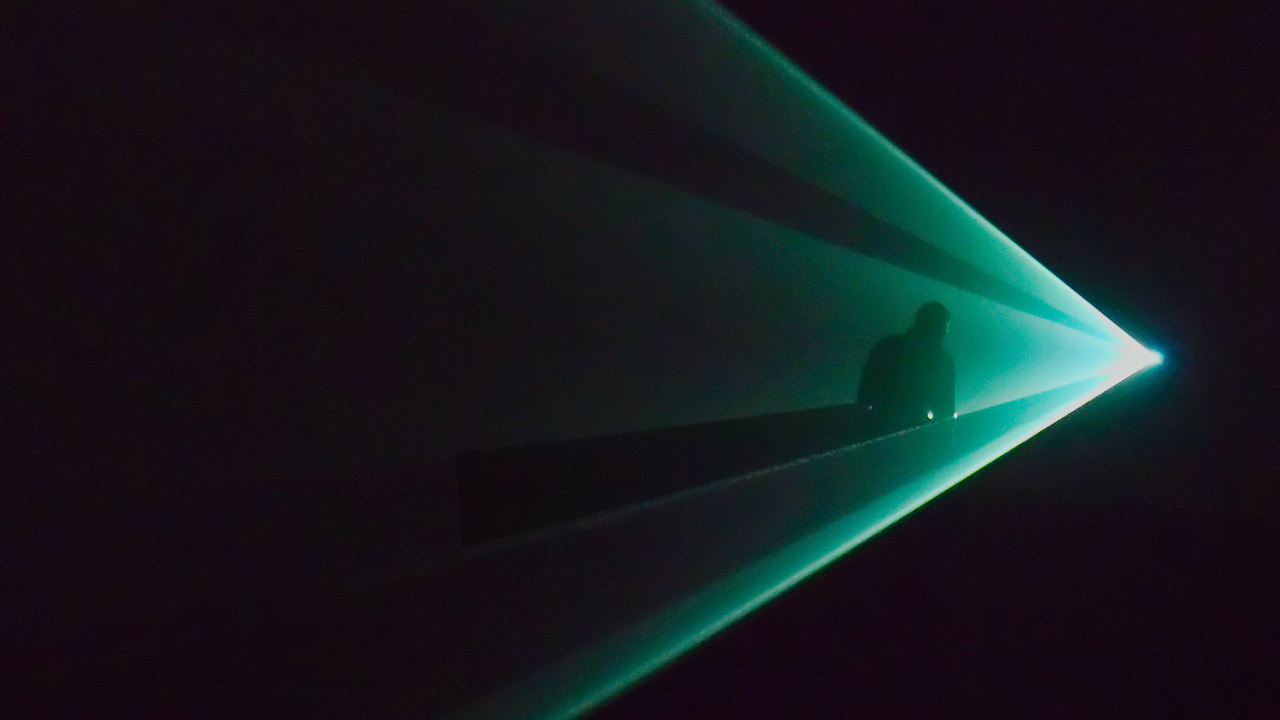
Solid Light Works by Anthony McCall

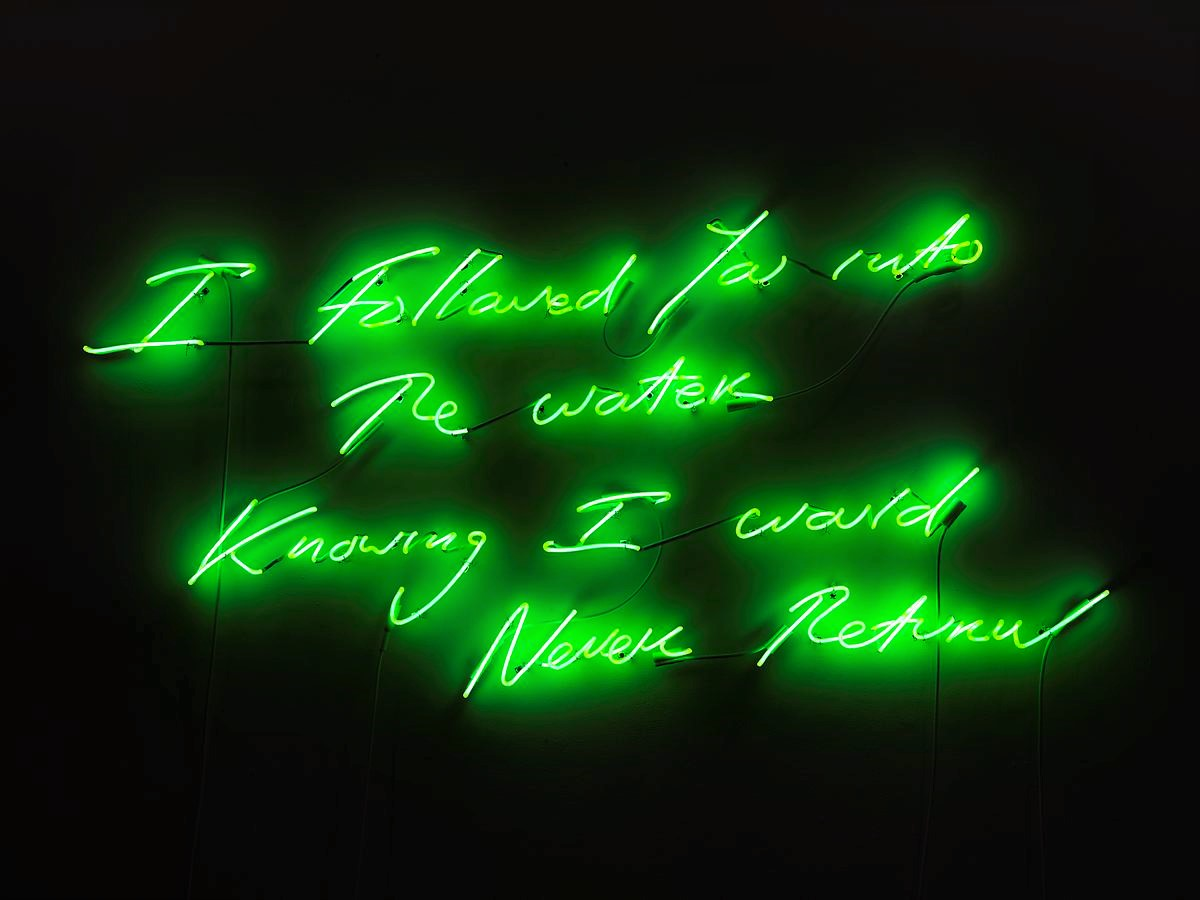
"I followed you into the water knowing I would never return" by Tracey Emin

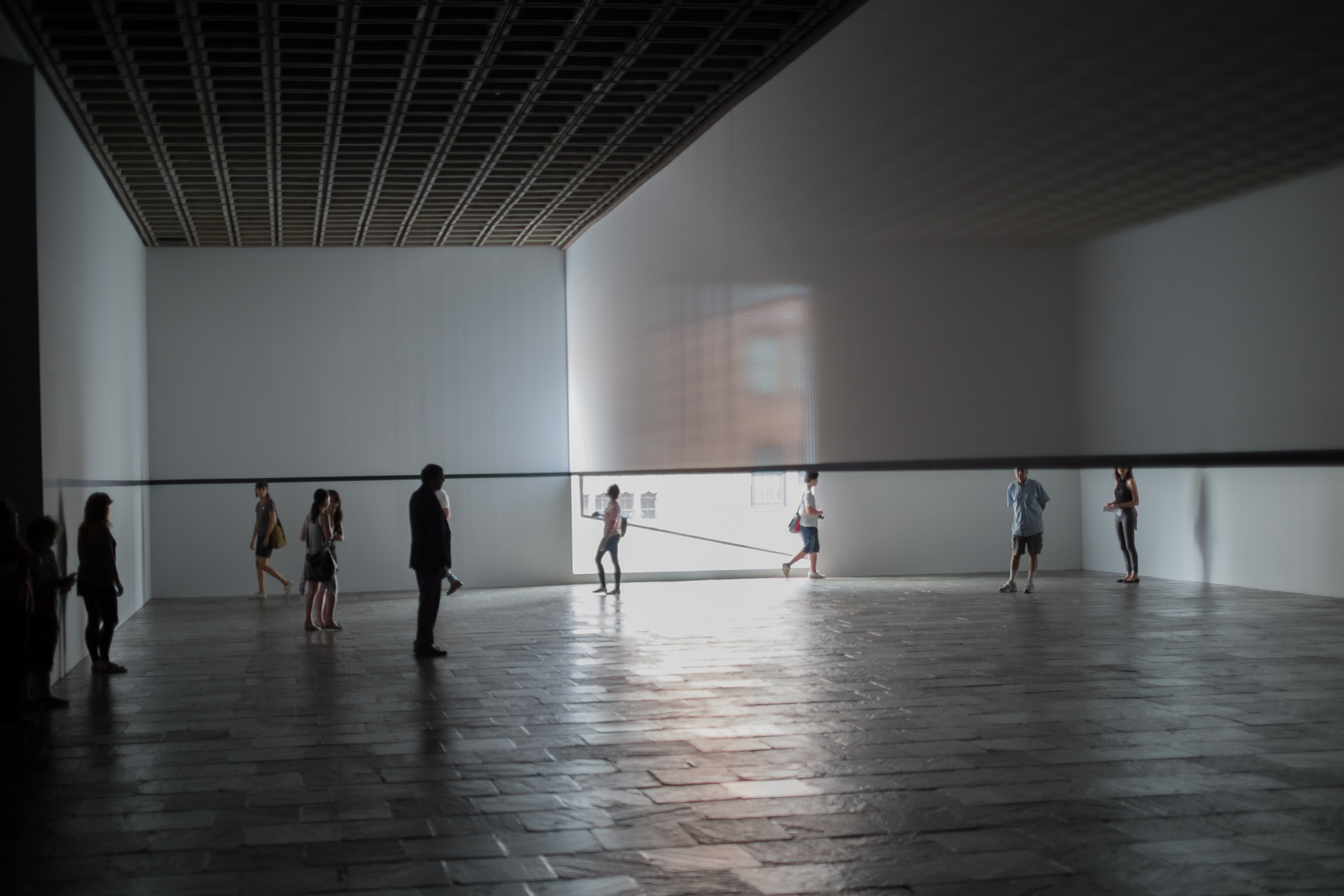
Scrim Veil—Black Rectangle—Natural Light by Robert Irwin

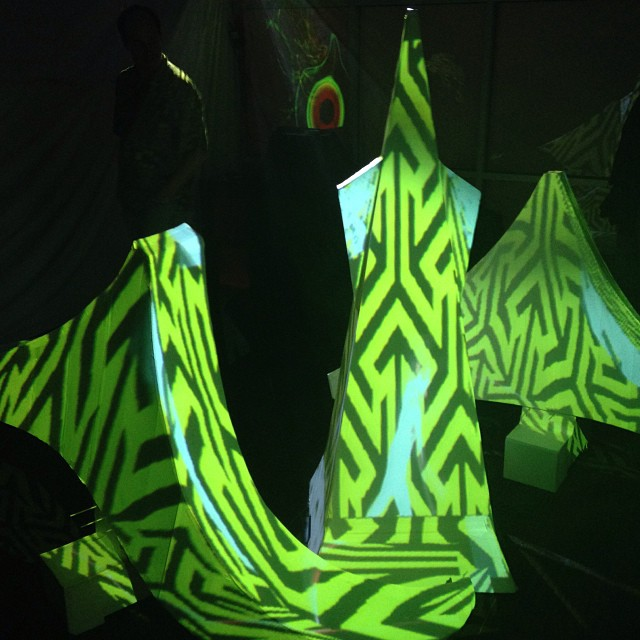
Projection mapping (San Francisco)

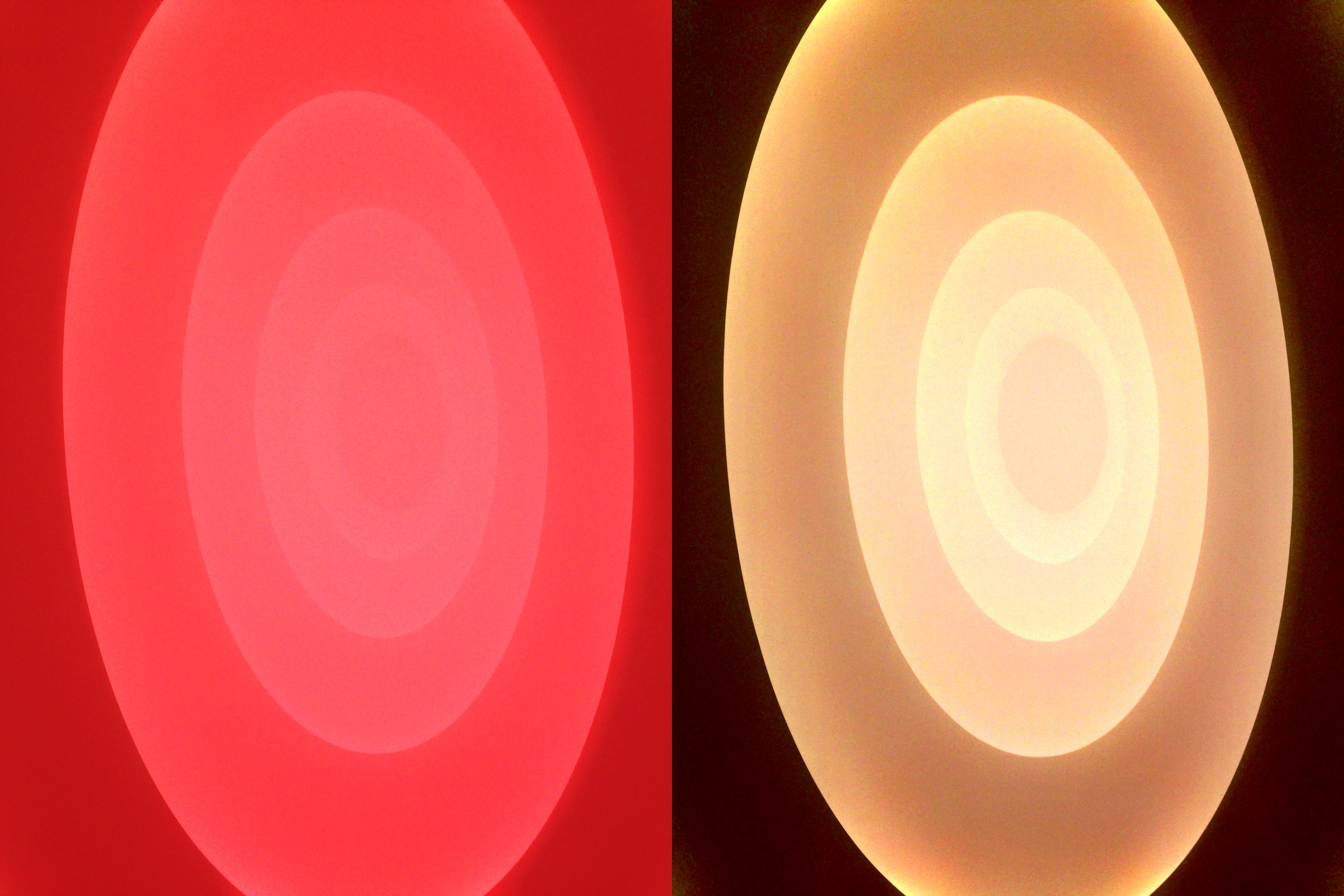
Two separate shots side-by-side looking up toward the ceiling in the middle of the Guggenheim Museum in New York during James Turrell's light exhibition Aten Reign.

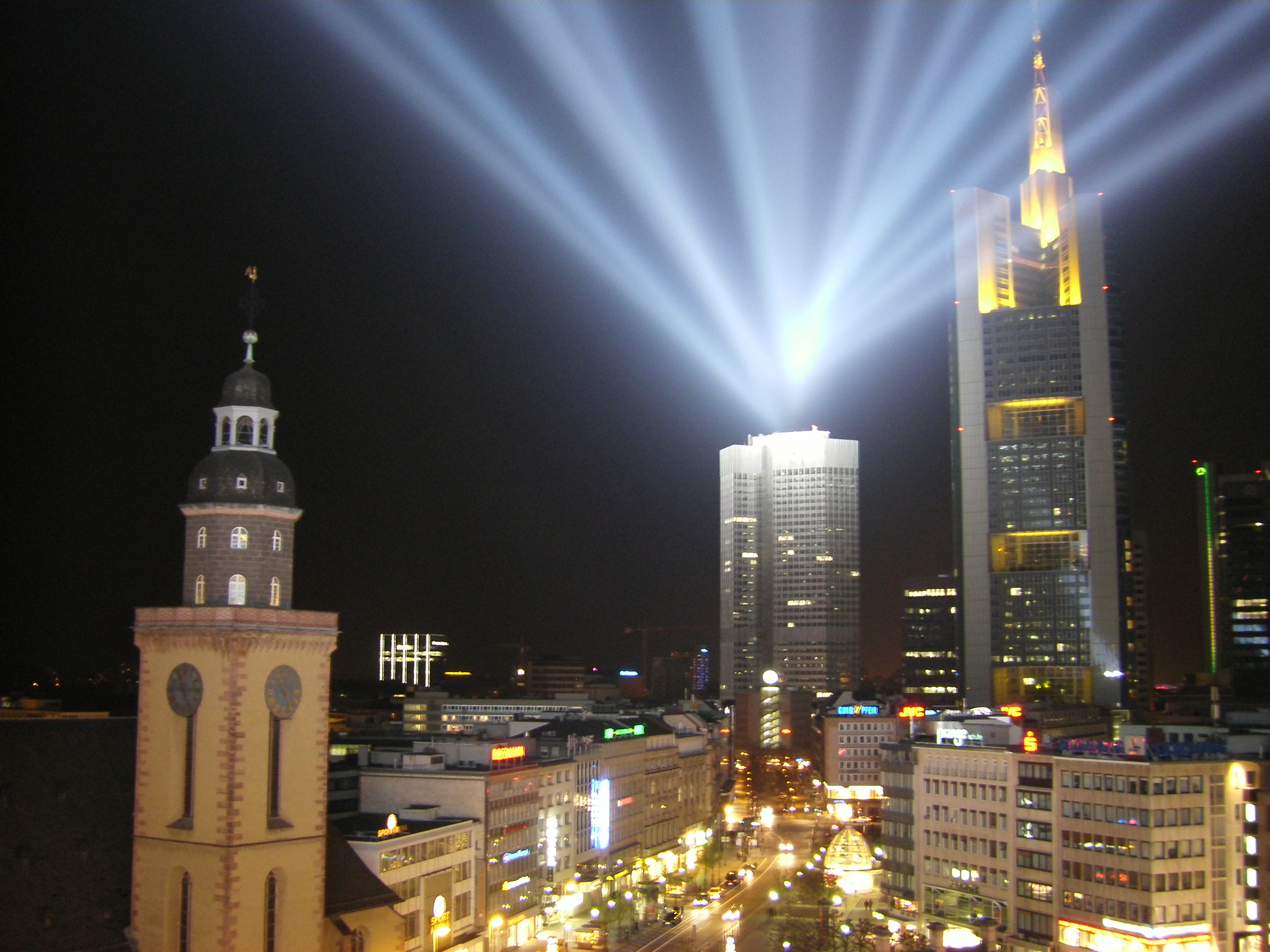
Light installation of the Luminale 2008 during the trade fair Light + Building in Frankfurt, Germany

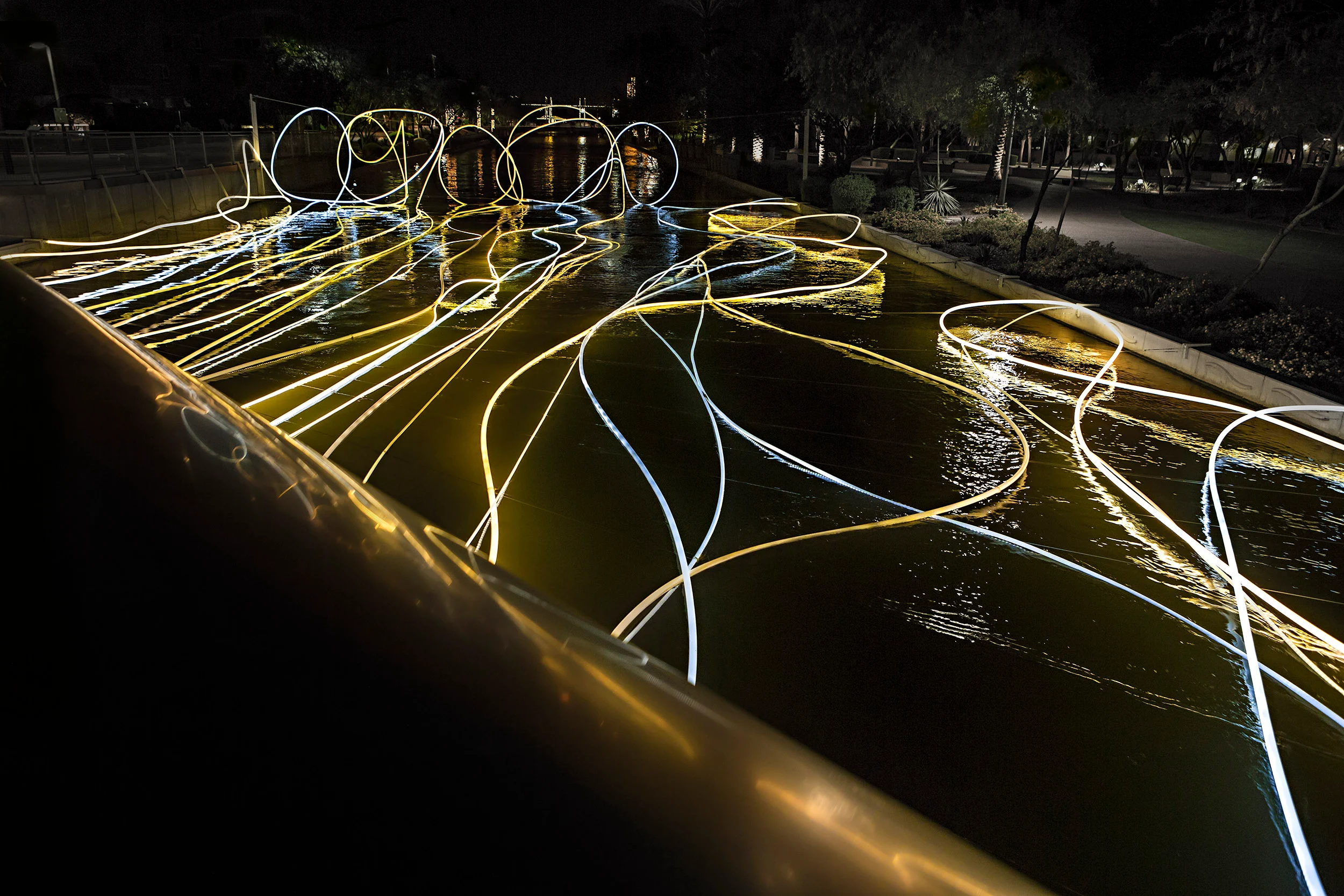
Golden Waters light installation by Grimanesa Amorós

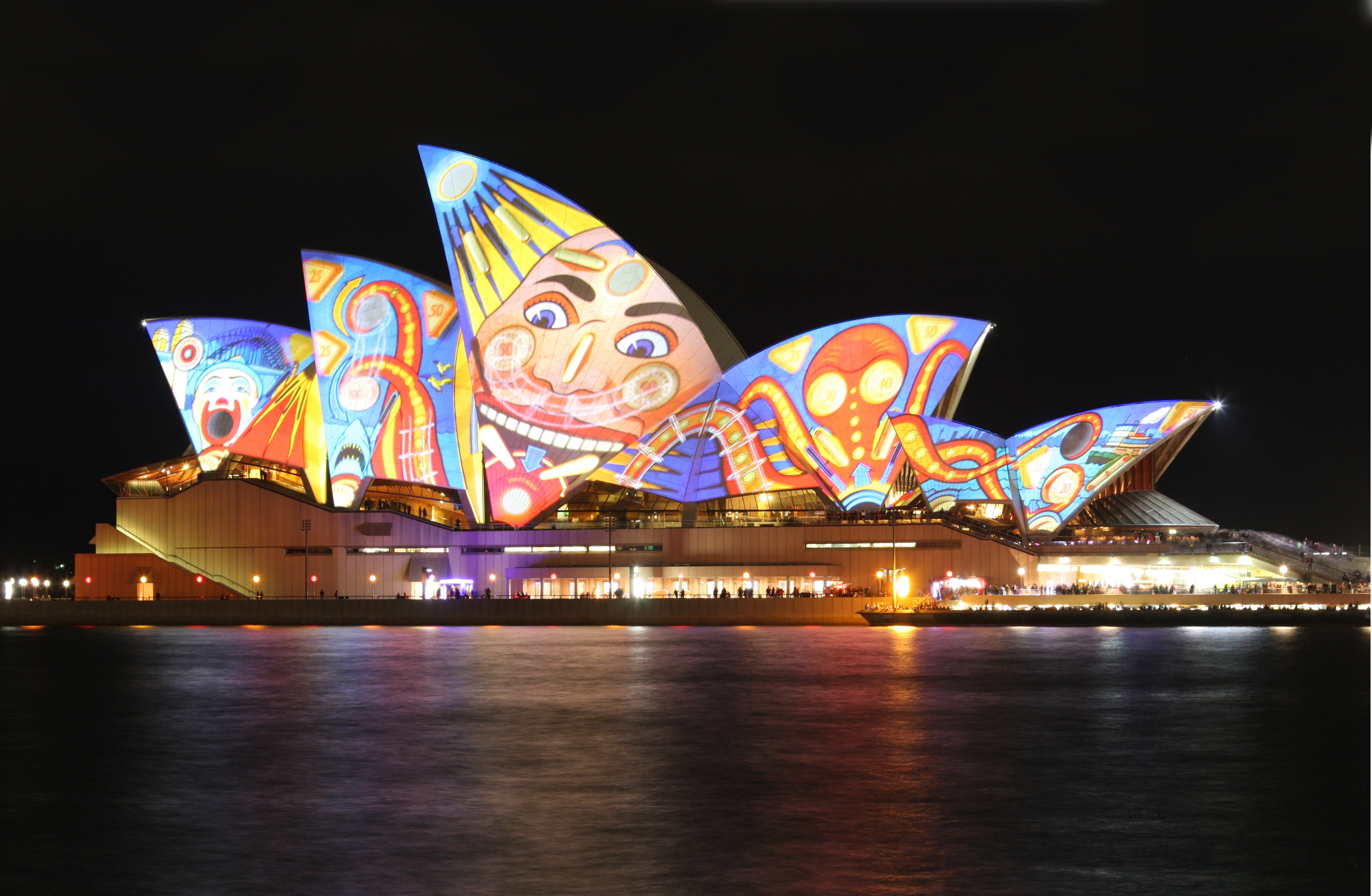
The Sydney Opera House during Vivid Sydney (2013).

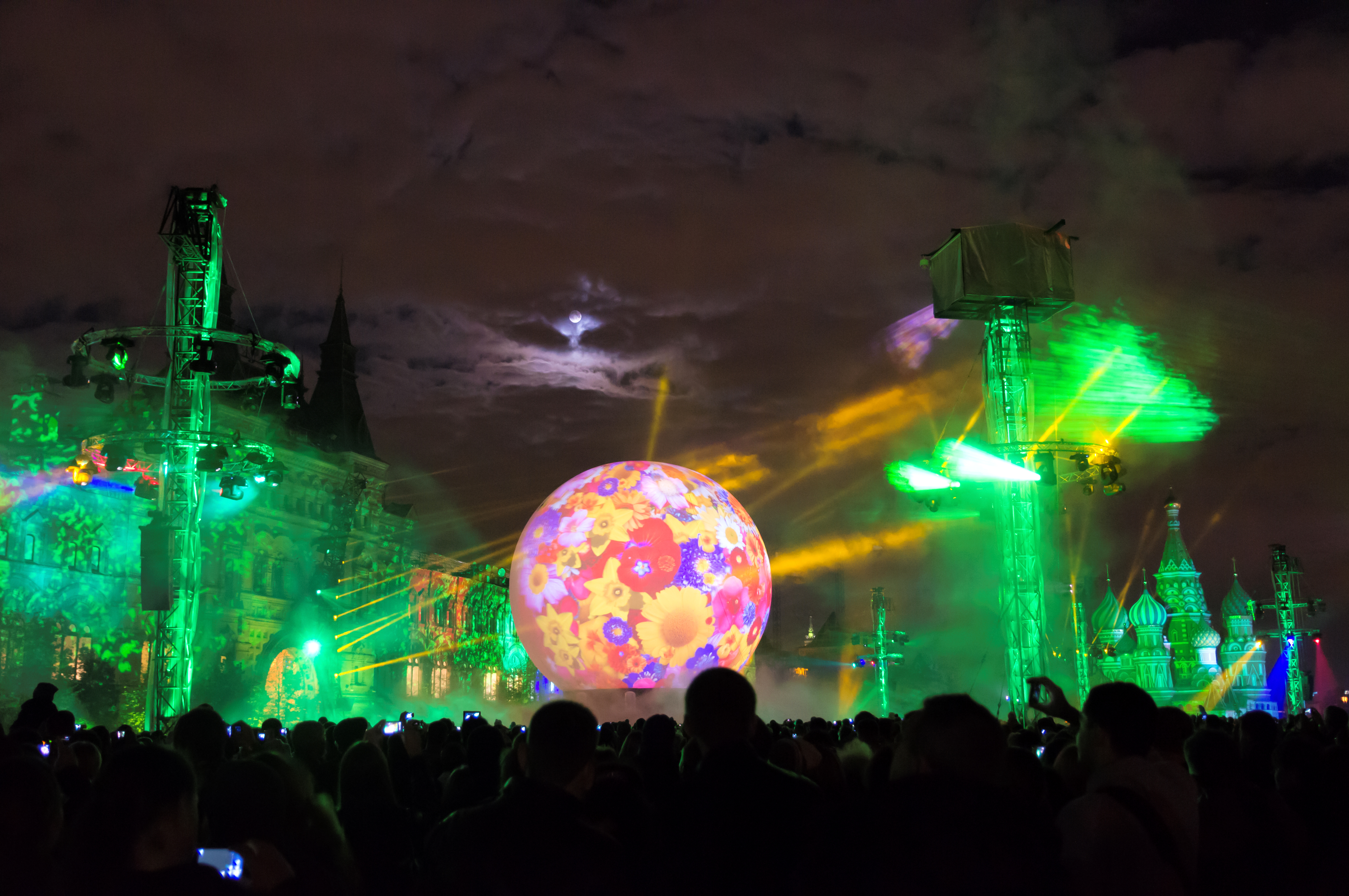
Light art festival in Moscow, Russia

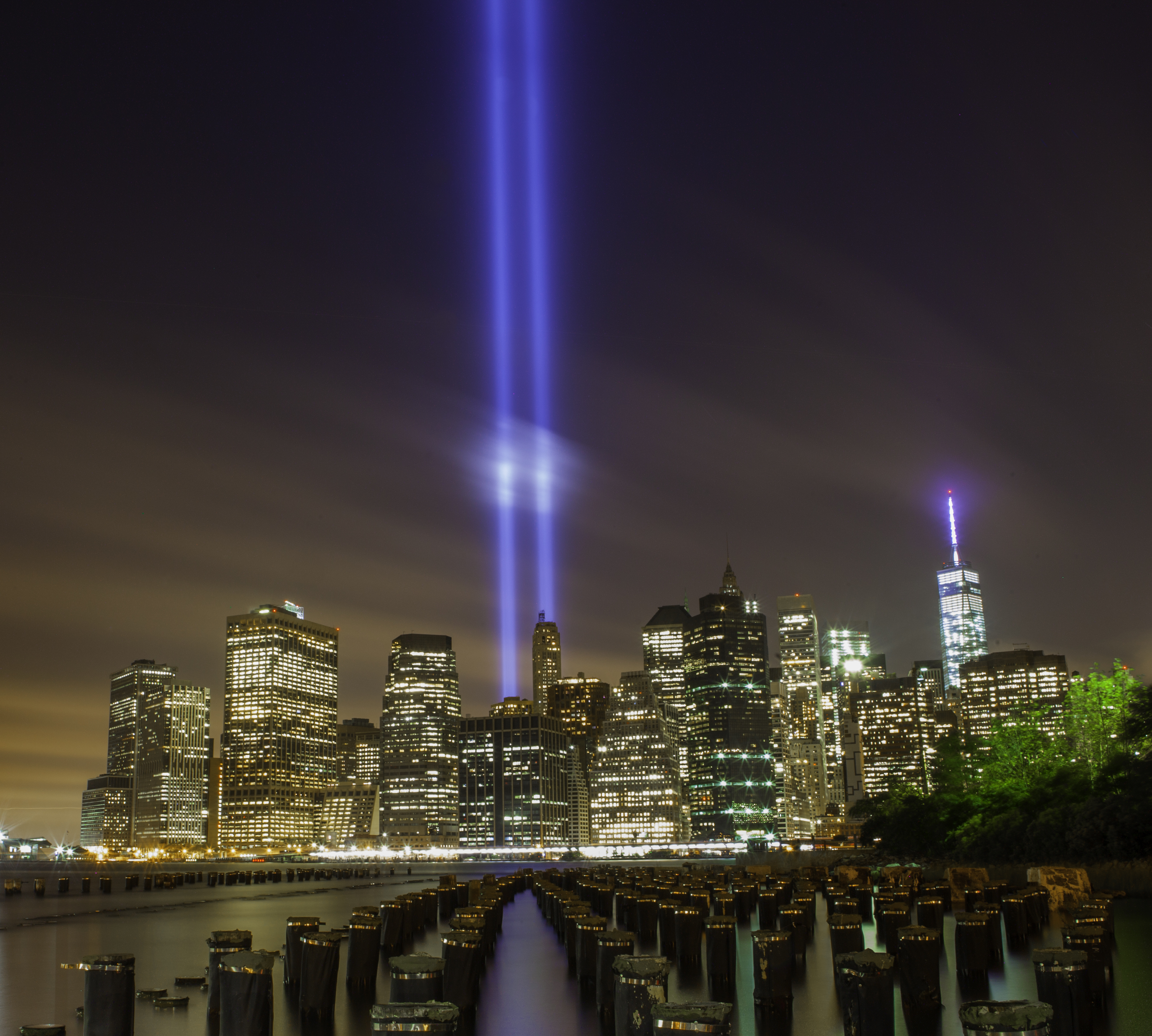
Tribute In Light, commemorating the September 11 destruction of the Twin Towers

Light art, or the art of light, generally refers to a form of visual art in which light is the main, if not the sole, medium of creation. Definitions of the term vary considerably. Since light is the medium for visual perception, this way all visual art could be considered light art absurdly enough; but most pieces of art are valid and coherent without reflecting on this basic perceptual fact. Some approaches on these grounds also include into light art those forms of art where light is not any medium contributing to the artwork, but is depicted. Thus, luminism may also refer to light art in the above sense, its previous usage point to painterly styles: either as an other label for the Caravaggisti in the baroque, or 19th and 20th centuries, fundamentally impressionist schools.

Concerning light as a medium of art, historically light art is confined to the use of artificial light in artworks. This culminates in the paradoxical situation in which machines producing light environments are not the artworks themselves, but the artwork is how they modulate their environments, based on the conventionally taken-for granted, thus solely reflected fact that light is what constitutes our environment.

In the broad sense, of which Gerhard Auer stated in 2004:

"An uncertified term: Light Art had naturalised itself recently, without being fit for a term of either a genre, nor a style: in many symbiotic relations, light plays too many roles, and artificial light made itself only the source of inspiration instead of naming it in the countless isms that are drawing on it."

Any artwork containing something that emits any light may be considered as a piece of light art.

== Terms ==
Closest may be the Lumino kinetic art as a comprehensive term in English, in use from the 1960s. Light Art is a fairly new construction, as a mirror translation from Dutch or German: Lichtkunst. The pioneers of light art, being devoted to it, felt the necessity to give it certain names in order to distinguish their art from any other genres of art like painting, sculpture or photography. Even calling the art of light 'the eighth art', Thomas Wilfred termed his works Lumia from 1919 on. László Moholy-Nagy, in his numerous writings from the 1920s on, repeatedly published on 'light architecture' or 'light plays'. Just before lumino-kinetics became widespread, Nicholas Schöffer labeled his own works first as 'spatial dynamic' then 'light dynamic' (luminodynamisme), from 1957 to end up in his 'time dynamic' phase. Frank Malina termed his artworks developed from 1956 on 'lumidyne systems'.

== History ==
The first examples of modern light art appeared after the discovery of electric lighting made long-term lighting safe and affordable at the end of the 19th century. Light art, however, did not become a dedicated form of art until the late 20th century, in large part due to pioneering work begun in 1969, as part of an experimental program at the Los Angeles County Museum of Art, by Robert Irwin and James Turrell.

=== Modernism, Constructivism and the Bauhaus (1920–1935) ===
Light has been used for architectural effect throughout human history. However, the modern concept of light art emerged with the development of artificial electric incandescent light sources and experimentation by modern artists of the Constructivist and Bauhaus movements. "Prounenraum (Proun Room) (1923), by El Lissitzky, is considered by many art historians to be the first time an artist incorporated architectural lighting elements as a component integral to his work." The first object-based light sculpture was the Light-Space Modulator (1922–1930), by László Moholy-Nagy. Experimentation and innovations in theatrical light have often influenced other areas of light use such as light art. The development of Modernism and the electric light go hand-in-hand; the idea of the modern city with high-rises and electric light epitomizes this development.

All visual art uses light in some form, but in modern photography and motion pictures, use of light is especially important. However, with the invention of electrical artificial light, possibilities expanded and many artists began using light as the main form of expression, rather than solely as a vehicle for other forms of art. Constructivist Naum Gabo experimented with the transparent materiality light reflects on an object; his Linear Construction No. 1 (1943) provides an example of this.

Large-scale displays of light require the collaboration of the authorities. An early example is the utilization of the majority of the searchlights of the German Air Force by Albert Speer for his Cathedral of Light, a feature of the Nazi Party rallies at Nuremberg between 1934 and 1938.

Art critic Hilarie M. Sheets explains that "the interplay of dark and light has been a theme running from Greek and Roman sculpture to Renaissance painting to experimental film. But as technology advanced from the glow of the electric light bulb to the computer monitor, artists have been experimenting with actual light as material and subject."

=== Light design, Lumino kinetic and op art (1940–1970) ===
The early experimental theater sets of Josef Svoboda were crafted using solely light and water vapor in the form of micro-droplets of water scrim-like fields of light. The Czech designer and scenographic engineer's use of light and light projections were influenced by Jindřich Honzl, who believed that "Light, which is the fourth dimension of stage poetry in space, is the most mobile and therefore the most theatrical of all material elements." In the 1960s he began using laser technology having received support from the Siemens Company. In the 70s he began incorporating holography in his sets, stating that "What attracted me to holography was the idea of volumetric light, without any concrete support, volumes floating in space"

=== Projection mapping ===
Closely associated art forms are projectors, 3-D projection, multi-media, video art, and photography where light technology projects images rather than using light as the medium. Large light festivals and events have helped to develop the use of light on large canvases such as architectural facades, building projections, the flood lighting of buildings with colour, and interactive media facades. These forms of light art have their antecedents in new media-based, video art and photography which are sometimes classified as light art since light and movement are important to the work.

=== Digital graffiti ===
Also included in the light art genre is the so-called light graffiti including projection onto buildings, arrangement of lighted windows in buildings, and painting with hand-held lights onto film using time exposure.

=== Light art installations ===
An example of a light art installation was that of artists Mel and Dorothy Tanner, who began adding light to their paintings and sculptures at their studio in Miami, Florida, in 1967. This was the same time period as that of Light and Space artists James Turrell and Robert Irwin in Los Angeles, on the opposite U.S. coast. The Tanners worked very closely for over 40 years until Mel Tanner died in 1993. Their main project was the creation of Lumonics that consists of their light sculptures, live projection, video, electronics and music as a total art installation. Author and art historian Michael Betancourt described this conceptual art as a Gesamtkunstwerk in his book The Lumonics Theater: The Art of Mel & Dorothy Tanner, published in 2004. Dorothy Tanner, born in 1923, continued her light art from her studio in Denver, and co-directed the Lumonics School of Light Art with Marc Billard, until her death in 2020.

Another artist working in light installation is Grimanesa Amorós, who since the early 2000s has created large-scale, site-specific works using LED lighting, diffusion materials, and programmed lighting sequences. Her installations include Uros House (2011) in New York's Times Square, Golden Waters (2015) over the Arizona Canal in Scottsdale, Arizona, and Hedera (2018) at the Prospect Park band shell in Brooklyn. The author and curator Judith K. Brodsky has discussed Amorós's public light works in the context of feminist and community-based art.

=== Museums ===
Many modern art museums include light sculptures and installations in their permanent and temporary collections. The Centre for International Light Art in Unna, Germany, is a museum dedicated to the collection and presentation of light art.

The Light Art Museum in Eindhoven, Netherlands, another museum dedicated to the display of light art, closed on 5 December 2010 due to insufficient funding, but at the Strijp-S complex, one can see the Fakkel by Har Hollands, Daan Roosegaarde's Crystal as well as part of the light festival GLOW.

Many well-known art museums, such as the San Francisco Museum of Modern Art and the Museum of Modern Art in New York, often have temporary light art exhibits and installations in their galleries.

=== Light festivals ===
Light art festivals are public events featuring large-scale light-based artworks, including sculptures, projections, and interactive installations. The Festival of Lights (Lyon) in France traces its origins to a tradition of public illuminations established in 1852. In 1999, the event developed into its modern four-day festival format, incorporating contemporary light installations and attracting international visitors.

Other notable examples include Vivid Sydney in Australia, first held in 2009, and i Light Singapore, launched in 2010, which incorporates sustainability into its programming through artworks using energy-efficient lighting and environmentally friendly materials. Further examples include the Signal Festival in Prague, the Ghent Light Festival in Belgium, and Noor Riyadh in Saudi Arabia. The latter attracted more than three million visitors in 2024, presenting over 60 artworks by artists from 18 countries.

== Artists working with light ==
- 1024 architecture
- Grimanesa Amorós
- Jim Campbell
- U-ram Choe
- Sergio Valle Duarte
- Olafur Eliasson
- Tracey Emin
- Cerith Wyn Evans
- Dan Flavin
- Ivana Franke
- HC Gilje
- Kurt Hentschlager
- Jenny Holzer
- Robert Irwin
- Shun Ito
- Ann Veronica Janssens
- Kimchi and Chips
- Meeli Kõiva
- Brigitte Kowanz
- Ulf Langheinrich
- Joanie Lemercier
- Glenn Ligon
- Tom Lloyd
- Rafael Lozano-Hemmer
- Anthony McCall
- Tatsuo Miyajima
- François Morellet
- Bruce Munro
- Jan van Munster
- Ivan Navarro
- Nonotak
- Maria Nordman
- Numen / For Use
- Christian Partos
- Maja Petric
- Otto Piene
- Erwin Redl
- Daan Roosegaarde
- Keith Sonnier
- Josef Svoboda
- Shiro Takatani
- Mel and Dorothy Tanner
- Lachlan Turczan
- James Turrell
- Leo Villareal
- Visual System
- Tim White-Sobieski
- Austine Wood Comarow

== See also ==
- Noor Riyadh
- Sharjah Light Festival
- LED art
- Light painting
- Snow lantern
- Lightpainting
- Kunsthalle Detroit – a light art institution
- Minimalism
- Dan Flavin
- François Morellet
- James Turrell
- Robert Irwin
