= Kunsthalle Detroit =

Light art institution

Coordinates: 42°23′16.4″N 83°4′51.4″W

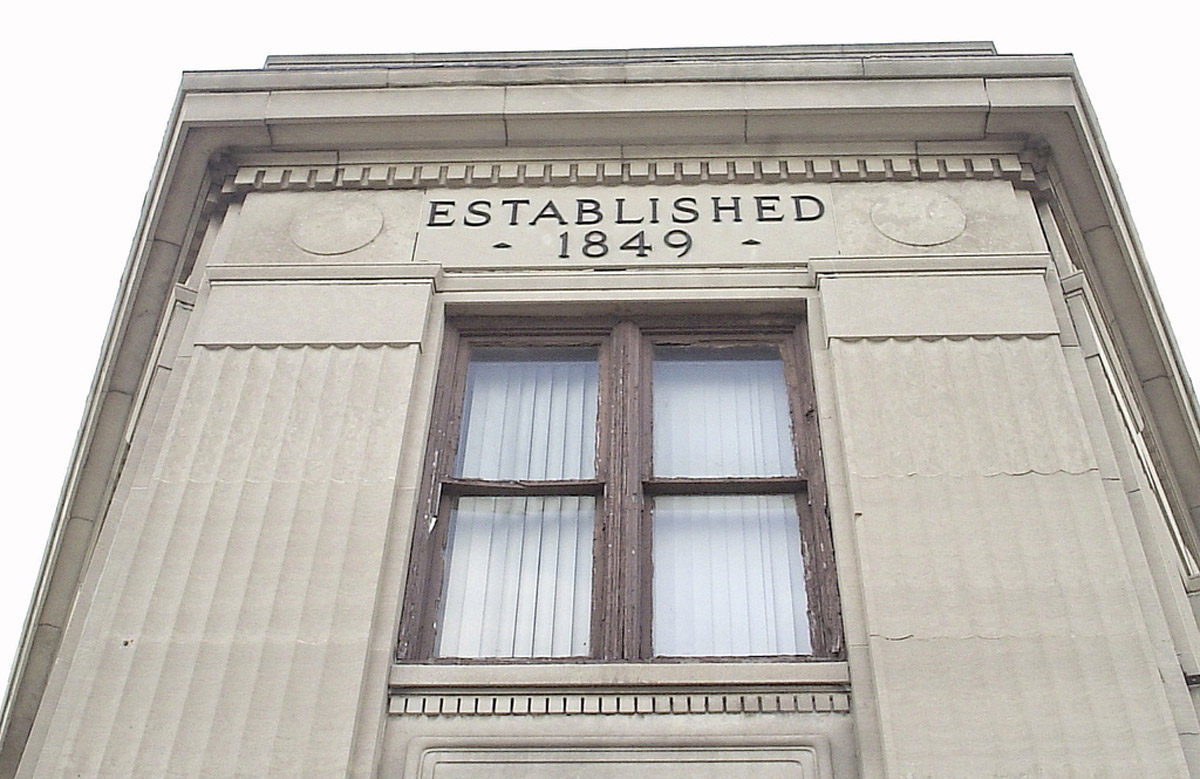
Kunsthalle Detroit was initially housed in the former Comerica Bank building.

Kunsthalle Detroit is a non-profit 501(c)(3) art institution that is focused on contemporary visual art that uses light as a medium. The institution was formed in 2009 in Detroit, Michigan by Tate Osten, who has stated that she chose light art because it shows how the 21st century has progressed with technology. Artist Tim White-Sobieski came up with the name for the institution and is meant to emulate European kunsthallen. The German word "kunsthalle" was also used to provide for wide and international access to the Midwest's "most blighted city" as to the new, fruitful grounds for arts and cultural development. The founders also proposed a plan for a Light Biennale called "Luminale Detroit". The plan eventually scaled down to a weekend of light artworks under the name "Delectricity". NewNowNext has credited Kunsthalle Detroit as being "one of only a few of its kind in the world". Kunsthalle Detroit is privately funded.

Kunsthalle Detroit was initially located in a building on Grand River Avenue in Detroit, however this building was later sold in 2015 to a local entrepreneur.

Kunsthalle Detroit is a 501(c)(3) non profit arts museum. Eleven years after its founding, Kunsthalle Detroit relocated to 8200 Gratiot Ave., Detroit MI 48213. Currently, international projects expanded to Germany, where a 200-year-old mansion is being restored and converted to an art venue in the small village of Glashütte (Lamspringe, Lower Saxony).

== Exhibitions ==
Kunsthalle Detroit has held multiple exhibitions, starting in 2011 with "Time and Place". They held three more, "Light Fiction" (2012), "Citydrift" (2013), and "I See You" (2014). Artists that have been exhibited included Bill Viola, Joan Jonas, William Kentridge, Ange Leccia, Mariana Vasileva, Sebastian Diaz Morales, Saskia Olde Wolbers, Jesper Just and many others.
