= Field of Light =

Site-specific light-based installation

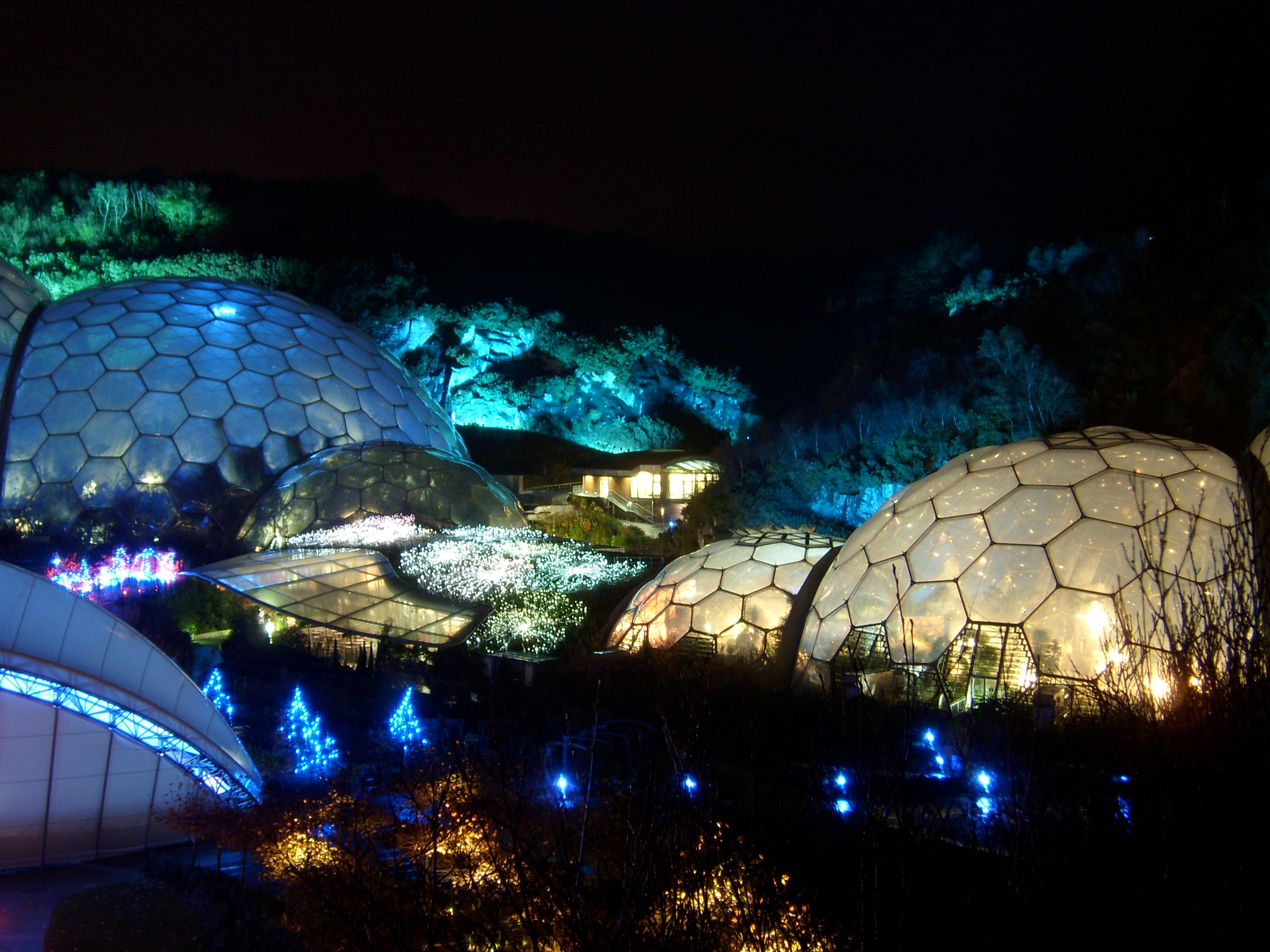
Field of Light at the Eden Project.

The Field of Light is a large-scale site-specific light-based installation created by British artist Bruce Munro. It has been staged in many different locations around the world.

The sculpture slowly changes colour, creating a shimmering field of light.

== History ==
Field of Light was originally conceived in 1992, when Munro took a farewell road trip through central Australia with his fiancée (now wife), prior to their return to England, camping at Uluru/Ayers Rock. To Munro, the red desert had an incredible feeling of energy, ideas seemed to radiate from it along with the heat. "There was a charge in the air that gave me a very immediate feeling which I didn't fully understand, the artist said, "It was a moment when I felt at one with the world....I recorded thoughts of creating a sculpture on a landscape scale, incongruous in size and location, and experienced by the transient visitors...I saw in my mind a landscape of illuminated stems that, like dormant seeds in a dry desert, quietly wait until darkness falls, under a blazing blanket of southern stars, to bloom with gentle rhythms of light." The Field of Light installation was one idea that landed in the artist's sketch book and refused to dislodge from his mind, until finally realized for the first time in 2004.'

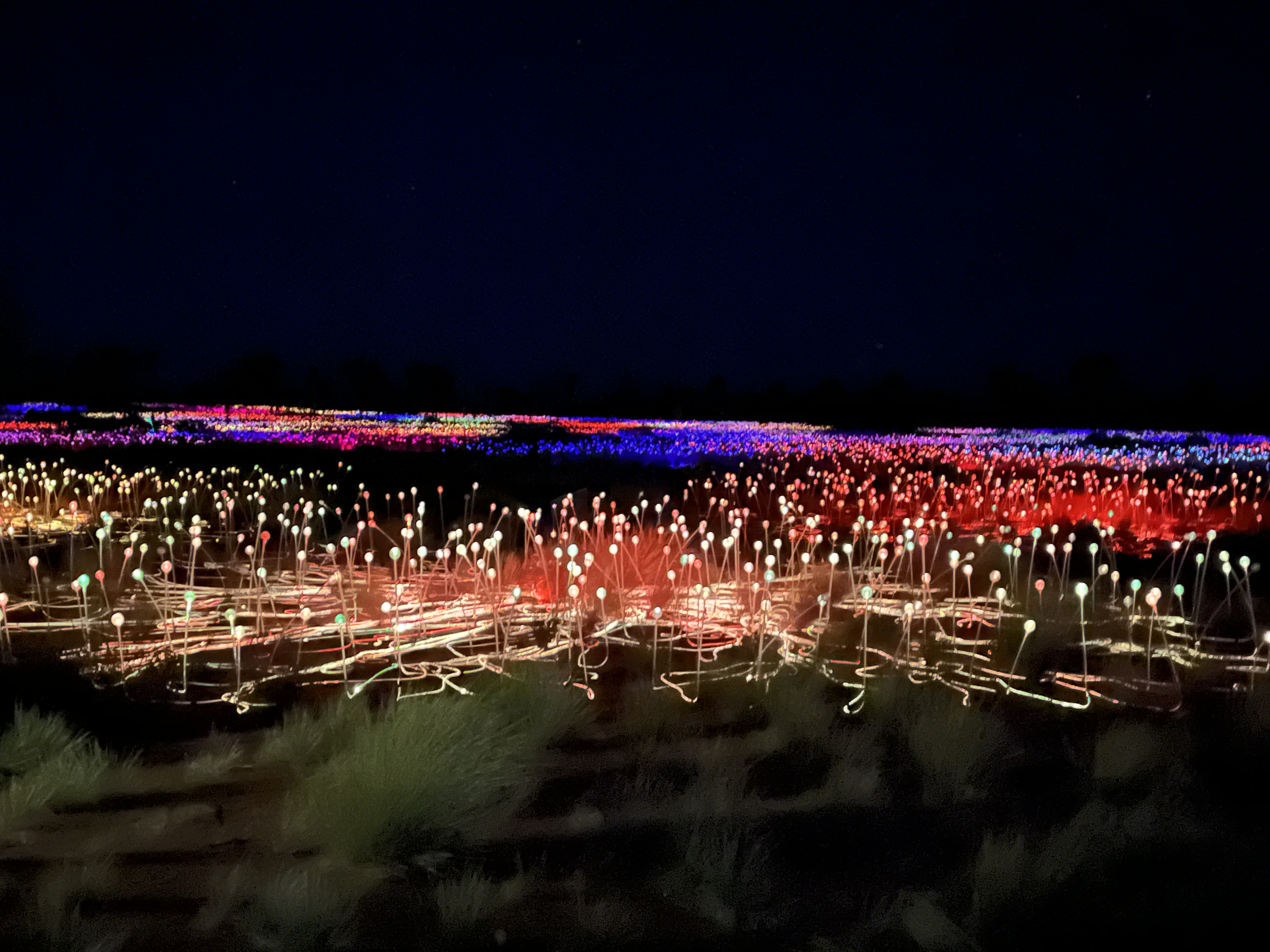
The Field of Light exhibition at Uluru

Munro made his first prototype Field of Light for London's Harvey Nichols department store. Shortly after Field of Light was exhibited at the ''Brilliant!'' Exhibition at the Victoria and Albert Museum in 2004, Munro developed a larger version of the installation for Long Knoll Field in Wiltshire –a field adjacent to his studio that is bisected by a public footpath. Subsequently, Munro has continued to produce site-specific iterations of the artwork in a number of places, often as one element among many within a large solo exhibition.

== List of installation sites ==
The Field of Light has been installed at:

- Eden Project, Cornwall, England. 2008–2009.
- Holburne Museum, Bath, England. 2011–2012.
- Longwood Gardens, Kennet Square, Pennsylvania, United States. (Forest of Light and Field of Light) June–October 2012.
- Waddesdon Manor, the Rothschild Collection, Aylesbury, England. (River of Light, and Field of Light) Annual Exhibition Residency, 2012-2015
- Cheekwood Botanical Gardens and Museum of Art, Nashville, Tennessee, United States. May–November 2013
- Franklin Park Conservatory, Columbus, Ohio, United States. October-2013-March 2014
- St Andrews Square, Edinburgh, Scotland. Commissioned by the City of Edinburgh Council. February–April 2014
- Parque Lincoln, Simbionte Festival, Mexico City, Mexico. April 2014
- Discovery Green, Houston, Texas, United States. November. Commissioned by Discovery Green Conservancy. 2014–February 2015 and November 2015–February 2016.
- Atlanta Botanical Garden, (Forest of Light) Atlanta, Georgia, United States. April–October 2015
- Desert Botanical Garden, Phoenix, Arizona, United States. November 2015-May 2016
- Uluru, Yulara Drive, Northern Territory, Australia. March 2016 - ongoing.

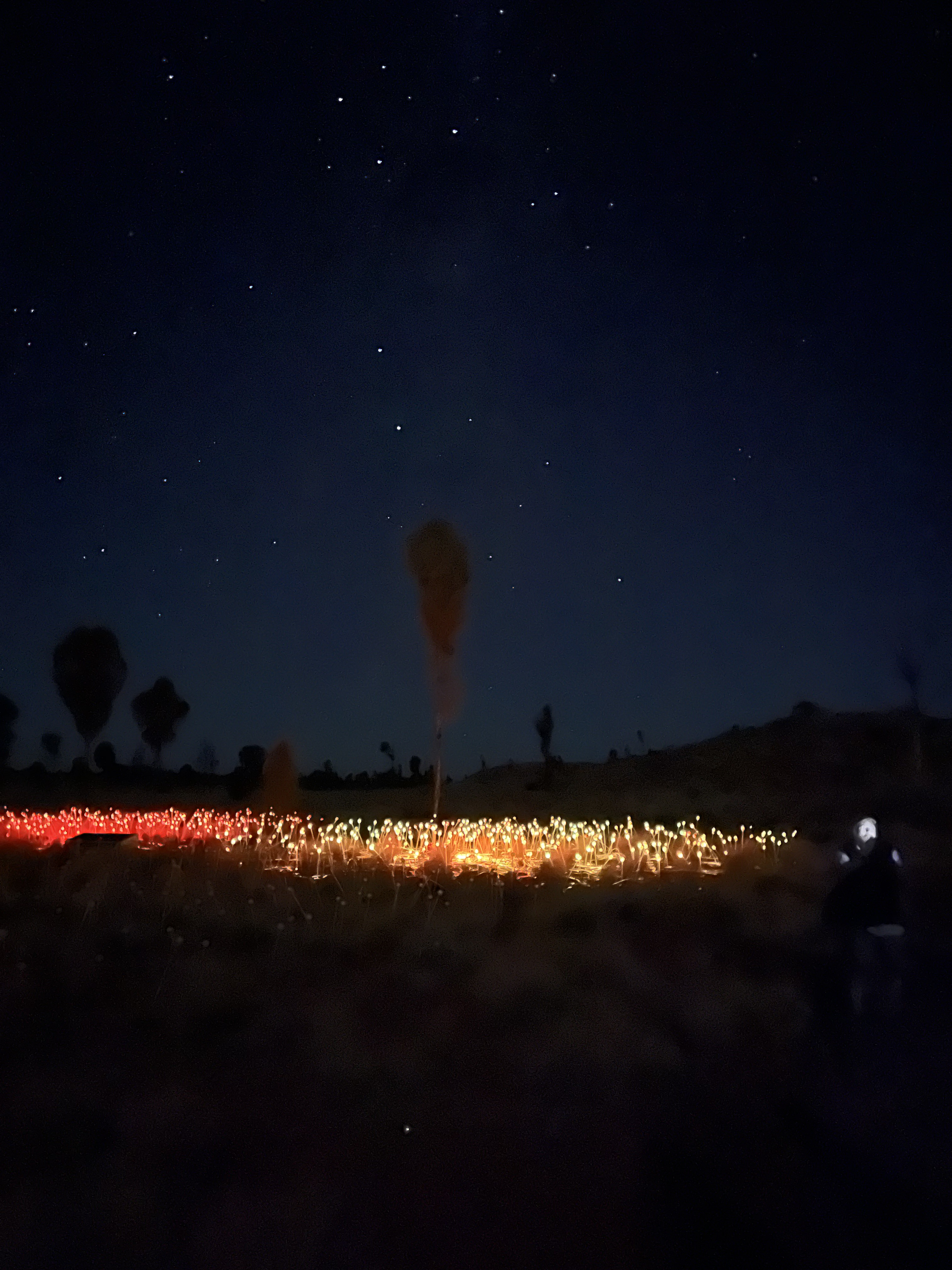
The Southern Cross constellation above the Field of Light at Uluru

- Waddesdon Manor, the Rothschild Collection, Aylesbury, England. November 2016-January 2017
- Nicholas Conservatory and Gardens, Rockford, Illinois, United States. June 2017-November 2017
- Avenue of honour, Mount Clarence, Albany, Western Australia. October 2018 - April 2019
- Sensorio, Paso Robles, California, United States. May 18, 2019 - ongoing.
- Brookgreen Gardens, Murrels Inlet, South Carolina, United States. April 4 - September 12, 2020.
- Lady Bird Johnson Wildflower Center, Austin, Texas, United States, September 2021 - May 2023.
- Freedom Plaza, New York, New York, United States, December 2023 - November 2024.
