= Kunsthalle =

Facility that mounts temporary art exhibitions

A kunsthalle (German pronunciation: [ˈkʊnstˌhalə]) is a facility that mounts temporary art exhibitions, similar to an art gallery. It is distinct from an art museum by not having a permanent collection.

In the German-speaking regions of Europe, Kunsthallen are often operated by a non-profit Kunstverein ("art association" or "art society"), and have associated artists, symposia, studios and workshops. They are sometimes called a Kunsthaus.

== Origin, spelling and variants ==
The term kunsthalle is a loanword from the German Kunsthalle, a compound noun formed by combining the two nouns Kunst (art) and Halle (hall).

Like all nouns in German, the word is written with an initial capital letter. In English, it should be written with a lower-case letter (kunsthalle) unless it is the first word of a sentence or part of a title. The plural form Kunsthallen is usually rendered as kunsthalles.

The term is translated as kunsthal in Danish, kunsthal in Dutch, kunstihoone in Estonian, taidehalli in Finnish, kunsthall in Norwegian and konsthall in Swedish.

== List of kunsthalles ==
This list contains exhibition venues, museums, and art societies that can be considered kunsthalles.

=== Austria ===
- Kunsthaus Graz, Graz
- Kunsthalle Krems (foundation)
- Kunsthalle Wien; see also Museumsquartier, Vienna (municipal)
- KunstHausWien, Vienna
- Secessionsgebäude (Secession Building), Vienna

=== Belgium ===
- Kunsthal Gent, Ghent
- Kunsthalle Lophem, Loppem
- Kunsthal Extra City, Antwerp

=== Czech Republic ===
- Kunsthalle Praha, Prague
- Galerie Rudolfinum, Prague

=== Denmark ===
- Kunsthal Aarhus, Aarhus
- Kunsthal Charlottenborg, Copenhagen
- Nikolaj Kunsthal, (previously known as Kunsthallen Nikolaj), Copenhagen

=== Estonia ===
- Tallinn Art Hall, Tallinn (Tallinna Kunstihoone)

=== Finland ===
- Kunsthalle Helsinki, Helsinki (Helsingin Taidehalli)
- Kunsthalle Kohta, Helsinki (Kohta Taidehalli)
- Kunsthalle Turku, Turku (Turun Taidehalli)

=== France ===
- La Kunsthalle Mulhouse, Alsace
- Château de Montsoreau-Museum of Contemporary Art, Montsoreau

=== Georgia ===
- Kunsthalle Tbilisi, Tbilisi

=== Germany ===
- Kunsthalle Baden-Baden (state-run)
- Kunsthalle Bielefeld — with permanent collection (municipal)
- Kunsthalle Bonn (German federal)
- Kunsthalle Bremen — with a permanent collection (Kunstverein in Bremen)
- Kunsthalle Bremerhaven (Kunstverein Bremerhaven)
- Kunsthalle Darmstadt (Kunstverein Darmstadt)
- Kunsthalle Düsseldorf (municipal)
- Kunsthalle in Emden — with permanent collection (foundation)
- Kunsthalle Erfurt (municipal/Erfurter Kunstverein)
- Schirn Kunsthalle Frankfurt, Frankfurt (municipal)
- Kunsthalle Hamburg — with permanent collection, see Hamburger Kunsthalle (state-run)
- Kunsthalle Göppingen (municipal/Kunstverein Göppingen)
- Kunsthalle Karlsruhe — with permanent collection (state-run)
- Kunsthalle Fridericianum Kassel, Fridericianum (municipal)
- Kunsthalle zu Kiel — with permanent collection (state-run)
- Kunsthalle Königsberg, now a market in Kaliningrad
- Kunsthalle der Sparkasse Leipzig (foundation)
- Kunsthalle Kunstverein Lingen (Kunstverein Lingen)
- Kunsthalle Mainz, Mainz
- Kunsthalle Mannheim — with permanent collection (municipal)
- Kunsthalle München, Munich
- Kunsthalle Münster, Münster
- Kunsthalle Nürnberg (municipal)
- Kunsthalle Rostock, Rostock
- Kunsthaus Tacheles, Berlin
- Kunsthalle Tübingen — with permanent collection (municipal/foundation)
- Kunsthalle Wilhelmshaven (municipal/Verein der Kunstfreunde Wilhelmshaven)

=== Hungary ===
- Kunsthalle Budapest, Budapest, Hungary

=== Italy ===
- AnonimaKunsthalle, Varese
- Kunsthalle Bozen, Bolzano
- Kunsthalle Meran, Merano

=== Netherlands ===
- Kunsthal KAdE, Amersfoort
- Kunsthal Rotterdam, Rotterdam

=== Norway ===
- Bergen Kunsthall, Bergen
- Kunsthall Oslo, Oslo
- Kunsthall Stavanger, Stavanger
- Kunsthall Trondheim, Trondheim

=== Poland ===
- Kunsthalle Breslau/Wrocław
- Kunsthalle Danzig/Gdańsk

=== Portugal ===
- Kunsthalle Lissabon, Lisbon, Portugal

=== Romania ===
- Kunsthalle Bega/Timișoara

=== Slovakia ===
- Kunsthalle Bratislava, Bratislava
- Kunsthalle Košice, Košice

=== Switzerland ===
- Kunsthalle Arbon
- Kunsthalle Basel (Basler Kunstverein)
- Kunsthalle Bern (Verein der Kunsthalle Bern)
- Fri Art Kunsthalle, Fribourg
- Neue Kunst Halle St. Gallen (foundation)
- Kunsthalle Zürich (municipal/Verein Kunsthalle Zürich)
- Kunsthaus Zürich

=== United States ===
- New Museum, New York City, New York
- Aspen Art Museum, Aspen, Colorado
- Institute of Contemporary Art, San Jose, California
- MassArt Art Museum, Boston, Massachusetts
- Kunsthalle Detroit, Michigan
- Contemporary Arts Museum Houston, Texas
- Portsmouth Museum of Art
- Dallas Contemporary Texas
- MOCA Ohio
- Institute of Contemporary Art, Philadelphia, Pennsylvania
- The Renaissance Society at the University of Chicago
- Contemporary Art Museum St. Louis
- Center for Maine Contemporary Art, Rockland, Maine
- Blaffer Art Museum University of Houston, Texas
- Visual Arts Center at the University of Texas at Austin
- Moss Arts Center Virginia Tech, Blacksburg, Virginia
- Sarasota Art Museum Ringling College of Art and Design, Sarasota, FL

== See also ==
- Art exhibition
- Art gallery
