= Bruce Munro =

English-Australian artist

Bruce Beaton St Clair Munro (born 2 June 1959) is a dual nationality English/Australian artist known for producing large immersive site-specific installations, often by massing components in the thousands. Frequently, Munro's subject matter is his own experience of fleeting moments of rapport with the world and existence in its largest sense, of being part of life's essential pattern. His reoccurring motif is the use of light on an environmental scale in order to create an emotional response for the viewer.

An artistic diarist, Munro has spent over 40 years collecting and recording ideas and images in his sketchbooks, which he returns to over time for source material. Language, literature, science, and music have also greatly influenced his work.

== Life and career ==
Munro was born in London, the youngest of the three children of Judith Ames and Brian Munro. His parents divorced in 1965.

In 1977, he completed a Foundation course in Art and Design at Braintree Technical College, and in 1982 graduated from Bristol Polytechnic in Fine Art with a focus on painting. He traveled to Sydney, Australia in 1984, intending it to be a six-month working holiday, but instead staying eight years. In 1988 Munro was granted Australian citizenship under dual nationality with Great Britain.

While working in Australia, Munro was chagrined when a colleague referred to him as having 'a butterfly mind,' meaning his mind was unsettled and scattered, but the comment struck a chord. In response, he decided to narrow his vision to the medium of light. The artist said, "when I decided to work in light, almost 30 years ago, I chose it very carefully because I knew I needed some kind of focus. I thought that working in a medium that was very pure and true would simplify my ability to express all the different ideas that filled my head."

In 1985, Munro started an illuminated display business in Sydney, which he sold in 1988 and went on to work for its new owners, learning about manufacturing and production techniques. He purposely left his fine art ambitions aside, as he reasoned he needed career experience, but while in Australia he made notes and sketches recording moments of condensed connectivity with nature, feeling that those moments of clarity would be worthy subject matter to reconsider through art.

In 1992 Munro and his fiancée, Serena Ludovici, began a camping tour of Australia prior to their planned return to England. While camping at Uluru (Ayers Rock) he conceived of an artwork that would bloom at night, like dormant desert seeds responding to rain, and recorded the idea in his sketchbook. In 1993 he and his wife Serena moved to the country in Dorset, where he intended to make a living as a painter, which proved to be an unrealistic goal. In 1994, his second child was born. Aware of his family commitments, he started a tile business and in 1995 joined Kevin McCloud design studio. In 1996 Munro once again embarked on his own business realizing mostly residential projects in paint, tile, and lighting and began a series of bespoke designs.

In 1999, his father died on 12 August. As a result, Munro was beset with anxiety, fear, and a loss of confidence for six months to a year, and began to think again about simple experiences of connection as source material for making personal work. In 2003 the Munros, now a family of six, purchased Long Knoll, a sixteenth-century derelict farmhouse and outbuildings, with a ten-acre large field bisected by a public footpath. Also in 2003, Harvey Nichols, the London retailer, commissioned a window display of 10,000 illuminated stems.

In 2004 Munro participated in the Victoria and Albert Museum's "Brilliant!" exhibition, using 5,000 of the Harvey Nichols components. He hired two young lads from the nearby village to stake out his first true Field of Light, based on his originating inspiration at Uluru, in the field behind his home. Munro left the illuminated field up from 2004 to 2005, with a sign reading, "Please turn the lights off when you're finished."

Munro was then invited to recreate Field of Light at the Eden Project in Cornwall (Winter 2008/9) and participated in the 2010 exhibition "Contemplating the Void: Interventions in the Guggenheim Museum," at the Solomon R. Guggenheim Museum, New York, NY. In 2011 he exhibited another iteration of Field of Light at the Holburne Museum in Bath.

In 2022 Munro will present his first museum exhibition in Australia at Heide Museum of Modern Art, "From Sunrise Road".

In 2023 Light Field, The Art of Bruce Munro, written by Fiona Gruber was published by Lund Humphries.

== Selected works and projects ==
Field of Light, (2004– ) Munro is best known for site-specific iterative versions of Field of Light, including Forest of Light, 2012, at Longwood Gardens, Kennett Square, PA, and River of Light, 2013, at Waddesdon Manor, the Rothschild Collection, Buckinghamshire, UK. Writing about "Forest of Light" in the Washington Post, journalist Adrian Higgins said, "It is the sheer scale of the work that really touches the imagination…"Forest of Light" is strange and touching and authentic. It is a phenomenon of opposites, organic and synthetic, familiar and otherworldly, tangible and dreamlike."

CDSea (2010) In June 2010, Munro with 140 helpers created an inland sea on Long Knoll field in Wiltshire, using 600,000 recycled compact disks, donated from around the world. The project was inspired by Munro's memory of the play of light on water one afternoon in the 1980s, as he dreamed beside a beach in Sydney, missing his family a half a world away. The artist has returned to the use of reflected light through CDs in other projects, notably Waterlilies, 2012, at Longwood Gardens, Blue Moon on a Platter and Angel of Light, both 2013, at Waddesdon Manor, the Rothschild Collection and The Ferryman's Crossing, 2015, Scottsdale Museum of Contemporary Art.

Water Towers (2011– ) In 2010, Munro exhibited an installation of 69 towers, built from plastic bottles of water and fiber optics, at Salisbury Cathedral, Wiltshire, England. The installation, originally inspired by a book Munro read at age twenty-one, Gifts of Unknown Things, by Lyall Watson, has been recreated in site-specific iterations since.

Light Shower (2008– ) In 2008, Munro developed this artwork for a residential commission in Loch Ossian, Scotland and it has been exhibited in its largest configuration in the Spire Crossing nave on Salisbury Cathedral, Wiltshire, England from 29 November 2010 until January 2011. It has been recreated in site-specific public and private iterations since.

Light and Language (2014– ) In 2014, Munro discovered the work of Korean abstract artist Kim Whanki (1913 - 1974), whose line and mark-making reminded Munro of semaphore; or Morse code transmitted by pulses of light. He was intrigued that by employing Morse code to translate texts, he could produce both pattern and a decipherable message. Each piece in this series reflects a phrase, words or equations that have meaning to the artist and to the subject matter of the artwork. The series includes Snow, 2014, and …---…SOS shown at Waddesdon Manor, The Ferryman's Crossing, 2015, Scottsdale Museum of Contemporary Art, Ferryman's Crossing II and Lighthouse, both 2014, at Hermitage Museum and Gardens. and First Impressions, 2015, Sharjah Museum of Contemporary Art, Sharjah, UAE.

== Exhibitions ==
2002: Exhibits Sputnik Pendant and Snowball chandelier at Sotheby’s Contemporary exhibition, Bond Street London; solo exhibition at King’s Library Development Chelsea Harbour.

2003: Harvey Nichols, Knightsbridge, London, commissions a window display of 10,000 illuminated stems, first iteration of Field of Light.

2004: Creates another version of Field of Light for Victoria & Albert Museum’s ‘Brilliant’ exhibition; instals first true Field of Light at Long Knoll.

2008: Creates Field of Light for the Eden Project, St Austell, Cornwall; designs first Light Shower for Corrour House, Loch Ossian, Scotland.

2010: Creates CDSea using 600,000 CDs at Long Knoll; exhibits Water-Towers and Light Shower at Salisbury Cathedral; participates in Contemplating the Void: Interventions in the Guggenheim Museum exhibition, New York.

2011: Biennale Kijkduin, the Netherlands; Field of Light exhibited at Holburne Museum, Bath, UK; creates Star Turn as a fundraiser for Help for Heroes.

2012: First solo US exhibition at Longwood Gardens, Pennsylvania; exhibits at Waddesdon Manor, Buckinghamshire, UK; the Oslo Festival of Light, Tjuvholmen, Norway; Pratt Institute, NY; and in Madrid sponsored by Telefonica, S.A.

2013: Two exhibitions in US at Cheekwood Botanical Garden and Museum of Art, Nashville Tennessee and Franklin Park Conservatory Columbus, Ohio. Exhibition at Waddesdon Manor as part of annual residency through to 2015.

2014: Exhibits Field of Light in urban locations; Edinburgh, at the Simbionte Festival, Mexico City and at Discovery Green, Houston, Texas; completes Rhythm and Blues II a public art commission at Wiltshire Music Center, Bradford on Avon, UK, Exhibition in the US at Hermitage Museum and Gardens, Norfolk VA, latter acquires a Light Shower commission for permanent collection. Begins Light and Language series of work. Exhibits first Morse code pieces including Ferryman’s Crossing II at Hermitage and Waddesdon Manor, Star at Salisbury Cathedral and Between Worlds at Bath Spa University.

2015: Exhibition at Atlanta Botanical Garden, Atlanta Georgia, Desert Radiance – installation of light works in four locations across Scottsdale, Arizona; Islamic Arts Festival, Sharjah Art Museum, Sharjah, UAE; final exhibition at Waddesdon Manor.

2016: Opens Field of Light at Uluru; Ashmolean Museum, Oxford commissions Impression: Time Crossing Culture for its entrance; Sotheyby’s annual Beyond Limits exhibition at Chatsworth House with the artwork Time and Again; solo exhibition at Minnesota Landscape Arboretum, Chaska, Minnesota.

2017: Second year of Field of Light at Uluru; exhibition at Nicholas Conservatory and Gardens and Green Mountain Falls, Colorado. Presents work Thank you for a Very Enjoyable Game at Colorado Springs Fine Arts Centre; first European exhibition, in Sweden, at Garden Society of Gothenburg and Slottskogen; installation in Odense, Denmark to celebrate the 175th anniversary of the citizenship of Hans Christian Andersen.

2018: Field of Light at Uluru retained through to 2020; lead artist at sculpture park Jeju Light Art Festa South Korea; installation for WWI Avenue of Honour, Albany, Australia; Bruce Munro at Montalvo: Stories in Light, Montalvo Art Centre in Saratoga, California.

2019: Opening of Field of Light at Sensorio, Paso Robles, California. Field of Light Uluru retained indefinitely; opening of outdoor exhibition Tropical Light, Darwin; Messums Wiltshire hosts exhibition Bruce Munro Time & Place.

2020: New artwork Time and Place, at Salisbury Cathedral for 800th Anniversary exhibition, ‘Spirit and Endeavour’; Brookgreen: Southern Light opened in South Carolina, USA; Light Towers installed at Sensorio.

2021: Field of Light opened at Marston Park, Frome, Somerset; Exhibition, Field of Blooms at Chichester Cathedral; Miami Art Basel featured Forest and Field of Light at Pinecrest Gardens.

2022: Mountain Lights in Niseko, Hokkaido, Japan, an installation of Future Light and Arrow Spring opened; Longwood Gardens 10th anniversary exhibition Light: Installations by Bruce Munro; Heide Museum of Modern Art, Melbourne, Australia presented Bruce Munro: From Sunrise Road, his first museum exhibition in Australia. Field of Light exhibited in Austin, Texas.

2023: Light-Towers, opened in Kings Canyon, NT, Australia; Fireflies and Gone Fishing were added to Sensorio; Cheekwood Gardens 10th Anniversary exhibition Light opened in Nashville, Tennessee, the Dorothy House Hospice in Wiltshire unveiled Fireflies, an artwork donated to help raise funds for the charity; Field of Light, opened in Manhattan, New York.

2024: Mountain Lights, in Niseko, Hokkaido, Japan include ‘New Artwork’ Prismatic Spring, and also Moon Blooms into the exhibition. Field of Light opened in Salcombe, to raise money for the RNLI; Velarde Gallery, Kingsbridge, Devon, presented Light Creations.

2025: Ramandu’s Table and a vertical iteration of C-Scales were shown at the ‘Bristol Light Festival’; Water Lilies were featured as part of the ‘Autostadt’s Easter celebration; Trail of Light, an exhibition of 12,000 Fireflies, opened in Mildura, Australia; Gallery exhibition Time and Place, opened in the MAC Gallery, Mildura, Australia, before travelling to the Mars Gallery in Melbourne; FOSO (Fibre Optic Symphonic Orchestra) opened at Sensorio.

== Personal life ==
Munro lives and works in Wiltshire. He and his wife Serena have four children.

== See also ==
- Light art
- Land art
