= Stephen Knapp =

American artist (1947–2017)

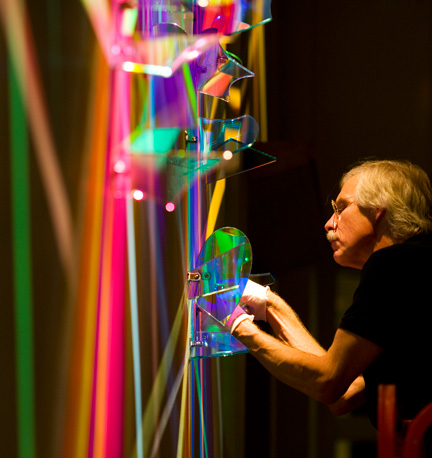
- Stephen Knapp assembling a lightpainting, 2006.
- Born: October 15, 1947; Worcester, Massachusetts
- Died: November 24, 2017 (aged 70); Worcester, Massachusetts, U.S.
- Education: Hamilton College
- Known for: Architectural installation, mixed-media sculpture, photography, and ceramics
- Movement: Lightpainting

Stephen Knapp (October 15, 1947 – November 24, 2017) was an American artist best known for his use of the medium of lightpainting. A native of Worcester, Massachusetts, he gained an international reputation for large-scale works of art held in museums, public, corporate, and private collections, which are executed in media as diverse as light, kiln-formed glass, metal, stone, mosaic, and ceramic.

Knapp wrote and lectured on architectural art glass, the collaborative process, and the integration of art and architecture. His work has appeared in many publications including Art and Antiques, Architectural Record, ARTnews, Ceramics Monthly, The Chicago Sun Times, Honoho Geijutsu, Identity, Interior Design, Interiors, The New York Times, Nikkei Architecture, Progressive Architecture, Sculpture (magazine), and 90+10.

== Life and work ==
Stephen Knapp graduated from Worcester Academy in 1965 and received his B.A. from Hamilton College in 1969. For nearly a decade after graduating from college, he worked as a fine art photographer, selling his work to corporate and private collectors in the United States and abroad. During this early stage in his career, Knapp worked closely with Polaroid Corporation on their 20x24 camera, creating large scale instant photographs.

Soon enough, though, photography seemed insufficient. Knapp began to look more closely at permanent materials. Various types of ceramic, mosaic, metal, stone, and glass filled his studio as he developed the innovations for which he is known today—combining mediums and processing techniques and working craftsmen, fabricators, and manufacturers from around the world on an increasingly grand scale.

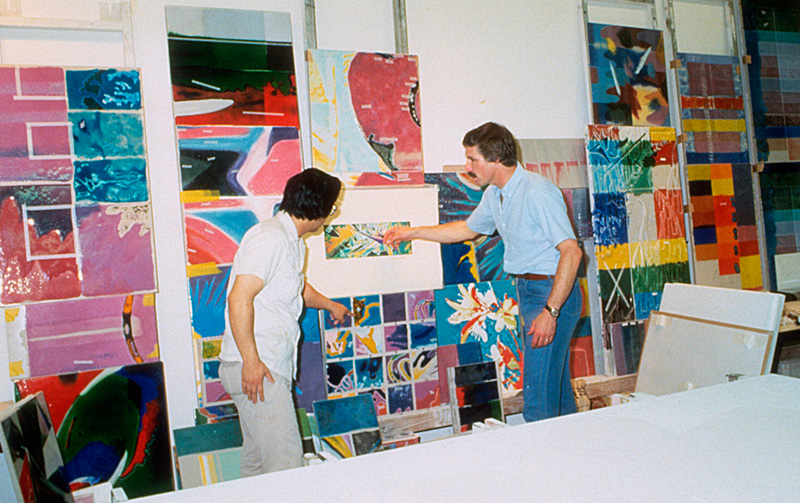
Stephen Knapp (right) at work on a ceramic mural in Shigaraki, Japan, 1985.

Research took Knapp to Japan in 1985, where he created some of the world's largest glass-glaze ceramic murals. He had come upon a factory in Japan that made huge photo-ceramic murals, a technique used by Robert Rauschenberg in the early 1980s. Though the photo decal technique seemed tailor-made for him, he became fascinated with a thick glass glaze—a crackle glaze—that had been developed for architecture. Changing surfaces to reflect the light was to become a major influence on later work.

The following year he used photo-transfer techniques to define the images to be etched and anodized in aluminum, creating one of the world's largest etched-metal murals—a 14-foot × 72-foot piece for the Hamilton County Justice Complex in Cincinnati.

A pattern was now forming—Knapp used the research for one project to enhance the next. When it came time to create two large etched stainless-steel murals for McDonnell Douglas’s Douglas Center in California, he developed a new technique of mixing paints to change the look of the surface depending on the angle of light. The kinetic force of these murals lent a palpable energy to the work. A closer look at the murals reveals his interest in creating illusions of space, which he would later explore in his lightpaintings.

During the 1990s, his increasing fascination with light led Knapp to kiln-formed glass—the heating of glass to take on the shape of a form below, resulting over the decade in large installations across the United States. An acknowledged expert in his field, he frequently wrote and lectured on architectural art glass, the collaborative process, and the integration of art and architecture. In 1998 he authored The Art of Glass for Rockport Publishers.

Also during the 1990s he started spending more time on personal work, creating sculpture as well as furniture from kiln formed glass and steel and hanging pieces of dichroic glass and stainless steel.

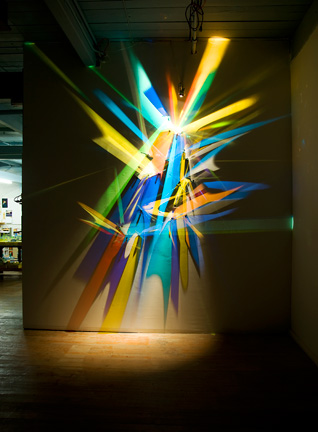
Done for the Night, 2008, light, glass, stainless steel, 13' x 12' x 10'.

In 2002, after nearly a decade of development, Knapp introduced his lightpaintings. No longer hanging glass and steel structures, in these new works the glass was attached to walls with a single light fixture illuminating the entire piece. The light that passed through the various pieces of glass was no longer an effect in space, as it was in the sculptural lightpaintings, but was now simultaneously collected and dispersed on the wall.

In a series of solo shows in 2004 and 2005 Knapp experimented with new coatings and laminating techniques that took him beyond dichroics and increased the range of his palette and gave him greater control in painting with light.

In 2005, he received his first museum commission from the Flint Institute of Arts, Flint, Michigan. Temporal Meditations, a 9-foot × 30-foot installation, became the first lightpainting in a museum collection.

In 2006, Knapp's first major exterior lightpainting, Luminous Affirmations, a permanent 60-foot × 100-foot exterior installation, was installed on the north face of Tampa, Florida’s City Hall as part of their "Lights on Tampa” program. Large-scale commissions followed throughout 2006, including his Seven Muses, a 35-foot × 95-foot commission for the Charles W. Eisemann Center, in Richardson, Texas, and First Symphony, for the Sursa Performance Hall at Ball State University, Muncie, Indiana.

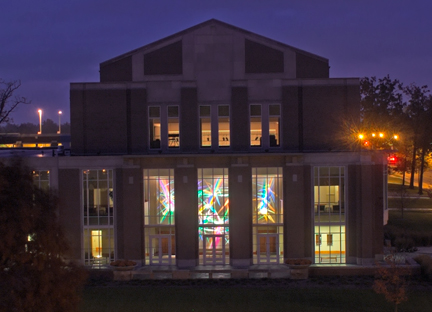
Installation view at night of First Symphony, 2006, at Ball State University, Muncie, Indiana.

In early 2007, "Stephen Knapp: Lightpaintings" opened at the Alden B. Dow Museum in Midland, Michigan, before traveling to the Butler Institute of American Art, in Youngstown, Ohio, followed in 2008 by the Dennos Museum Center, in Traverse City, Michigan, and the South Dakota Museum of Art, and in 2009, by the Dahl Arts Center in Rapid City, South Dakota. The exhibit firmly placed lightpaintings at the intersection between painting and sculpture. 2009 saw a commissioned installations and a solo lightpainting exhibit at the Chrysler Museum of Art, Norfolk, Virginia,

Throughout Knapp's career there have been constants: a continuous research into materials; a commitment to the techniques and processes involved in enlarging his design; an exploration of the historical, cultural and technical precedents that formed the bases for both his personal and commissioned pieces; and, above all, light.
