= Tim White-Sobieski =

Multimedia artist

- Born: 1961 (age 64–65)
- Known for: video art, installation art, photography, light art, painting,
- Notable work: "Confession" 1999-2002, "Terminal", 2001-2003, "Before They Were Beatles" 2004, "Alpha" 2005, "Deconstructed Reality" 2006-2007, "Awakening" 2008, "Light Circles" 2009, "The Sound and the Fury" 2010, "Cold Forest" 2010
- Movement: 21st Century

Tim White-Sobieski is a video and installation artist based in New York and Berlin. He was educated as an architect and dedicated himself to visual art and filmmaking, exploring the fields of painting, sculpture, photography, video, video installations and light installations throughout his career. He began showing in New York in the early 1990s with his "Blue Paintings." Emphasis on the role of the subconscious in his paintings had affinities with visual abstractionism and literary existentialism.

He has consistently been at the technological forefront of video and light art, being called a "video maverick" and "an abstract "'painter of motion.'"

== Life and career ==
Tim White-Sobieski was born in 1961 and emigrated to the United States in 1993.

== Analysis of work ==
Much of his work draws from literary work that has inspired the artist, and he has often featured icons of American literature in his installations. Writers such as Walt Whitman, John Steinbeck, John Updike, Kurt Vonnegut, J.D. Salinger, William Faulkner, and Robert Penn Warren all have a permanent presence in Tim White-Sobieski’s oeuvre.

=== Music and sound in the projects ===
Musically, White-Sobieski composes most of his own film and video soundtracks, but also incorporates the work of his contemporaries such as Brian Eno, David Byrne, Robert Fripp, Pierre Schaeffer, Pierre Boulez, and Steve Reich, as well as classical masters such as Purcell, Pergolesi, and Bach.

=== Important art commissions ===
White-Sobieski has been commissioned by LVMH multiple times, and in 2005, was invited to create an artwork for the new Louis Vuitton Flagship Store on Champs-Elysses in Paris alongside artists James Turrell and Olafur Eliasson. The project consisted of a 24-meter programmed fiber-optics video wall. Another colossal video wall was installed at the Petit Palais for the celebration of the launch. This was a unique cooperation of the three artists. In 2006, the Louis Vuitton Company invited Tim White-Sobieski back to participate in an exhibition entitled "Icons", an interpretation of the iconic logo-bags. Other artists included Marc Jacobs, Zaha Hadid, Ugo Rondinone, Sylvie Fleury, Shigeru Ban, Robert Wilson and Andrée Putman.

In 2008, White-Sobieski created and engineered the video installation Water and Earth for a video wall with 144 synchronized vertical LCD monitors for Gimpo (Kimpo) Airport in Seoul, Korea. The artist continued developing new methods of controlling video with the purpose of integrating a moving image within architectural interiors and displaying it on any shapes, forms and materials.

=== Collections ===
The artist’s inventory of video works currently enlists more than 60 titles, with multi-channel synchronized video installations and stand-alone single theatrical presentations. His video, photography, painting, sculpture, and installation work belongs to the collections of Museo Nacional Centro de Arte Reina Sofía, Madrid, Spain; CGAC Santiago de Compostela, Spain; Denver Art Museum, Domus Artium 2002, Salamanca, Spain; Elgiz Museum of Contemporary Art, Istanbul, Turkey; Museo de Bellas Artes, Santander, Spain; Aena Foundation - FUNDACIÓN AENA, Madrid, Spain; Stiftung kunst:raum Sylt Quelle, Germany; Nomas Foundation, Rome, Italy; and Kunstverein Wiesbaden, Germany.

== Works ==
=== Video installations ===
==== Moving Paintings/Moving Drawings (1993–present) ====
Moving Paintings and Moving Drawings projects were a series of experiments in image animation which were based partially on Lingo scripting language that was used in Macromedia applications. Concomitant with his animation work, the artist became especially interested in the musical architecture of silence of John Cage and in response to Cage's objective to look through sounds and not at them, White-Sobieski created his infinite animations of paintings and drawings as complements to an artwork. White-Sobieski wrote the scripts for programming infinite ways of controlling behavior of shapes, colors and image parameters in a video frame (and in a digital image if not video). The influence of contemporary experimental music has continued to have a great effect White-Sobieski’s work, and composers like Pierre Schaeffer, Pierre Boulez, Steve Reich, Brian Eno, David Byrne, and Robert Fripp have all appeared in his later projects.

One of the most successful experiments in combining Moving Paintings animation principles with real-time video editing/rendering technique was the project "I Repeat Myself When Under Stress," 1999, exhibited in New York, Chicago and Turin. Later, the same methods were developed in hand-rendered films from the Terminal project. Almost each video frame of the series was hand-drawn, and, when assembled, created semi-abstract moving compositions. These projects were critically acclaimed at the Prague Biennale (2003), Lyon Biennale (2003), and Bucharest Biennale (2004).

==== Time of Adolescence Series (1998–2006) ====
Confession (2000–2002), Before They Were Beatles (2004) and Sweet Dreams (2002) developed the subjects of genetic memory and the theme of war. The videos aim to assert the postulation that "memory is perhaps genetically transferred from generation to generation." Confession had a multi-channel narrative sequence and examined migrant literary characters which also appeared in Closer to Fall, Awakening, Route 17N, and The Sound and the Fury.

In 2007, Tim White completed a series of large scale photographs and a video titled Awakening and in 2008, as an expansion on the same theme, Route 17 North. The series’ near-repetition rhythm reveals an image of an American youth at the beginning of the 21st century, in the world of post-modern simulacra. Both of the videos and photographic series demonstrate the influence of American literature on the artist. A short (20 min) multi-channel film The Sound and the Fury followed in 2009, named after the first part of Faulkner’s novel. The first version of the film was shown in Barcelona as Seventh Heaven (based on the subtitle of the literary work, April Seventh, 1928). The work exhibited in the US was received as "astounding."

==== Terminal Series (2000–2005) ====
The Terminal Series consists of a series of videos Terminal by Day (I), Terminal at Night (II), Terminal Dream (III), On the Wing (IV), and Terminal Heart (V)). Terminal (I) originated immediately after the events of September 11 in New York City. The artist's studio was located directly across the street from the WTC and he barely got out in time to escape. The loss of much of his artwork and the possible loss of life had a fundamental impact on his creativity and artistic vision, spawning the Terminal Series.

Between 2004 and 2006, Tim White-Sobieski created several abstract-figurative video compositions: New York City Suite, Vertigo, and Desire among them. The artist continued working in the direction of music-visual synthesis, developing new methods and algorithms to generate color, rhythm and animations based on sound parameters, further developing ideas that were explored in the Moving Paintings projects, using complementing soundtracks by Brian Eno, Robert Fripp's "frippertronics," and experiments of John Cage.

==== Deconstructed Cities (2005–2014) ====
Between 2005-2014, White-Sobieski created a series of films and images of deconstructed cityscapes, eliminating distinctions between design, painting, photography and architecture (New York City Suite (2005), Deconstructed Cities (2007), London, (2007), Katrina, (2008), and Deconstructed Reality(2009)). The first city-related photo-video project, New York City Suite, was shown in galleries and museums in 2006, as well as ArtMiami 2007. There, the artist not only explored the structures of New York's landscape, the face of the city, in concrete, steel, and glass, but he also offered a psychological portrait of New York City residents he saw in the streets, neither friends nor important personae. Based on images of many metropolitan cities of the world, Deconstructed Reality followed. This project is ongoing and ultimately planned to include images of many global metropolises such as Paris, Madrid, Shanghai, Hong Kong, and Tokyo.

The videos Vertigo (2005) and New York City Suite were created based on similar principles of compositions as in the previous "moving drawings" projects, where the final rendered video composition was digitally assembled from hundreds of video clips and images from the artist's data bank. The projects were subsequently shown at the Contemporary Art Museum Malaga, ARTIUM Centro-Museo Vasco de Arte Contemporáneo, included in the exhibition "En torno a lo Transparente" in coincidence with ARCO Madrid, International Contemporary Art Fair, and the LABoral Centro de Arte y Creación Industrial, Gijón, Spain.

==== Nebulas And My Other Galaxies (2008–2011) ====
Nebulas And My Other Galaxies includes Lighthouse, Cold Forest, Garden of Stones and Light Fiction; Nebulae and Light Circles were shown in Spain, Germany, Austria, England, and Scandinavia; Light Fiction made its US debut at the Kunsthalle Detroit. These installations are composed of LED-based, computer coded infinite light animations of various colors, creating pulsating, glowing nebulas that elicit a feeling of dreaming. In addition, the fiber-optic light projects Lighthouse and Cold Forest incorporated stainless steel compositions and photography, the latter of which was most recently displayed at PalmaPhoto. The projects Light Circles (2008) and Garden of Stones (2009) were based on Seamless Multi-Channel HD Video technology (© Tim White-Sobieski). "Using different light sources (LED, fiber-optics, and video projection) creates a unique visual environment where mandalas are all synchronized and unified by a single soundtrack." Both installations incorporate 16-channel video projections, high-definition synchronized video source, aluminum and stainless steel sculptures, LED-fiber-optics light objects, and light program synchronized with video.

==== Current ====
Tim White-Sobieski has just finished production on Waiting For Godot – Waiting For God (2014), a full-length feature film and photography project in homage to Samuel Beckett. The project was re-rendered as a 4-channel synchronized video installation for a museum exhibition with soundtrack by the artist and music by Henry Purcell and Giovanni Battista Pergolesi. One Hundred Years of Solitude (Cien años de soledad) after the novel by Gabriel García Márquez is currently in production and is intended to be presented as a series of 12 short films. Exhibitions and art fairs include: Frieze London, FIAC Paris, and 2015 Docks Art Fair, Lyon.

== Exhibitions ==
=== Museum exhibitions ===
Tim White-Sobieski has had major solo shows in Vejle Kunstmuseum, Vejle, Denmark; CAC Centro de Arte Contemporáneo Malága, Spain; Museo Centro de Arte de Salamanca, Domus Artium Spain. Additionally, he has been exhibited at Academy of Arts, Berlin, (Akademie der Künste), Germany; Palais de Tokyo, Paris, France; Haus der Kulturen der Welt, Berlin, Germany; Museo Nacional Centro de Arte Reina Sofía, Madrid, Spain; Stenersen Museum, Oslo, Norway; Prague National Gallery, Prague, Czech Republic; and the National Museum of Contemporary Art (Romania) (MNAC), Bucharest.

=== Exhibition spaces ===
- Almagro Space for Contemporary Art
- Basque Centre-Museum of Contemporary Art
- Museum Domus Artium 2002, Salamanca, Spain
- Kunst Raum Sylt Quelle
- Malága Center for Contemporary Art
- Nassauischer Kunstverein Wiesbaden
- Vejle Museum of Art, Vejle, Denmark
- Wilhelm Hack Museum, Ludwigshafen, Germany

== Collections ==
Tim White-Sobieski's work belongs to the collections of Aena Foundation (FUNDACIÓN AENA), Madrid, Spain; CITI Bank Collection, New York, New York; Collection of Academy of Arts, Berlin (Akademie der Künste), Germany; La Fundación Luis Seoane, A Coruña, Spain; Collezione Foundation LA GAIA, Busca, Italy; Denver Art Museum (DAM), Denver, CO; Fundación Rac (Rosón Arte Contemporáneo, Pontevedra, Spain; ING Art Collection, (Brussels, Amsterdam, London, New York); L’Oreal Collection, Paris, France; Louis Vuitton Foundation, Paris, France; Museo de Bellas Artes de Santander, SANTANDER, Spain; Museo Nacional Centro de Arte Reina Sofía (MNCARS), Madrid, Spain; Centro Galego de Arte Contemporanea, Museum of Contemporary Art CGAC, Santiago de Compostela, Spain; Museum of Contemporary Art Elgiz, Istanbul, Turkey; Museum of Contemporary Art GAM, Torino, Italy; Museum of Contemporary Photography (MoCP), Chicago, IL, USA; New York Public Library Print Collection, New York, New York; The Miriam and Ira D. Wallach Division of Art, Prints and Photographs, New York, New York; and the UBS collection of Contemporary Art, Basel, Switzerland.

== See also ==
- Experimental film
- List of video artists
- Music visualization
- New media art
- Video installation art
- Visual Music
- Video sculpture
