= Konsthall =

Konsthall is the Swedish term for a venue that hosts temporary art exhibitions (unlike a gallery or art museum which hosts a permanent collection) and may refer to:

- Bonniers Konsthall, a contemporary art venue in Stockholm; see Barnhusviken § Notable buildings
- Edsvik Konsthall, a venue for contemporary art at Edsberg, North of Stockholm
- Göteborgs Konsthall, a contemporary art hall in Gothenburg (Göteborg)
- Liljevalchs konsthall, an art venue located on Djurgården island in Stockholm
- Lunds Konsthall, a contemporary art venue in Lund
- Malmö Konsthall, an exhibition hall in Malmö
- Röda Sten Konsthall, a contemporary art centre in Gothenburg, Sweden
- Tensta Konsthall, a centre for contemporary art in the Stockholm suburb of Tensta

== See also ==
- Kunsthalle, the German term for facility that mounts temporary art exhibitions
