= Sarasota Art Museum =

Art museum in Sarasota, Florida

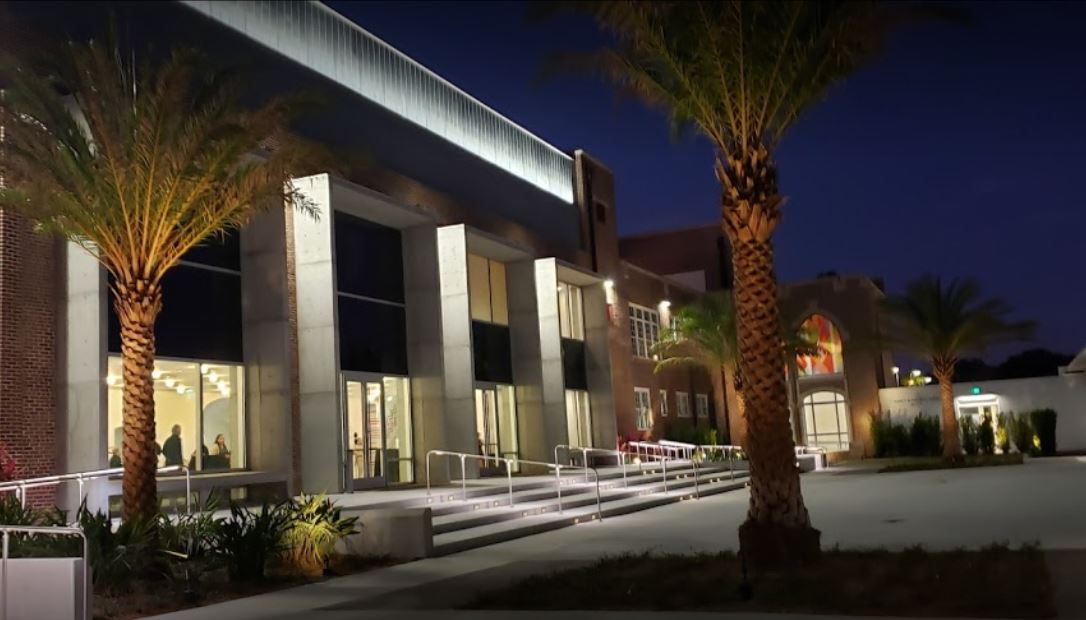

- Location within Florida
- Established: 2019
- Location: 1001 S. Tamiami Trail; Sarasota, Florida
- Coordinates: 27.32653°N 82.52946°W
- Type: Art
- Director: Virginia Shearer
- Website: www.sarasotaartmuseum.org

The Sarasota Art Museum on the Ringling College Museum Campus (SAM) officially opened to the public on December 14, 2019. Its location is the Old Sarasota High School building.

Built in 1927, the Late Gothic Revival, brick and terra cotta structure was once the city's main high school. It was designed by architect M. Leo Elliott in 1926 with the intention of setting itself apart from every other architectural feat in the city. Its exterior features brick pier buttresses and glazed terra cotta cluster columns while the interior includes Gothic Revival motifs: coats of arms, quatrefoils, and arched ceilings. The school was completed in 1927 and the first senior class graduated in 1928. The building was named to the National Register of Historic Places in 1984.

An addition to the school was added in 1960 by local architect Paul Rudolph. Rudolph was a well-known member of the Sarasota School of Architecture.

After closing to students in 1996, the building (by then known locally as the Elliott building) was shuttered for many years and left neglected. There were rumors of toxic asbestos and public uproar always followed any attempt to demolish the building. In 2003, plans began to repurpose the Elliott and Randolph buildings for use as an art museum.

The SAM was founded in partnership with Ringling College of Art and Design with the agreement that the college's Continuing Studies Program would share space with the museum's own educational efforts. Design modifications and construction was undertaken by Lawson Group Architects and architectural firm Keenan/Riley.

The SAM officially opened to the public on December 14, 2019. It is a member of the American Alliance of Museums but not yet officially accredited. The museum's current executive director is Virginia Shearer.

== The Sarasota Art Museum ==
=== Galleries ===
The museum's 15,000 square feet of exhibition space are spread across three floors. Temporary exhibitions are devoted primarily to 20th and 21st century art and artists.

=== Grounds ===
Visitors are encouraged to step outside the museum's walls into the outdoor sculpture gallery featuring temporary exhibitions.

=== Shop ===
The museum's gift shop filled with gifts, books, and jewelry is located on the first floor behind the ticket desk.

=== Bistro ===
Bistro, the museum's café, is located on the first floor of Paul Rudolph's 1959 Vocational Shops building. The space was reimagined by beautifully K/R Architects. Local produce features in gourmet sandwiches, soups, and snacks. Bistro's Executive Chef is Kaytlin Dangaran.

== Educational programming ==
The Sarasota Art Museum is home to OLLI, the Osher Lifelong Learning Institute of the Ringling College Continuing Studies Program. The program offers classes for adults in the community related to all forms of visual and liberal arts: Photography, Ceramics, Fiber Arts, Philosophy & Religion, Chamber Music, Assyrian History, etc. The museum's first floor includes several classrooms and a ceramic studio.

== Collection ==
The Sarasota Art Museum does not have a permanent collection. Rather, it is considered a kunsthalle (a contemporary art museum without a permanent collection).

Semi-permanent or site-specific installations include “The Thonet Chair”; “Vita in Motu”; “The Worker Project”; and several outdoor installations included in “On the Grounds.”
