= Numen / For Use =

Croatian-Austrian artist collective

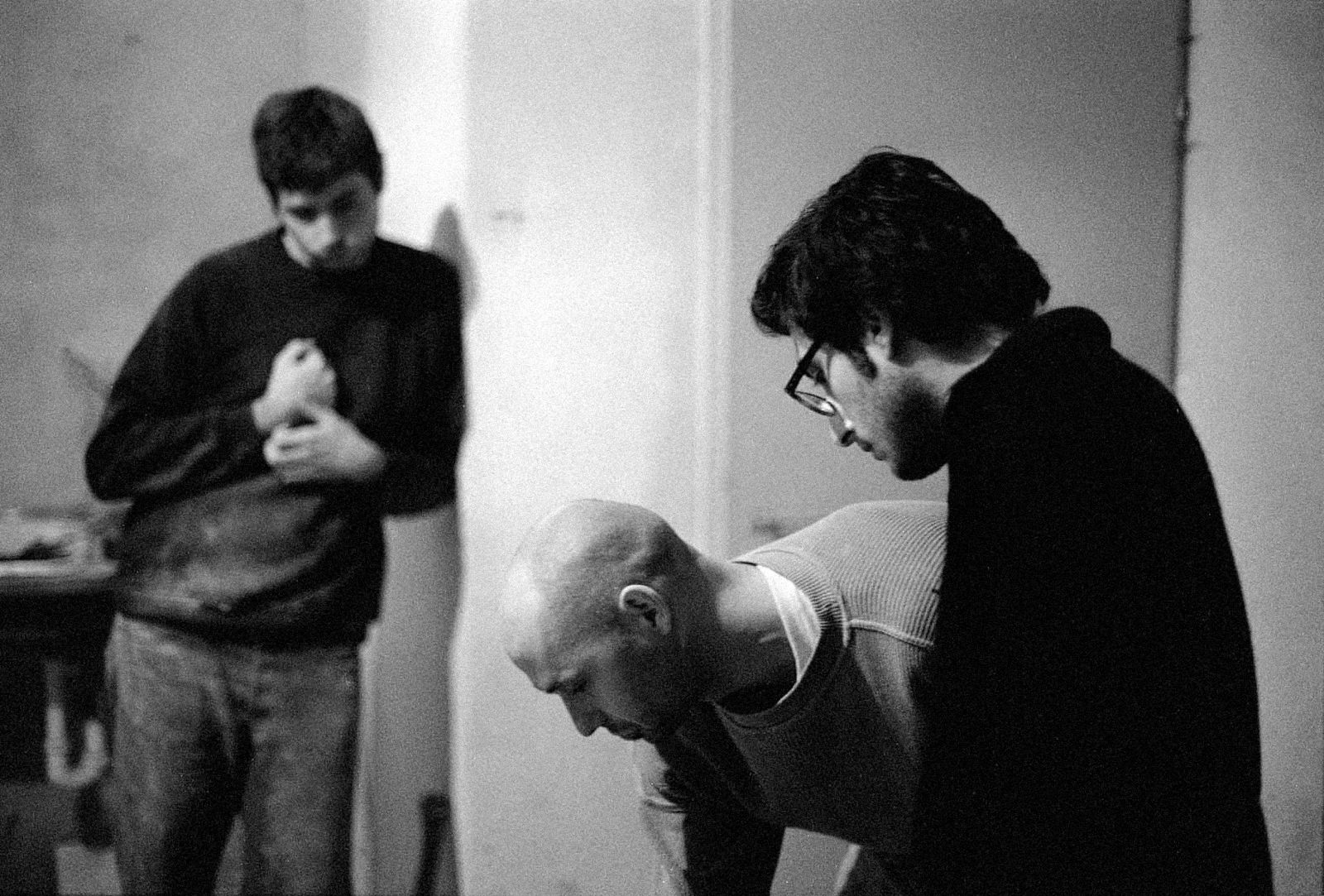
Numen / For Use group portrait, around 2005

Numen / For Use is a Croatian-Austrian artist collective founded in 1998, known for its interdisciplinary work in art installations, scenography and industrial and spatial design. The group’s artistic practice explores material systems, immersive environments, and the relationship between physical structures and human perception. Numen / For Use have exhibited internationally in museums, galleries, and public spaces, and their work has been discussed in art journals and critical reviews.

== History ==
The group initially formed in 1998 in Vienna as For Use, a product-orientated collaboration between industrial designers Sven Jonke, Christoph Katzler and Nikola Radeljković. In 1999, the collective adopted the combined name Numen / For Use to reflect an expanded scope, now encompassing conceptual projects and broader artistic interventions in exhibition design, spatial installations, and interdisciplinary design. Since then, the group has developed a very varied practice integrating material and formal experimentation, immersive environments, and site-specific interventions.

== Artistic Practice ==
In their product design practice Numen / For Use employ principles of reductive, modernist aesthetics focussing on form, function and materiality. Their artistic output encompasses scenography and production design for theatre, film and opera, and large‑scale, immersive installations in unconventional media such as adhesive tape, nets and membranes, as well as kinetic and experimental objects, closer to the domain of conceptual art. The collective is perhaps best known for their parasitic Tape, Net, Tube, String, and Tuft installations which transform ordinary spaces and materials into interactive, walk-in environments.

== Critical reception ==
Critical discussion of Numen / For Use has appeared in a variety of media articles and art and design publications (e.g. Oris, ČIP, Die Presse, ArchDaily, Novi List ). Their work was featured in magazines such as Frame, eVolo, Dezeen, Designboom, Abitare, Metalocus, Cover Mag. Critics mostly highlight the group’s hybrid opus and their ability to blur the boundaries between art, design, and architecture.

== Exhibitions ==
Numen / For Use's installation work has been shown at institutions and venues worldwide, including Palais de Tokyo (Paris), Garage Museum of Contemporary Art (Moscow), Schirn Kunsthalle Frankfurt, Spiral Gallery (Tokyo), BRUSK Museum Bruges, Ars Electronica, Danish Design Center, Design Museum London, Wattis Institute for Contemporary Arts (San Francisco), Wanås Konst Sculpture Park, Zou-no-hanna Terrace (Yokohama), Fondazione Palazzo Strozzi (Florence), Z33 (Hasselt), Des Moines Art Center, Färgfabriken (Stockholm) and Centro Cultural FIESP (São Paulo), among others.

== Scenography ==
In the past decade the collective’s activity in the field of performance—mostly in collaboration with a Croatian architect Ivana Jonke—has included major European theatre houses such as Teatro Real in Madrid, Staatsballett Berlin, Badisches Staatstheater Karlsruhe, Deutsche Staatsoper Unter den Linden Berlin, Det Norske Teatret Oslo, National Theatre Maria Guerrero Madrid, Yugoslav Drama Theatre Belgrade, Festival Internacional de Teatro Clásico de Mérida, National Theatre Budapest, National Opera Sofia, Slovene National Drama Theatre Ljubljana, Croatian National Theatre Zagreb, Slovene National Opera Maribor, Centro Cultural de la Villa Madrid and Cullberg Dance Company Stockholm, among others.

== Product Design ==
Numen / For Use have maintained a consistent focus on industrial and furniture design alongside their broader artistic and scenographic work. In their early years (primarily 1998–2010), under the initial For Use banner and continuing as Numen / For Use, they created furniture and objects for several prominent Italian and German manufacturers, including Cappellini, Moroso, MDF Italia, Zanotta, ClassiCon, L'Abbate, Magis, and Interlübke. Notable pieces from this period include the Transform seating system (Moroso, 2005), Twist (Moroso, 2007), YY chair (Moroso, 2011), and various designs for Cappellini and MDF Italia in the early 2000s. In 2005, they founded Element, a Croatian furniture brand emphasizing elementary, minimalist, solid oak pieces, produced in a joint partnership with a local retailer. During the past decade, the collective has developed a long-term collaboration with the Croatian designer furniture brand Prostoria, producing a wide range of characteristic designs. Key pieces for Prostoria include Buffa, Rei, Oblique and Trifidae collections, Polygon and Toggle easy chairs, Revolve sofa bed, Bik and Dobra chairs, Absent and Layout sofas, Avet low table, and outdoor collections Osmo and Jugo.

== Spatial Design ==
In addition to their installations and scenography, Numen / For Use have engaged in spatial design projects, often in collaboration with architects, focusing on public realms and hospitality interiors. Notable works include the redesign of the Split Waterfront (Riva), a 250-meter-long public promenade in front of Diocletian's Palace, realized in 2007 with the architectural studio 3LHD, emphasizing contemporary urban equipment in contrast with the historic context. They also designed the interior of Hotel Lone in Rovinj (2011), again partnering with 3LHD. Another key project is the interior of Hotel Osmoliš in Brsečine near Dubrovnik (2021) designed by Damir Vitković, done in collaboration with architects Vanja Magić and Ivana Jonke. Other public realm interventions include Poljana Square in Šibenik (2020), showcasing their approach to site-specific urban transformations.

== Awards and Recognition ==
Parallel to their publicly exhibited work, the collective has won many prestigious design awards for both industrial and spatial design and scenography, including recognition at design festivals and professional competitions, such as; The Brit Insurance Award London, The Design Award at DMY Berlin, two gold medals at Prague Quadrennial of Performance Design and Space, two Borštnikov scenography awards, two Red Dot Awards for product design and German Design Council Award.
