= Nonotak =

NONOTAK, also known as Nonotak Studio, is a collaborative installation and performance project founded by visual artist Noemi Schipfer and architect-musician Takami Nakamoto that was conceived in 2011 with a commission from architect Bigoni-Mortemard to create a mural in the lobby of a public housing building in Paris. Nonotak works with light & sound installations and performance pieces to create ethereal, immersive and dreamlike environments which are built to envelop, challenge and stagger the viewer capitalising on Nakamoto's approach to space & sound and Schipfer's experience with kinetic visual and complex, geometric illustrations. Nonotak are also known for using custom built technology in many of their pieces as well as using conventional technology in unconventional ways to generate a certain desired effect.

Nonotak's installation piece Daydream V2 was nominated for the Prix Cube in 2013 and they were awarded the Art Directors Club of New York (ADC) Young Guns award in 2016. Nonotak were also selected as part of Forbes 2016 30 Under 30 Europe for the Arts.

In 2013, Nakamoto and Schipfer collaborated with Hermès on a window display named Light Excursions shown at Hermès Istanbul as well as an expanded version at the new Hermès flagship in Galeries Lafayette Paris. In June 2016, Nonotak conceived Hoshi, their largest piece to date. Presented by Vice Media publication The Creators Project and Toyota, the piece was showcased at one off presentations in New York, Chicago and Los Angeles. A variation of the piece Highline was shown at Day For Night in Houston later that year along with the projector based performance piece Shiro. Hoshi was also showcased in DJ Snake music video for his hit song "The Half" directed by Director X and that featured appearances by Young Thug, Swizz Beatz and Jeremih alongside DJ Snake.

In 2017 Nonotak collaborated with British film maker Sean Ellis and Stella McCartney on a short film that featured actor Cillian Murphy and music by Paul McCartney filmed over a single night in a forest outside London.

Since the inception of the project, Nonotak have performed and shown pieces at Tate Britain, Sónar Barcelona, Sónar Istanbul, TaicoClub, CTM Festival, Day For Night, STRP Biennial, Melbourne Music Week, Jerusalem Light Festival, MUTEK Montreal, MUTEK Mexico, MUTEK Colombia, Reuse Kuwait, TodaysArt, Roppongi Art Night, Mapping Festival, Act Festival Korea, Notte Biancha and many more. The New York Times recently rated Nonotak performance piece Shiro as one of the top 15 performances of Sónar Barcelona 2017.

Schipfer is also a tattoo artist.
