= Lightpainting =

Art form

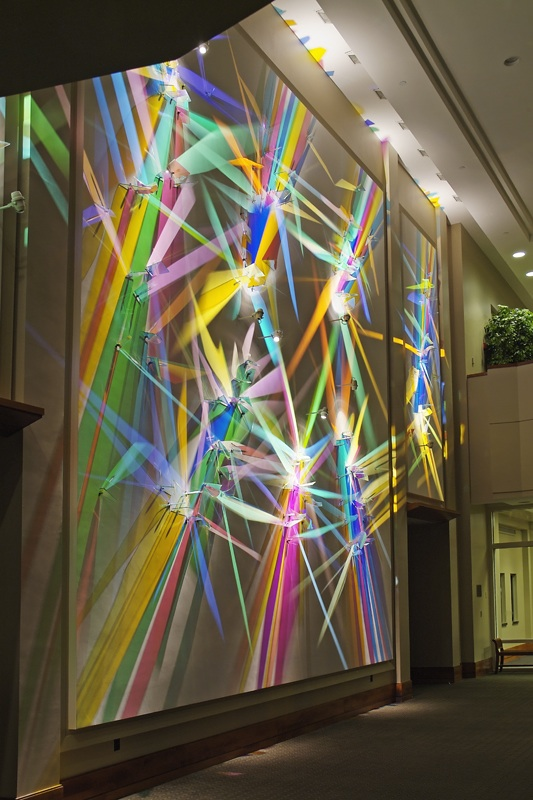
Stephen Knapp's installation First Symphony (2006) at Ball State University in Muncie, Indiana, is an example of the lightpainting medium, which the artist developed.

Lightpainting is an art form developed by artist Stephen Knapp and introduced in 2002. Lightpainting uses white light projected in space through specially coated glass that breaks the light into bands of color, producing optically complex virtual 3D images that sit at the intersection of painting and sculpture.

Lightpaintings can take the form of moveable wall-mounted panels but the most spectacular effects are achieved in large-scale architectural installations. Layers of metallic coating are applied to glass pieces to refract and reflect colors, which becomes the palette to be used as pure chroma or mixed into a wide spectrum of colors. Glass is cut into various sizes and shapes that determine planes of color and other elements that can be used much as in traditional painting or sculpture.

Lightpainting (one word) is not to be confused with light painting (two words), the latter of which is a photographic process recording traces of light on film or digital media to create images that must be reproduced in printed or transparency form.
