= Centre for International Light Art =

Centre for International Light Art (CILA)
- Zentrum für Internationale Lichtkunst
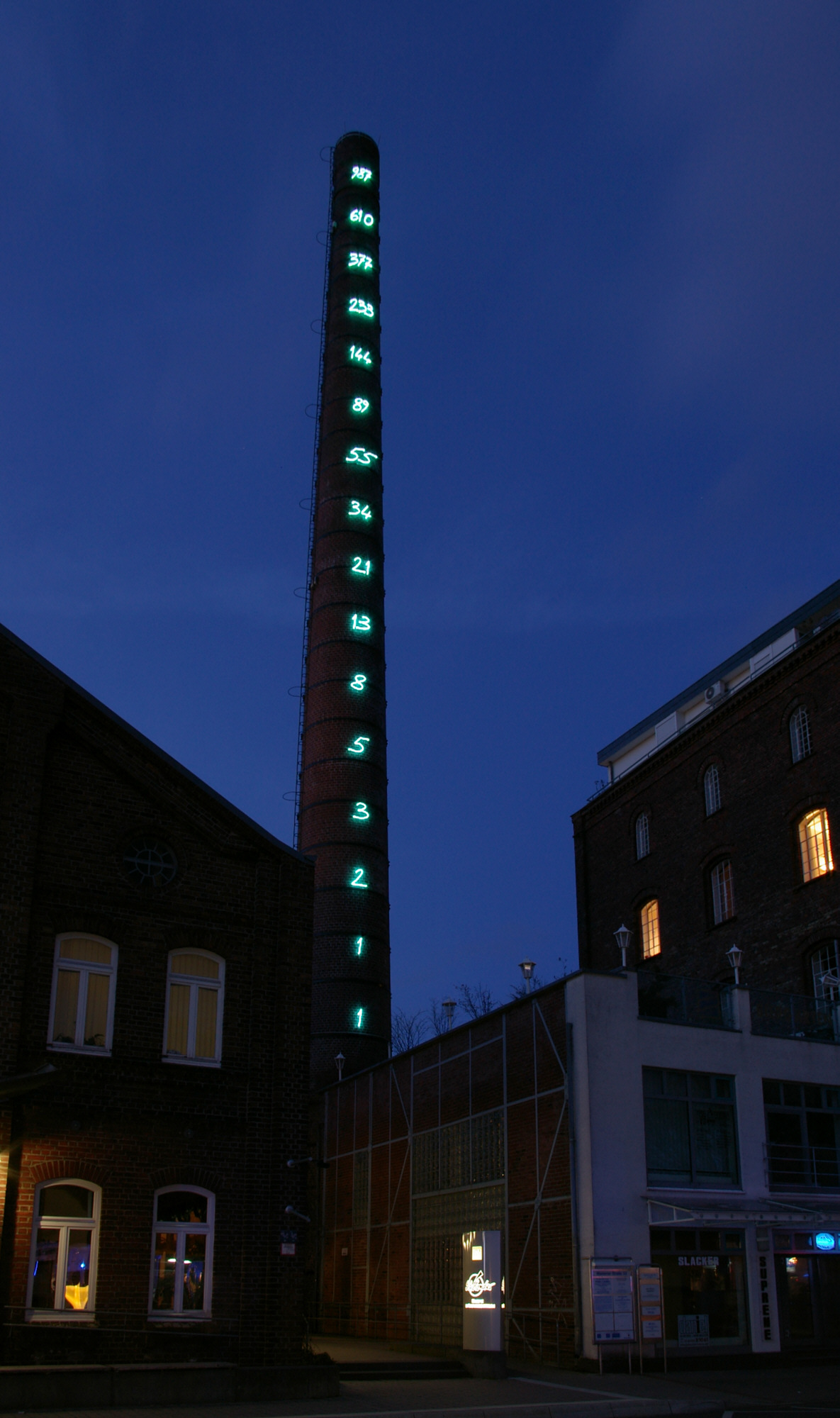
- The CILA's landmark: installation of Fibonacci numbers by Mario Merz

- Location of the Centre for International Light Art in Germany
- Established: 2002
- Location: Lindenplatz 1, 59423 Unna, Germany
- Coordinates: 51°32′04″N 7°41′08″E
- Type: Art museum
- Key holdings: James Turrell, Keith Sonnier, Mario Merz
- Collections: Light art
- Director: John Jaspers
- Public transit access: Bus: Lindenplatz
- Parking: Adjacent to the building
- Website: www.lichtkunst-unna.de

The Centre for International Light Art (CILA, German: Zentrum für Internationale Lichtkunst) is an art museum in Unna, Germany. It is the world's only museum which is exclusively dedicated to the collection and presentation of light art.

== Collection and exhibitions ==
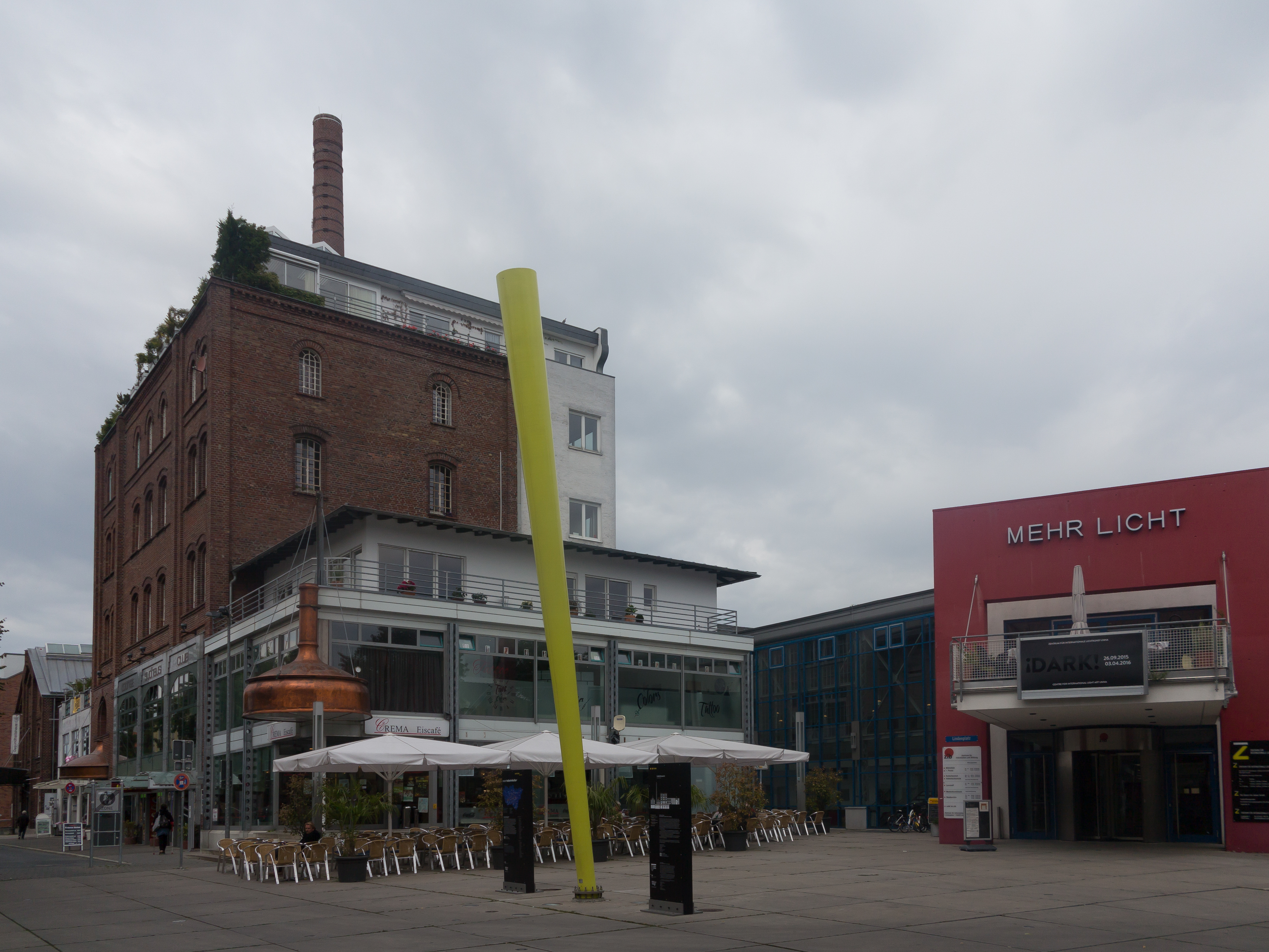
Centre for International Light Art

The museum's permanent exhibition shows works by twelve internationally renowned light artists: James Turrell, Keith Sonnier, Mario Merz, Joseph Kosuth, Mischa Kuball, Rebecca Horn, Christina Kubisch, Jan van Munster, François Morellet, Christian Boltanski, Brigitte Kowanz and Olafur Eliasson.

Since 2009, the artwork Third Breath, 2005 by American light artist James Turrell is part of the permanent exhibition. It is a camera obscura, consisting of two rooms. In the lower, cubic room (Camera Obscura Space), the visitor sees an image of the sky which is being reflected through a lens on the ground. In the upper, cylindrical room (Sky Space), the sky can be seen directly through a hole in the ceiling. The opening of the artwork was accompanied by the four-month exhibition James Turrell - Geometry of Light.

The current temporary exhibition MORELLET shows the last exhibition of works by François Morellet which has been curated by the artist himself, shortly before his death in May 2016. In 2014, the temporary exhibition was Jan van Munster - L ich T (2014). The temporary exhibition ¡DARK! + Dark II (two, too) in 2015/2016 showed works by Anthony McCall, Diana Ramaekers, Regine Schumann, Vera Röhm, and Lucinda Devlin.

In addition to the permanent and temporary exhibitions, the center organizes conferences, symposia and workshops, and serves as a forum for discussions. The CILA is a major part of the regional cultural project Hellweg - Ein Lichtweg (Hellweg - A Way of Light), which links light art projects along the historical Westphalian Hellweg travel route. Within a distance of only a few miles around the CILA, works by Rosemarie Trockel, Kazuo Katase, Michael Batz, Claudia Wissmann, and Jan Philip Scheibe are shown.

== Architecture ==
The CILA is located at the heart of the city of Unna, in the former Linden brewery, a red brick industrial building complex dating from the 19th century. Its landmark is an installation of Fibonacci numbers by Italian artist Mario Merz. The light art installations are integrated into the industrial structures of the brewery's former cellar vaults.

== Selected exhibitions ==
- 2016/2017: MORELLET, a retrospective of works by François Morellet.
- 2016: Switch with Marion Cziba, Raika Dittmann, Martin Fell, Nicole Fleisch, Karen Fritz, Daniel Hausig, Ida Kammerloch, Octavian Mariutiu, Maria Elena Schmidt, Michael Voigt, and Ingo Wendt
- 2015/2016: Dark with Anthony McCall, Diana Ramaekers, Regine Schumann, Vera Röhm, and Lucinda Devlin
- 2013: Words Don't Come Easily with Boris Petrovsky, Tsang Kin-Wah, Raqs Media Collective, and Jason Rhoades
