= Bob Vila =

American home improvement television host (born 1946)

- Born: Robert Joseph Vila; June 20, 1946 (age 80); Miami, Florida, U.S.
- Education: University of Florida
- Occupations: Television host entrepreneur
- Years active: 1979–present
- Spouse: Diana Barrett (m. 1975)
- Children: 3
- Website: bobvila.com

Robert Joseph Vila (born June 20, 1946) is an American home improvement television show host known for This Old House (1979–1989), Bob Vila's Home Again (1990–2005), and Bob Vila (2005–2007).

== Early life and education ==
Vila, a Cuban-American, is a native of Miami, Florida. When Vila was a child, his father built the family home by hand. Vila graduated from Miami Jackson High School and studied journalism at the University of Florida. After graduating in 1969, he served as a volunteer in the Peace Corps, working in Panama in the late 1960s. He then went to Europe for two years to study and travel, before returning to the US and enrolling at the Boston Architectural Center.

== Career ==
Vila was hired as the host of This Old House in 1979, after receiving the "Heritage House of 1978" award by Better Homes and Gardens for his restoration of a Victorian Italianate house in Newton, Massachusetts. On This Old House, Vila appeared with carpenter Norm Abram as they and others renovated houses. In 1989, he left the show following a disagreement arising from his involvement with outside commercial endorsements for New Jersey–based Rickel Home Centers, and the subsequent retaliatory pulling of underwriting by Rickel's competitor, Home Depot, and lumber supplier Weyerhaeuser. He was replaced by Steve Thomas.

After leaving This Old House, Vila began hosting Bob Vila's Home Again (renamed to simply Bob Vila in 2005), a weekly syndicated home-improvement program. His series ran for 16 seasons in syndication before it was canceled by distributor CBS Television Distribution due to declining ratings; the series remains in reruns and on the Pluto TV streaming service. His relationship with Rickel was also short-lived, as he was signed to an endorsement deal with Sears in 1990 to pitch their line of Craftsman tools; the relationship ended acrimoniously in 2006 following a lawsuit settlement.

Vila also appeared on three episodes of the situation comedy Home Improvement during 1992 and 1993 as himself on Tool Time, a fictional show within the sitcom, where main character and cable TV host Tim Taylor (played by Tim Allen) saw him as a rival, and made futile attempts to outdo Vila. Contrary to Home Improvement, when Allen was interviewed by Nintendo Power and asked if he could make a video game, Allen proposed one about aspects of carpentry, and the end scene would be the player being featured on Bob Vila's Home Again. In truth, Allen would return the favor by appearing on Home Again with a home improvement project of his own in Beverly Hills, Michigan.

Vila made a cameo in the 1993 comedy spoof Hot Shots! Part Deux.

Vila has written 10 books, including a five-book series titled Bob Vila's Guide to Historic Homes of America.

Vila has appeared on the Home Shopping Network selling a range of tools under his own name brand that he founded in 2016.

== Other productions ==
Bob Vila's less widely known productions include: Guide to Historic Homes of America (1996), In Search of Palladio (1996) for A&E, and Restore America for HGTV.

=== Guide to Historic Homes of America ===
The Guide to Historic Homes of America (1996) includes two-hour segments on each of four major regions of the United States: the Northeast (including New England and the Mid-Atlantic States), the South, the Midwest, and the West.

==== The Northeast ====
- Morris–Jumel Mansion overlooking the Polo Grounds in Washington Heights, Manhattan.
- Dyckman House on Broadway in Upper Manhattan.
- Hancock Shaker Village in western Massachusetts.
- Strawbery Banke restoration in Portsmouth, New Hampshire.
- Olana – "a palatial amalgam of Middle Eastern and European influences"

==== The Mid-Atlantic States ====
- Chesapeake Bay and Annapolis, Maryland – William Paca House and Hammond–Harwood House.
- New Castle, Delaware – George Read, Jr. House, built by the son of George Read.
- Baltimore, Maryland – Homewood House on the Johns Hopkins University Homewood campus.
- Washington, D.C. – Decatur House on President's Park and Tudor Place in Georgetown.

==== The South ====
- Thomas Jefferson
  - University of Virginia – ten residential pavilions surround the great, terraced Lawn.
  - Ash Lawn–Highland.
  - Poplar Forest – octagonal house filmed while undergoing complete restoration.
  - Monticello – includes Dome Room at top of building (not open to the public) and Honeymoon Cottage.
- Natchez, Mississippi
  - House on Endicott Hill – early trader's house.
  - Rosalie – Federal architecture mansion with John Henry Belter furniture and a panoramic view of Mississippi River.
  - Stanton Hall – "perhaps the grandest Greek Revival house anywhere." Designed by Captain Thomas Rose.
  - Longwood – begun in 1860 by Samuel Sloan. Never finished; construction halted in April 1861.
- Texarkana, Texas – the Ace of Clubs House.

==== The Midwest and West ====
- Ellwood House – built by barbed wire entrepreneur Isaac L. Ellwood in DeKalb, Illinois.
- Frank Lloyd Wright
  - Dana-Thomas House – Prairie School style home in Springfield, Illinois. Quoted as being "richer in detail than any other Wright home."
  - Fallingwater – Organically designed residence that draws heavily upon inspiration from Japanese architecture. Located in the Laurel Highlands near Pittsburgh.
- Cooper–Molera Adobe – early Spanish Colonial owned by the National Trust for Historic Preservation in Monterey State Historic Park.
- Filoli – Georgian home designed by Willis Polk; located in Woodside, California on the eastern slopes of the Santa Cruz Mountains.
- Tor House – stone house and tower overlooking the Pacific Ocean at Carmel-by-the-Sea, California; built by Robinson Jeffers.

=== In Search of Palladio ===
In Search of Palladio (1996) is a three-part, six-hour study of the work and lasting influence of the 16th-century architect Andrea Palladio. Palladio designed various types of buildings, but the series concentrates on his domestic architecture. (see also: Palladian Villas of the Veneto).

==== I. Villas of the Veneto ====
- Villa Giustinian, Roncade – For Vila, this building (not by Palladio) provided the context for Palladio's innovative thinking – gothic battlements, portcullis, and stone walls that concealed a Renaissance palace and farm buildings.
- Villa Pisani in Montagnana – a descendant of the original owners served as Vila's guide.
- Villa Cornaro – A suburban villa on a town street, a palatial residence which was also an on-site place of business for running a large farming enterprise.
- Villa Barbaro.
- Villa Emo – For Vila this is "perhaps the most dramatic farmhouse ever built".
- La Rocca Pisana – spectacular hilltop belvedere by Palladio's pupil Vincenzo Scamozzi.

II. The Palladians in England and Ireland

- London: Chiswick House, Marble Hill House and Stourhead.
- Bath, Somerset: Queen Square, The Circus and the Royal Crescent.
- Ireland: Casino at Marino – "the architectural equivalent of a Fabergé egg".
- Northern Ireland: Castle Ward – overlooking Strangford Lough with both Palladian and Gothic facades and interiors.

III. The Palladian Legacy in America

- Philadelphia, Pennsylvania: Mount Pleasant.
- Marblehead and Waltham, Massachusetts: Jeremiah Lee Mansion and Gore Place
- Hudson Valley, New York: Boscobel House Museum – purchased in 1955 for thirty-five dollars. Meticulously restored, situated on a bluff on the east bank of the Hudson River opposite the United States Military Academy at West Point.
- Hartford, Connecticut: Austin House – built for Wadsworth Atheneum director Arthur Everett Austin, Jr.
- South Bend, Indiana. In Indiana, Vila looks at University of Notre Dame architectural school "where Palladio and classical architecture are taken seriously indeed", Vitruvian House designed by Thomas Gordon Smith and Villa Indiana designed by Duncan G. Stroik.

=== Restore America ===
Restore America consists of 50 one-hour segments which explore historic preservation and building restoration in each of the fifty U.S. states. Anticipating the turn of the 3rd millennium, it was first broadcast on HGTV between July 4, 1999, and July 4, 2000.

== Bibliography ==
Bob Vila has written over two dozen books, which include:

- 1980: This Old House: Restoring, Rehabilitating, and Renovating an Older House. Boston: Little, Brown. ISBN 0-316-17704-0.
- 1990: Bob Vila's Guide to Buying Your Dream House. Boston: Little, Brown. ISBN 0-316-90291-8.
- 1993–1994: Bob Vila's Guides to Historic Homes of America. New York City: Quill (HarperCollins imprint).
  - Historic Homes of New England. ISBN 0-688-12493-3.
  - Historic Homes of the South. ISBN 0-688-12492-5.
  - Historic Homes of the Midwest and Great Plains. ISBN 0-688-12495-X.
  - Historic Homes of the West. ISBN 0-688-12496-8.
  - Historic Homes of the Mid-Atlantic. ISBN 0-688-12494-1.

== See also ==
- List of Cuban Americans
