= Diana Barrett =

President and founder of the Fledgling Fund

- Born: Diana Herran; 1944 or 1945 (age 80–81); Mexico
- Education: Harvard Business School
- Spouse: Bob Vila (m. 1975)
- Children: 3

Diana Barrett (born 1944 or 1945) is an American philanthropist and former business professor. She is married to television host Bob Vila.

== Personal life ==
Barrett was born in 1944 or 1945 in Mexico, as Diana Herran. As an infant, she was infected with polio and therefore unable to walk until she was six; she continued to wear braces until she was a teenager. Her family is Hispanic and wealthy (her stepfather was an investment banker in New York).

Barrett attended Sweet Briar College in the 1960s, and Harvard in the 1970s. After divorcing her first husband, she decided to choose a new surname, and picked Barrett from a New York City phone directory.

She met Bob Vila in the mid-1970s and the two became business partners, consulting on renovating old homes. The couple married in October 1975, and have a son and two daughters.

== Career ==
Barrett is the president and founder of the Fledgling Fund, a philanthropic organization that supports documentary films that have a social impact. She founded the organization in 2005 with money from her father, investment banker Joseph King (1902–1980). Recipients of grants from the fund have won four Emmy Awards and four Academy Awards.

She is also a member of the Peabody Awards board of directors, which is presented by the University of Georgia's Henry W. Grady College of Journalism and Mass Communication. For her work supporting documentaries and educational campaigns on social issues, and her continued work as a senior citizen herself, Barrett was a 2009 encore.org Purpose Prize fellow.

Prior to moving into philanthropy, she had been a faculty-member at Harvard University for 25 years, teaching classes in the Business School and School of Public Health.
