= Wadsworth Atheneum =

Art museum in Hartford, Connecticut

- Established: 1844; 182 years ago
- Location: 600 Main Street, Hartford, Connecticut, U.S.
- Type: Art museum
- Director: Matthew Hargraves
- CEO: Allison Blais
- Public transit access: 61, 63, 69
- Website: thewadsworth.org
- Wadsworth Atheneum
- U.S. National Register of Historic Places
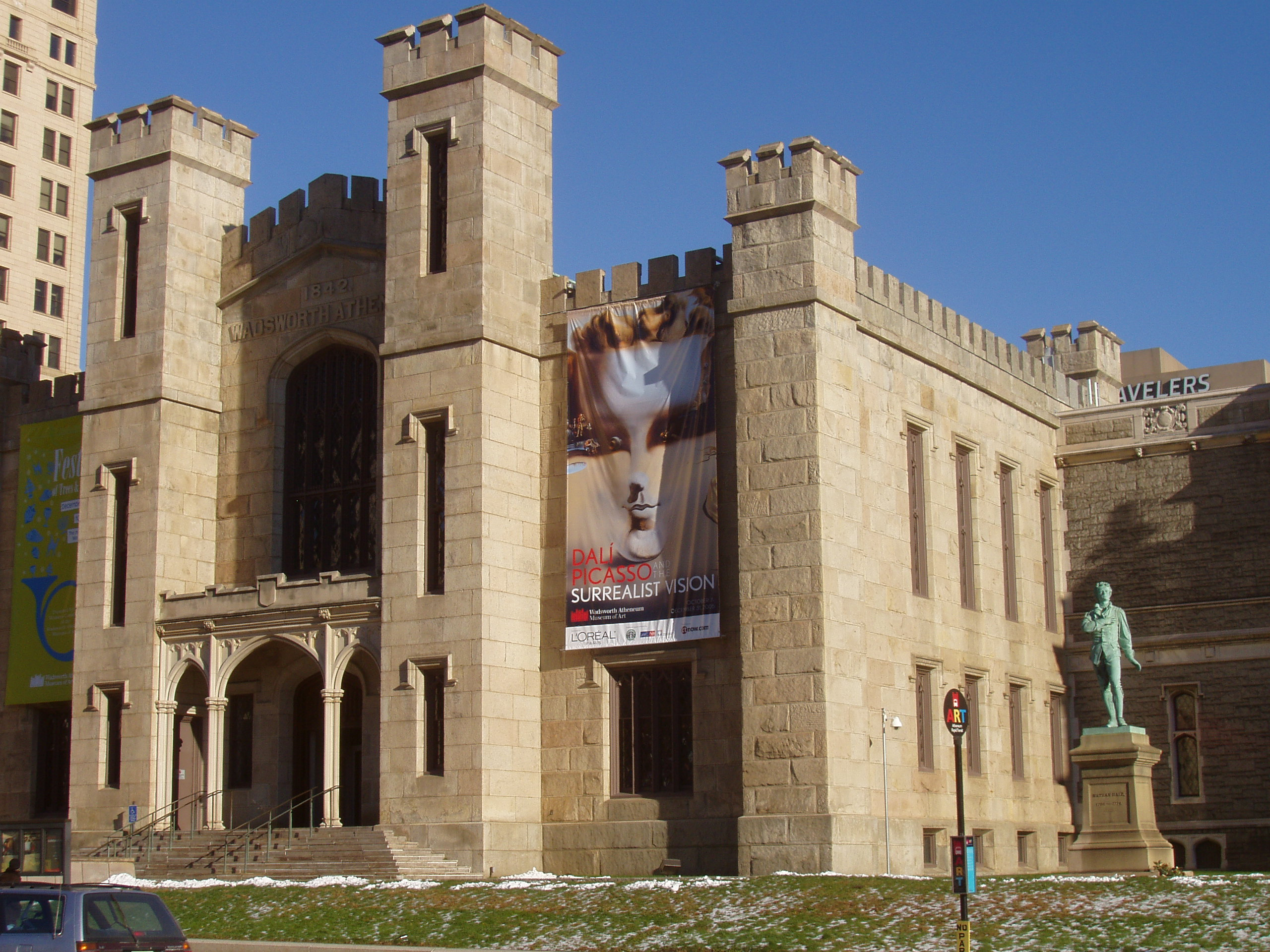
- Wadsworth Atheneum

- Location within Connecticut Location within the United States
- Location: 25 Atheneum Square Hartford, Connecticut, U.S.
- Coordinates: 41°45′48″N 72°40′26″W
- Built: 1842 – July 31, 1844
- Architects: Alexander Jackson Davis and Ithiel Town
- Architectural style: Gothic Revival
- NRHP reference No.: 70000709
- Added to NRHP: October 6, 1970

The Wadsworth Atheneum is an art museum in Hartford, Connecticut. The Wadsworth is noted for its collections of European Baroque art, ancient Egyptian and Classical bronzes, French and American Impressionist paintings, Hudson River School landscapes, modernist masterpieces and contemporary works, as well as collections of early American furniture and decorative arts.

Founded in 1842 and opened in 1844, it is the oldest continually operating public art museum in the United States.

The museum is located at 600 Main Street in a distinctive castle-like building in downtown Hartford, Connecticut, the state's capital. With 75,000 square feet (7,000 m^{2}) of exhibition space, the museum is the largest art museum in the state of Connecticut. It was listed on the National Register of Historic Places in 1970.

The museum is a member of the North American Reciprocal Museums program.

== Museum history ==
=== Namesake ===
The Wadsworth, as it is most commonly known, was constructed on the site of the family home of Daniel Wadsworth in the heart of downtown Hartford. Its architects were Alexander Jackson Davis and Ithiel Town, who designed the "castle" that is the Atheneum's oldest building. Construction began in 1842 after the museum was incorporated on June 1 of that year. The museum opened on July 31, 1844, and has operated continuously since then.

The Wadsworth family, being one of the oldest and most affluent in the city, contributed numerous valuable pieces of art to be displayed at the time the museum opened. The first collection consisted of 78 paintings, two marble busts, one portrait miniature, and one bronze sculpture. In addition to the fine arts collection, the original building housed the forerunners of the Hartford Public Library and Connecticut Historical Society, giving rise to the name "Atheneum", an institution broadly devoted to culture and learning. In light of that public role, the Wadsworth has, since its founding, played host to a wide variety of cultural and community activities, including dramatic and dance performances, exhibits of historical artifacts, social functions, and benefits.

=== Modern history ===
Building on the Wadsworth family's largess, generations of more recent donors have added to the museum's collections and resources. Foremost among them are Elizabeth Jarvis Colt, widow of firearms magnate Samuel Colt, and financier and Hartford native John Pierpont Morgan. They each contributed more than 1,000 objects to the museum's collections, the former a significant group of Hudson River School landscapes and the Colt firearms collection, the latter an assemblage of priceless Renaissance decorative arts and Colonial-era American furniture. Samuel P. Avery donated works ranging from a Babylonian clay tablet to Chinese Qing Dynasty porcelain and mid-19th century French sculpture, as well as funds for new construction, producing the country's first museum interior designed in the International Style.

In 1927, the museum received a million-dollar bequest (about $20 million today in inflation-adjusted terms) from banker Frank Sumner, establishing an acquisitions endowment. In the hands of forward-thinking museum directors, particularly A. Everett 'Chick' Austin and Charles Cunningham, the fund has enabled the purchase of major works by masters including Caravaggio, Dalí, Gauguin, Miró, Strozzi, Tintoretto, Van Dyck, and Zurbarán.

In the 1940s and 1950s, bequests by Clara Hinton Gould and Anne Parrish Titzell enriched the museum's holdings of Hudson River School and Impressionist paintings, with celebrated pieces by Church, Cole, Gifford, Monet, and Renoir entering the collection. In the same period, artwork and funds bequeathed to the museum by Henry Schnakenberg led to the acquisition of a group of Cypriot, Egyptian, and Greek antiquities as well as paintings by modernists including Peter Blume, Stuart Davis, and Reginald Marsh. It was also in the 1940s that the museum became the haunt of Marguerite Yourcenar as she wrote the Memoirs of Hadrian.

In 1973, Mierle Ukeles cleaned the steps of the museum's entrance, as part of the all-female art exhibition c.7500, curated by Lucy Lippard.

The post-war and contemporary division has benefited from the generosity of Tony Smith and Susan Morse Hilles, whose gifts include groundbreaking works by Josef Albers, Jackson Pollock, Barnett Newman, Robert Rauschenberg, and Mark Rothko. With funds given by the Archibald, Goodwin, Keney, and Smith families, and by Alexander Goldfarb and Charles Schwartz, the museum has acquired valuable pieces by Alexander Calder, Artemisia Gentileschi, Cindy Sherman, Bill Viola, and Kara Walker. A 2004 gift of 125 photographs from Janice and Mickey Cartin Collection includes works by On Kawara, Ed Ruscha, Hans-Peter Feldmann, Arnold Odermatt, Lucinda Devlin, Joe Ovelman, Jonathan Monk, Frank Breuer, Malick Sidibé, and more.

In 2001, the museum announced a large-scale $100 million expansion designed by the Amsterdam-based architects UNStudio; the architects were chosen from a short list of innovative design teams, including Zaha Hadid, Thom Mayne, and Brad Cloepfil. The design required demolishing the Goodwin Building, put up in 1969, and enclosing the Avery Courtyard. However, the proposal was scrapped in 2003 due to fundraising difficulties and changes in the museum's leadership. A later plan to expand into the former Hartford Times building was also abandoned due to cost concerns. In March 2010, the museum announced the start of a comprehensive renovation project across all five of the museum's buildings, which at completion resulted in the addition of 16,000 square feet (1,500 m^{2}) of refurbished gallery space and the complete reinstallation of the museum's permanent collections of European art, European decorative arts, and contemporary art. The $33 million renovation, designed by the Hartford-based architecture firm Smith Edwards McCoy, was completed in 2015, garnering praise from local and national art critics.

== Structure and contents ==
The structure itself consists of the original, castle-like building, plus four wings that have been added during the intervening years, in styles ranging from Tudor Revival and Renaissance Revival to International. The museum is home to approximately 50,000 objects, including ancient Roman, Greek, and Egyptian bronzes; paintings from the Renaissance, Baroque, and French and American Impressionist eras, among others; 18th-century German and French porcelains (including Meissen and Sèvres); Hudson River School landscapes; early American clothing and decorations; early African-American art and historical artifacts; and more. The collections span more than 5,000 years of world history.

The Atheneum currently (through March 14, 2027) hosts a traveling exhibit of 60 works from the Museo de Arte de Ponce, in Puerto Rico, including Flaming June, considered Sir Frederic Leighton's crowning work.

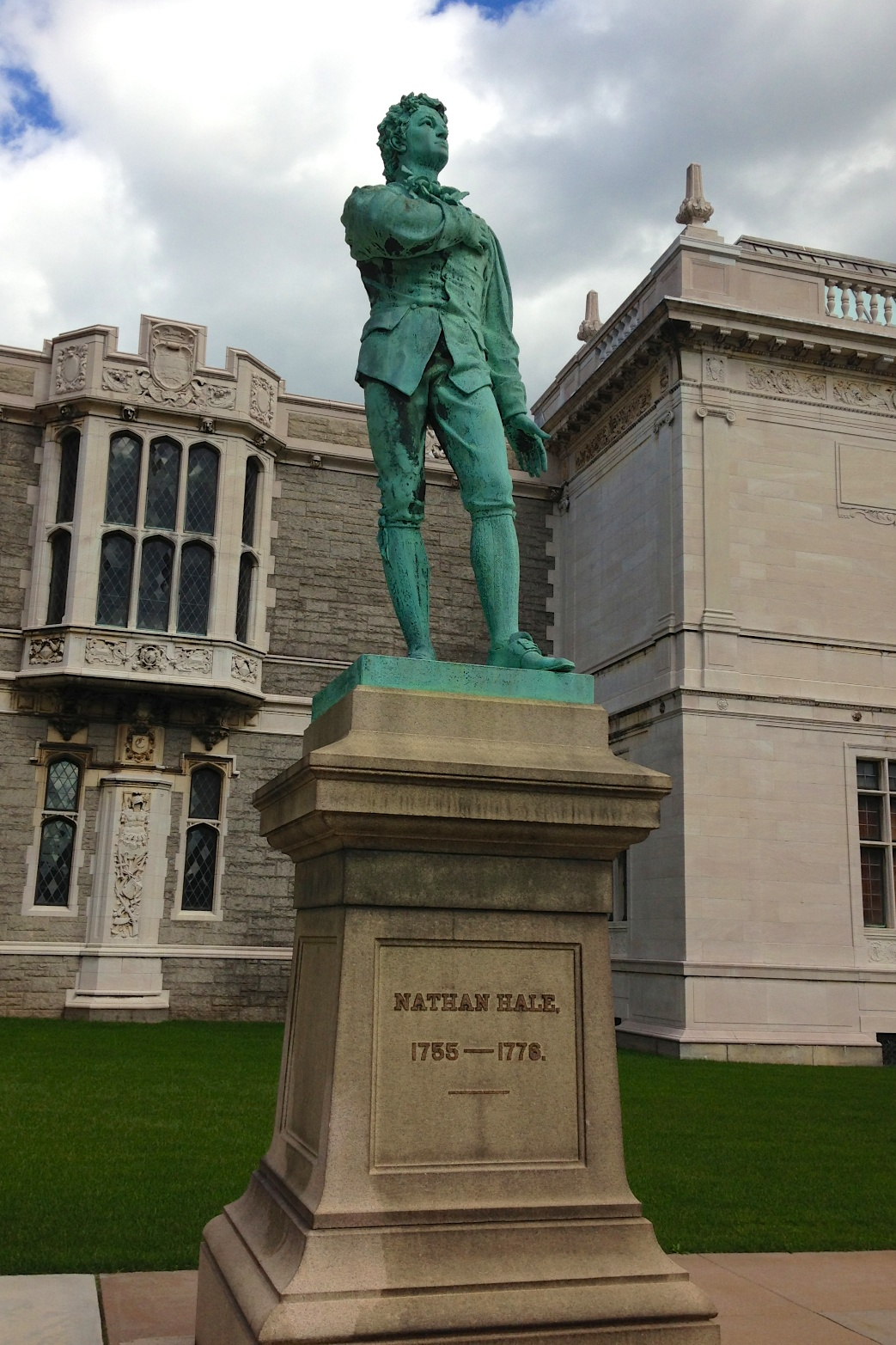
Nathan Hale, statue by Enoch Smith Woods, 1889

Just outside the "castle" is an 1899 statue of Nathan Hale, by Enoch S. Woods. A short distance away, within the Connecticut State Capitol is another, better-known sculpture of Hale by Bela Pratt, a copy of his original at Yale University.

The Atheneum also owns the A. Everett Austin House, a National Historic Landmark and home of one of the museum's most distinguished directors. The house, located in Hartford's historic West End, is open to the public as a museum.

== Museum firsts ==
Since its beginning, the Wadsworth has had a long tradition of "firsts".

In 1933, the Wadsworth sponsored George Balanchine's immigration to the United States from the Soviet Union. Shortly after his immigration, Balanchine founded the School of American Ballet, which led to the formation of the New York City Ballet. He then chose to have the Producing Company of the School of American Ballet's first performances at the Avery Memorial Theatre of Wadsworth in December 1934, including his first ballet choreographed in America, Serenade.

The museum was the first in America to acquire pieces by Salvador Dalí, Balthus, Frederic Church, Michelangelo Merisi da Caravaggio, Piet Mondrian, and many other famous artists. Under the directorship of Arthur Everett Austin, Jr., the first American exhibition of surrealism was shown at the Wadsworth in 1931, and the first major U.S. Pablo Picasso retrospective was held in 1934. Also in 1934, the world premiere of the opera Four Saints in Three Acts by Gertrude Stein and Virgil Thomson was held at the Atheneum.

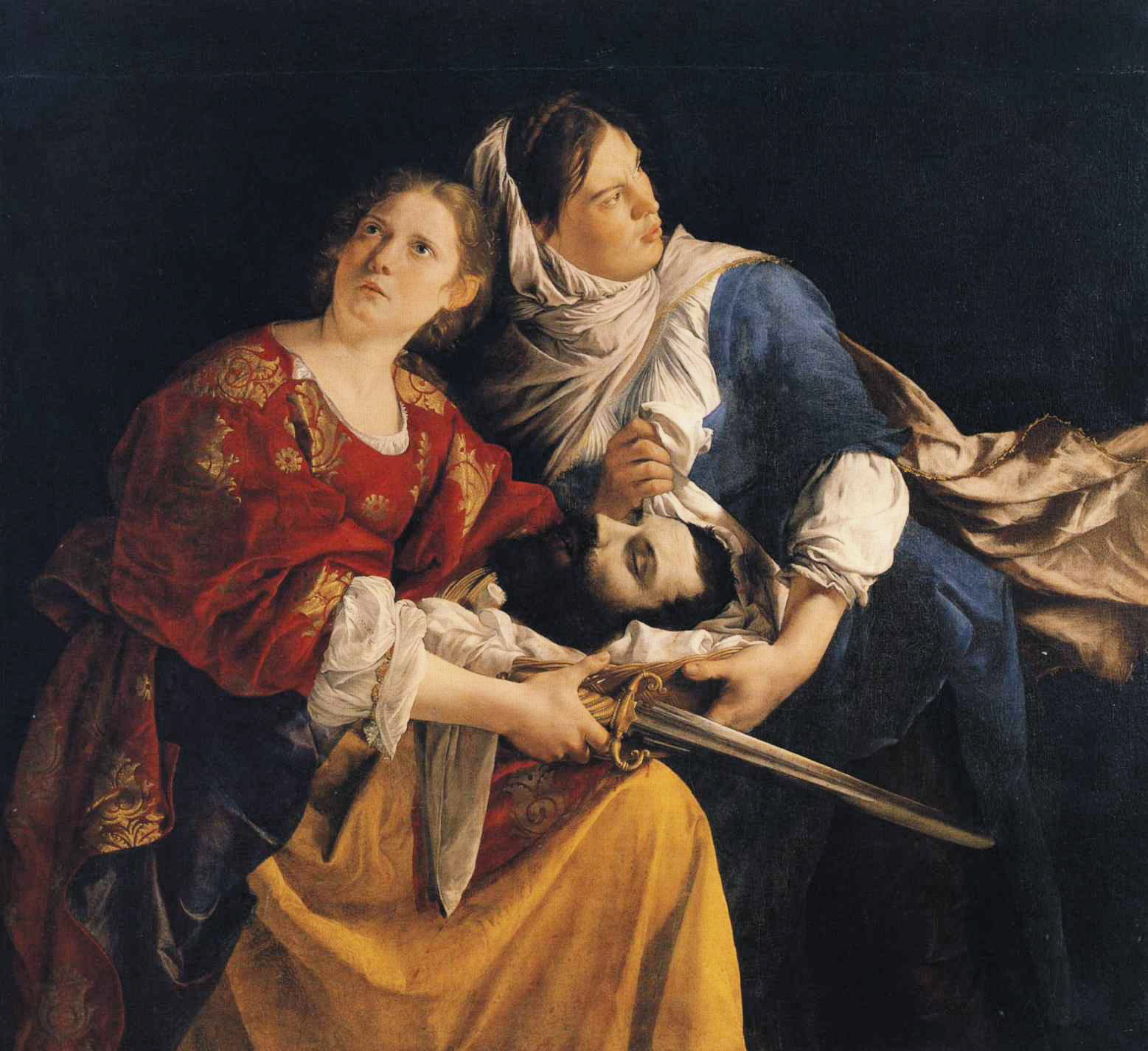
Orazio Gentileschi, Judith and Her Maidservant with the Head of Holofernes, 1621–1624

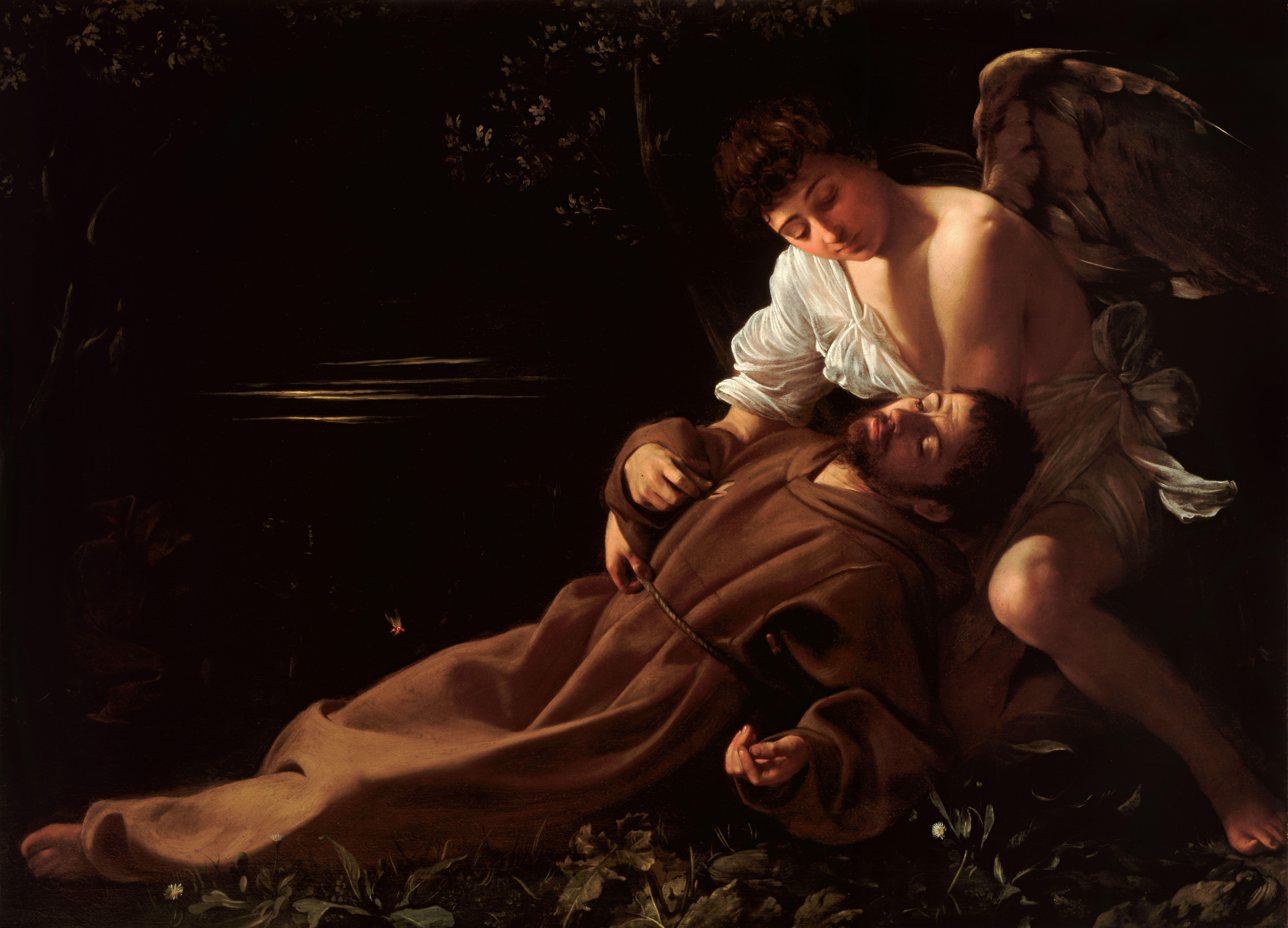
St. Francis in Ecstasy by Caravaggio, c. 1595, oil on canvas, 92,5 x 128,4 cm, Wadsworth Atheneum, Hartford, Connecticut

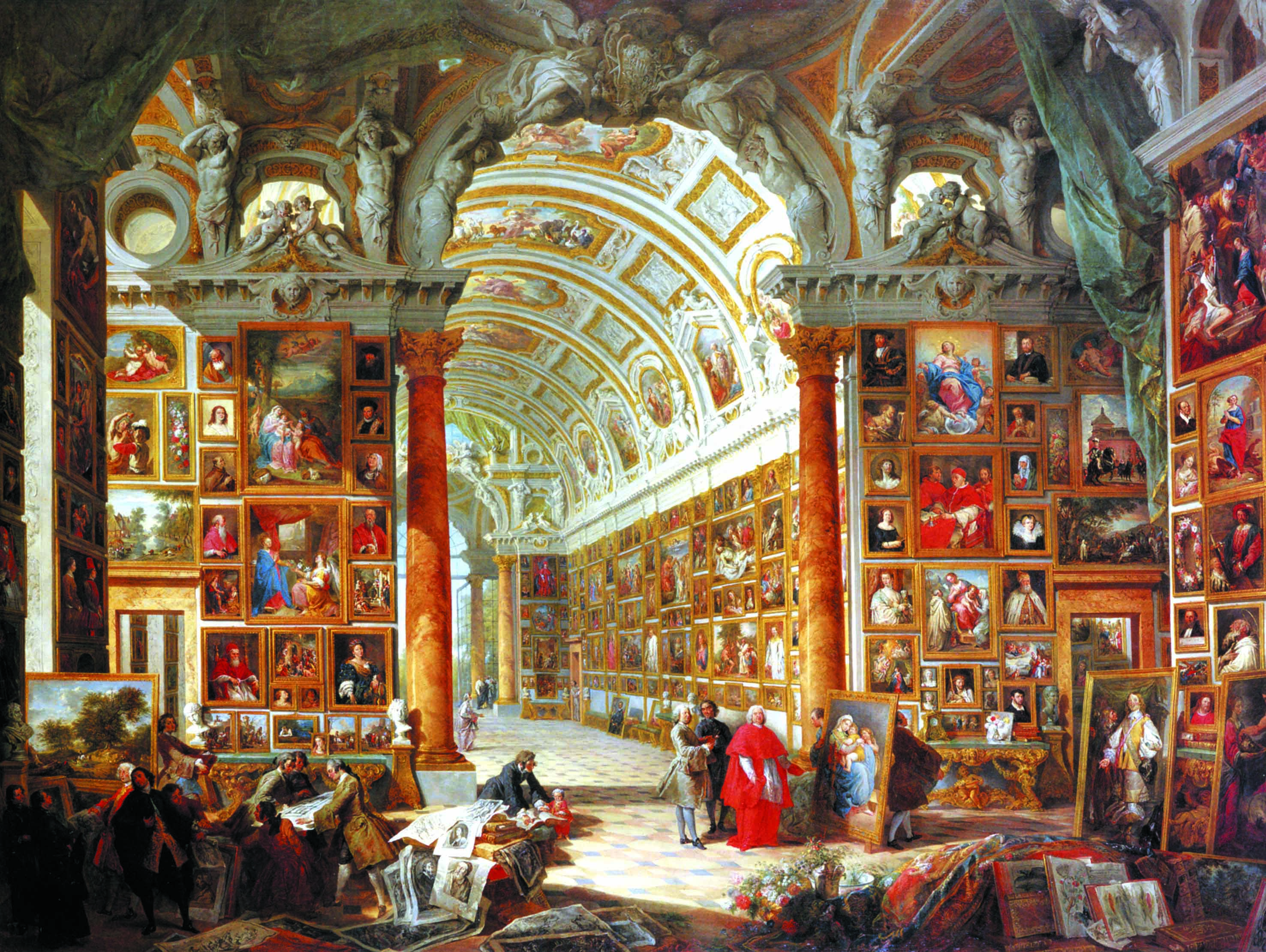
Giovanni Paolo Pannini, Interior of a Picture Gallery with the Collection of Cardinal Silvio Valenti Gonzaga, 1740

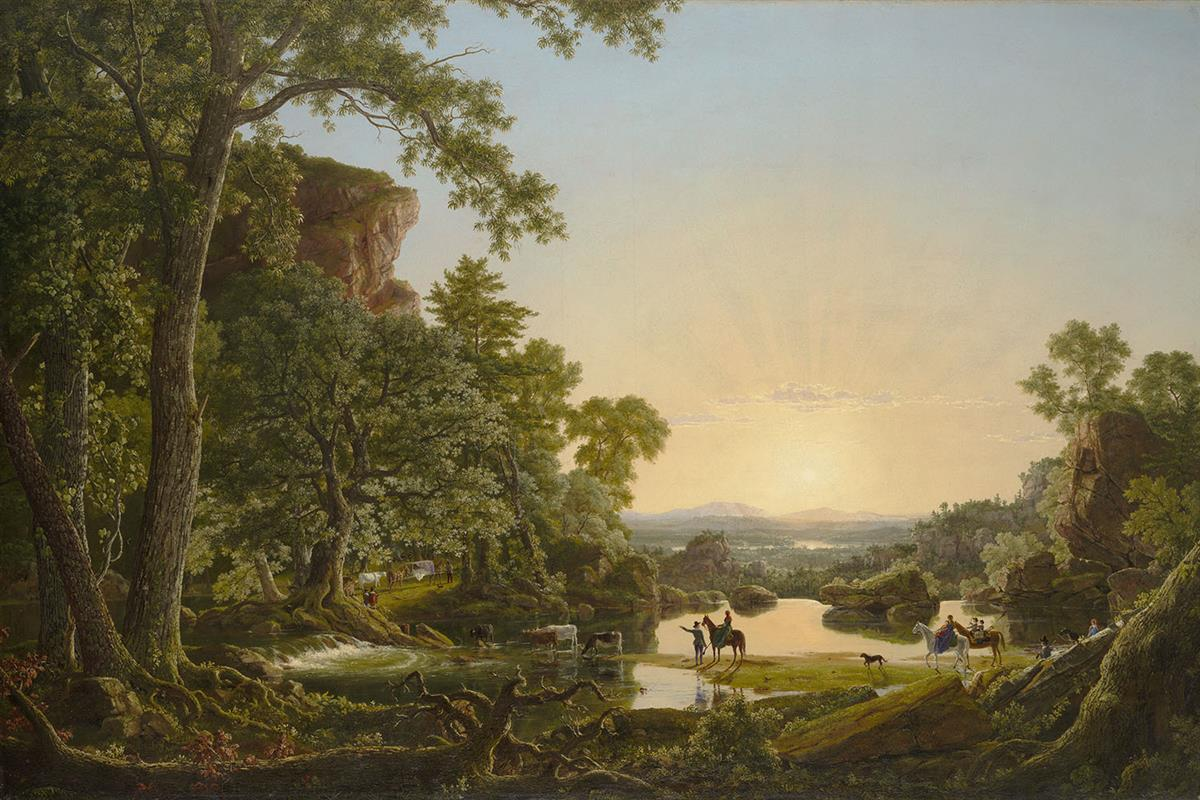
Hooker and Company Journeying through the Wilderness from Plymouth to Hartford, in 1636, Frederic Edwin Church, 1846

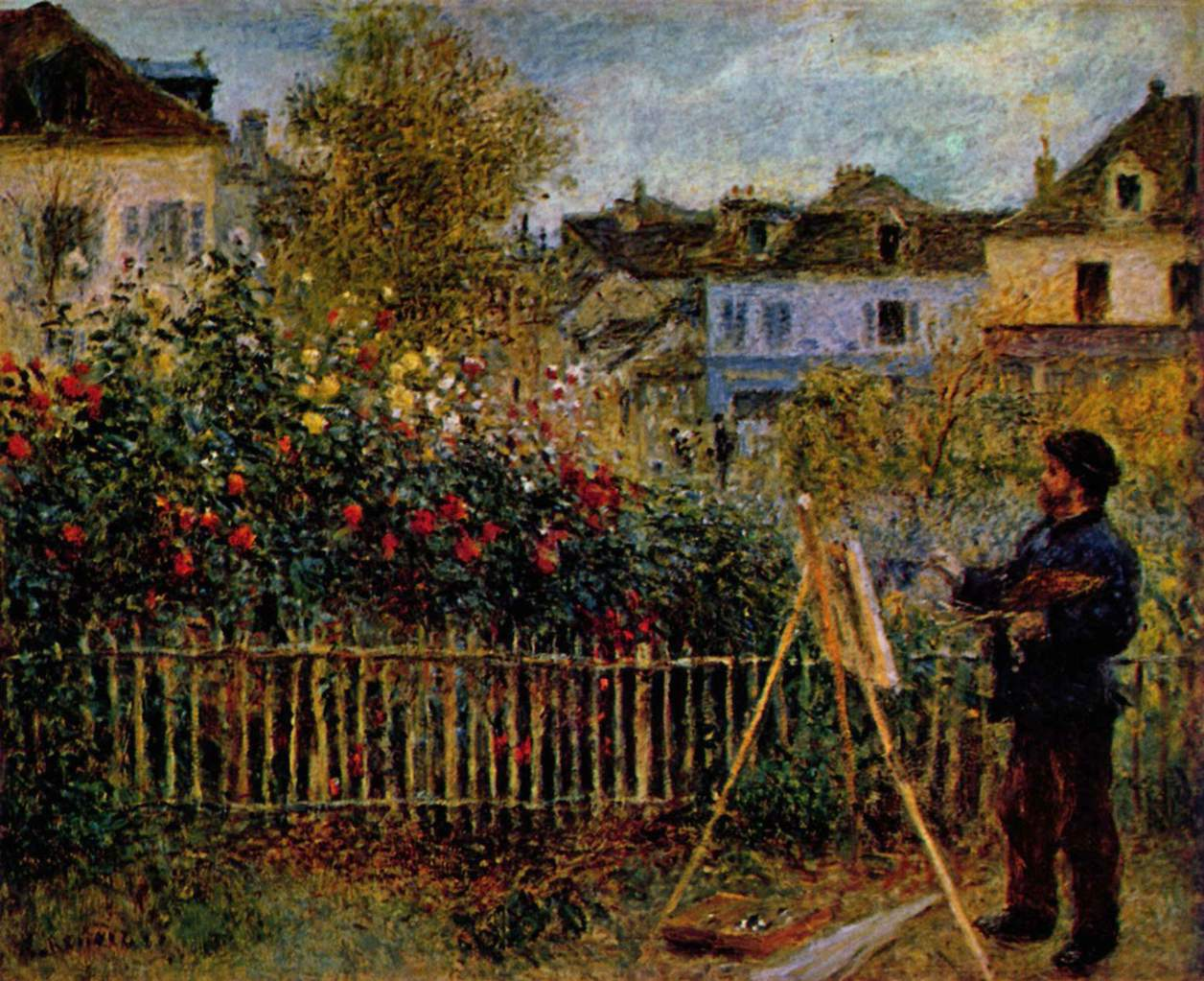
Pierre-Auguste Renoir, Claude Monet Painting in His Garden at Argenteuil, 1873

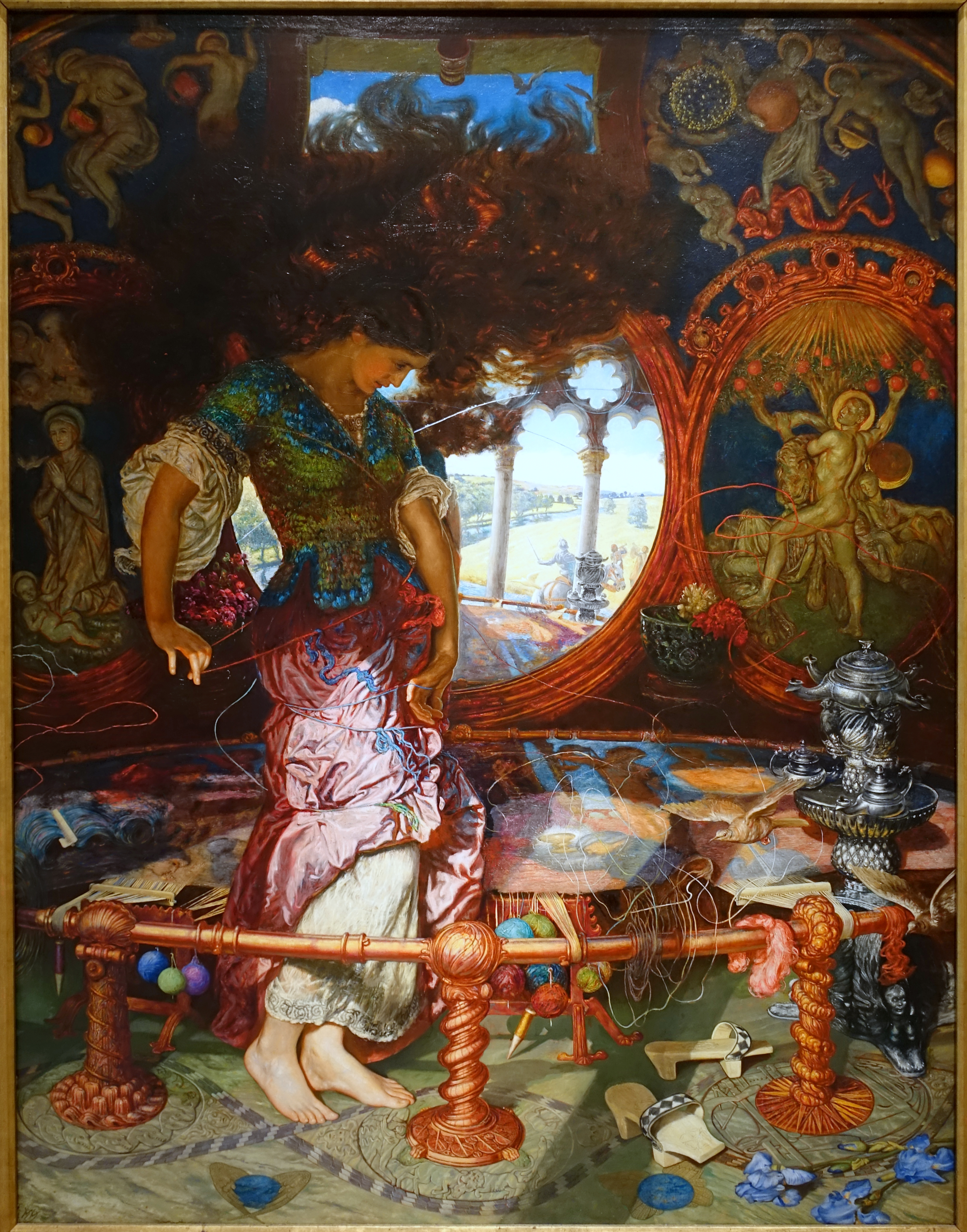
The Lady of Shalott, William Holman Hunt, c. 1888–1905

== See also ==
- National Register of Historic Places listings in Hartford, Connecticut
