= Regine Schumann =

German artist

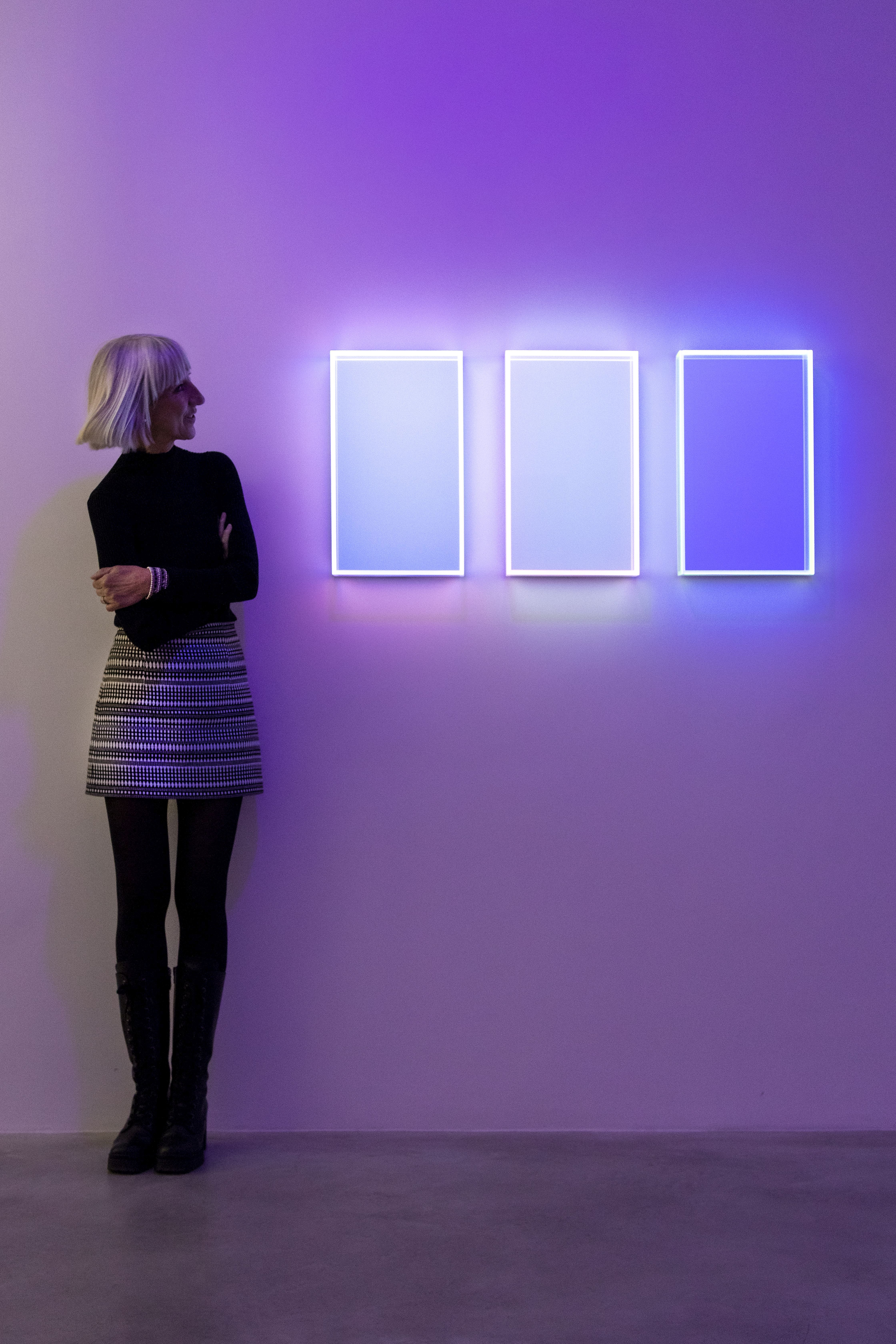
- Regine Schumann in 2021
- Born: February 23, 1961 (age 65); Goslar, Lower-Saxony, West Germany
- Known for: Installation light art
- Movement: Minimalism
- Awards: Leo-Breuer-Prize, 2006
- Website: regineschumann.de

Regine Schumann (born February 23, 1961) is a German artist who is classified as a light artist, contemporary art painter and installation artist. Schumann lives and works in Cologne.

== Life and work ==
Regine Schumann studied from 1982 to 1989 at the Hochschule für Bildene Künste Braunschweig art. In 1989 she was acknowledged as a master student of Roland Dörfler. From 1986 to 1994 she was a member of the artist group Freiraum, consisting of Frank Fuhrmann, Dieter Hinz and Schumann. In addition to scholarships including a DAAD-scholarship for Italy in 1990, a grant from the state of North Rhine-Westphalia for Japan in 2000 and contracts for public art, she received the Leo Breuer Prize in 2006.

In her work Regine Schumann focuses on light effects caused by fluorescent materials. Some of the materials she uses are colored polylight-cords and different colored acrylic panels, which she composes into complex colour spaces in accordance to Goethe's theory of colours. The artist also uses blacklight to complement the other colours.

The emphasis of her room-specific installations is the extension of the existing architecture to a dimension of vibration and - as she calls it - the configuration of a room temperature: "Der Einbezug bildhauerischer Prinzipien wie Hängen, Legen, Arrangieren, Verspannen, Umhüllen ist charakteristisch für die Arbeit Regine Schumanns und führt das Denken in Farben und Farbräumen in eine räumlich erfahrbare Plastizität über." ("The inclusion of sculptural principles as hanging, laying, arranging, conjointing, jacketing is characteristic of the work of Regine Schumann and leads towards a thinking in colors and color spaces in a spatially experiential plasticity.")

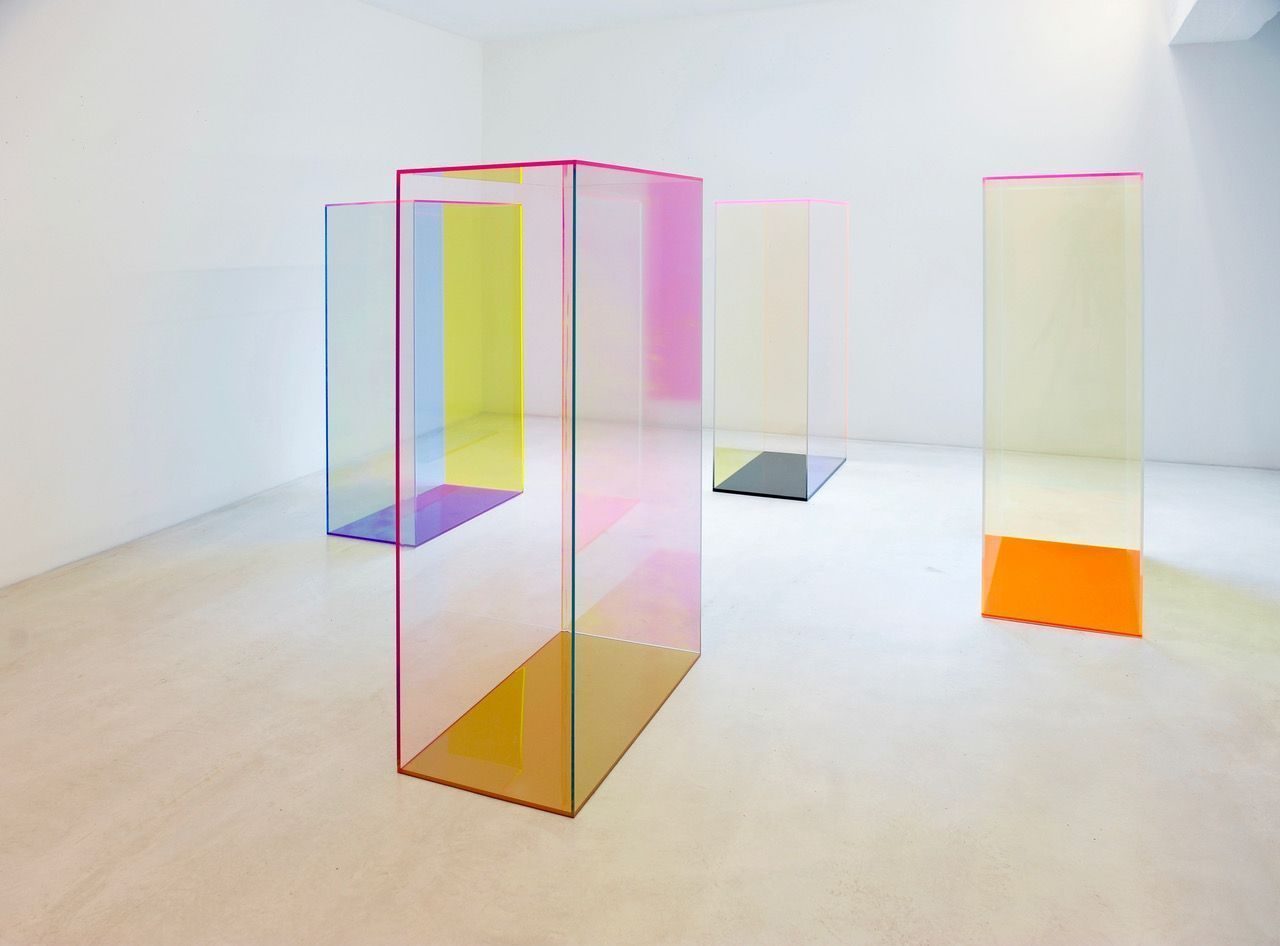
"Lightcatcher" (2017), fluorescent acrylic glass, 4-part installation,
each 160 x 90 x 50 cm

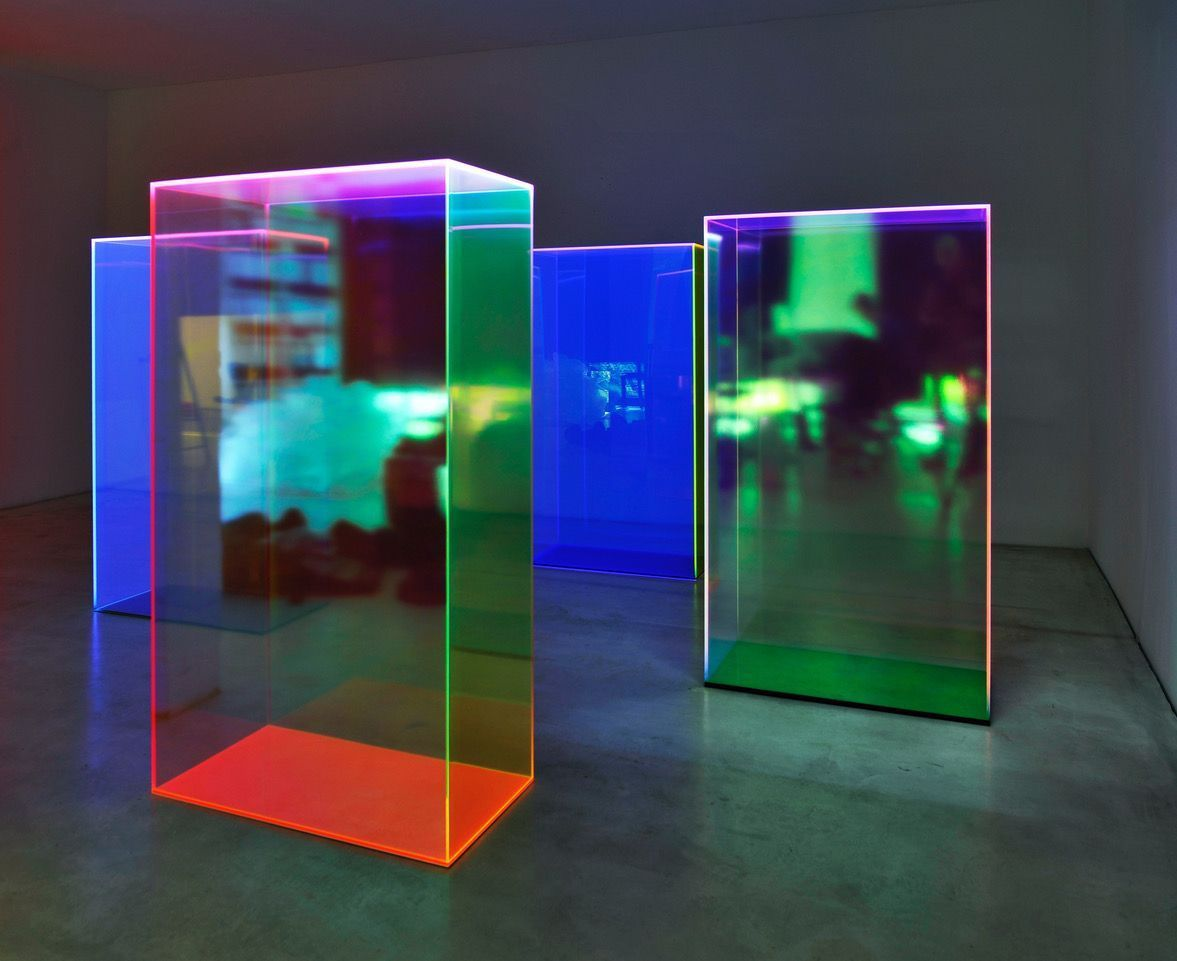
"Lightcatcher" (2017),
Installation view 1

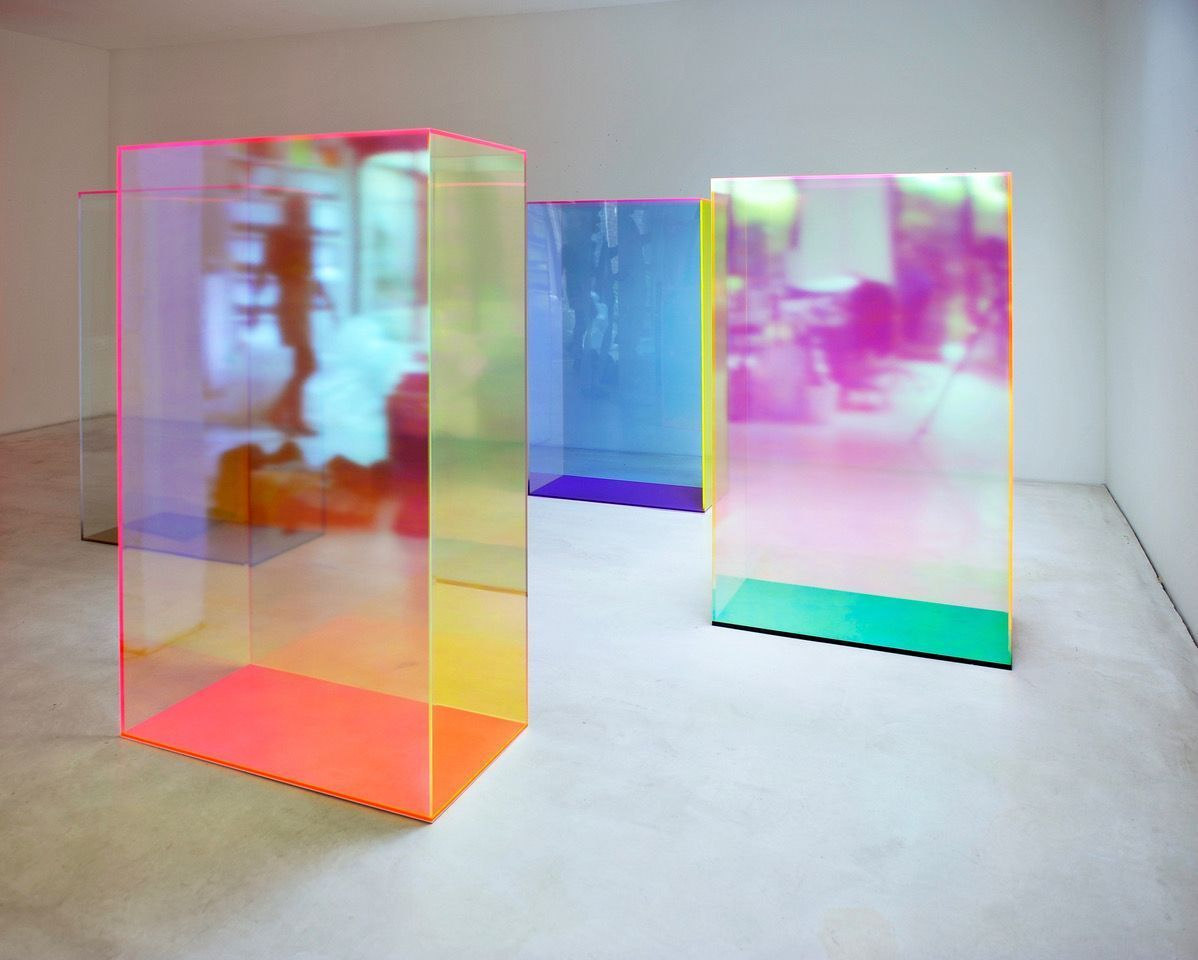
"Lightcatcher" (2017),
Installation view 2

Regine Schumann describes her method of operation in this way: "Das Material des farbigen und fluoreszierenden Acrylglases spielt hierbei eine wichtige Rolle. Der von mir verwendete Werkstoff leuchtet, sobald ihm Lichtenergie zugeführt wird, sei es in Form von natürlichem Tageslicht oder von Kunstlicht. Durch die unterschiedlich farbigen Platten ergibt sich je nach Standort ein Durchleuchten, Schichten, Mischen und Selektieren." ("The material of the colored and fluorescent acrylic glass plays an important role here. The material I use glows as soon as it receives light energy, be it in the form of natural daylight or artificial light. Depending on the location, the different colored panels result in a transmission, merging, mixing and selection.")

The constant changes and effects of light is what fascinates the artist and what she focuses her room-specific installations and works on.

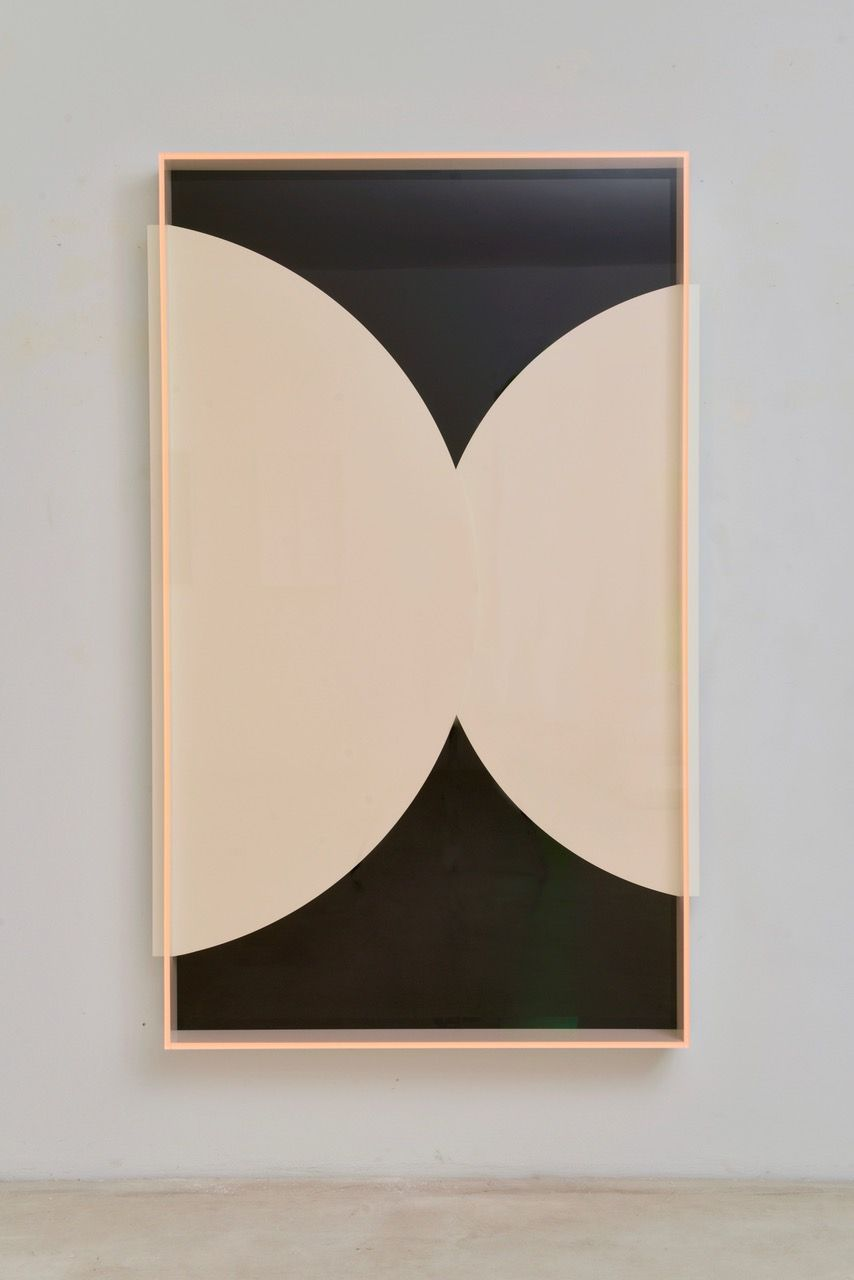
"Colormirror moons Nr 2" (2020),
fluorescent acrylic glass, at daylight, 170 x 100 x 11 cm

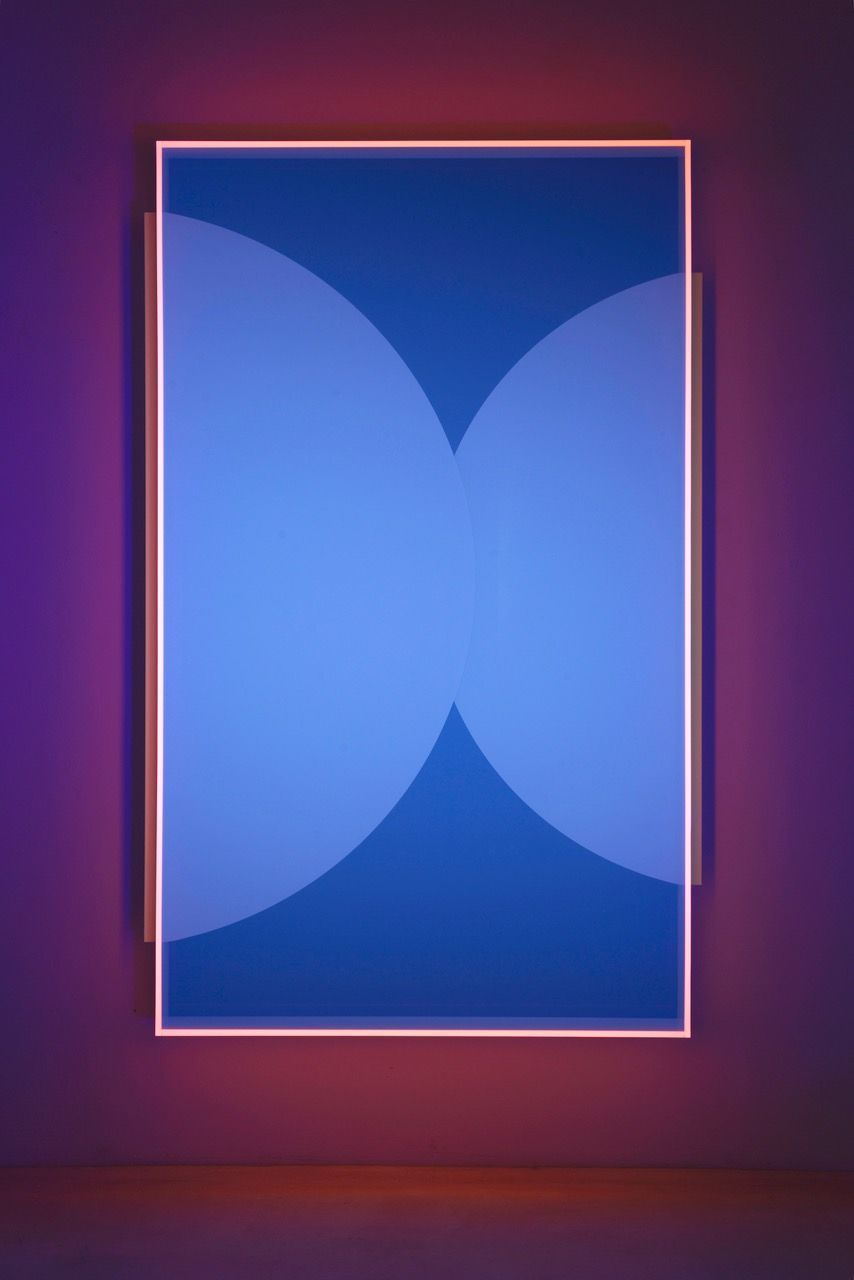
"Colormirror moons Nr 2" (2020), under black light

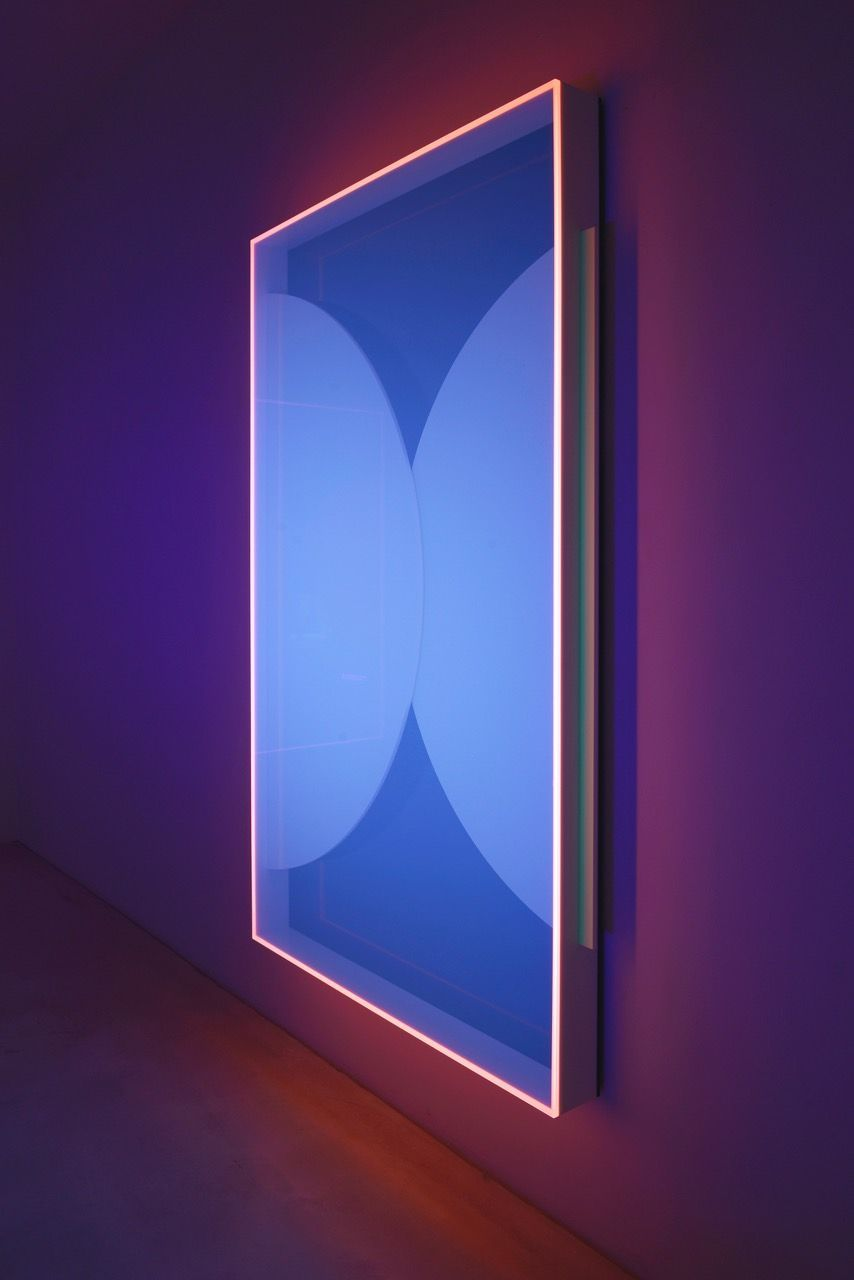
"Colormirror moons Nr 2"(2020),
side view

== Collections ==
- Kunstmuseum Celle, Germany
- Rheinisches Landesmuseum Bonn, Germany
- Centrum Kunstlicht in de Kunst, Eindhoven, The Netherlands
- Stadtmuseum Oldenburg, Germany
- Stroom Foundation, The Hague, The Netherlands
- Städtisches Museum Engen, Engen, Germany
- Kulturstiftung Annelies und Gerhard Derriks, Fürstenfeldbruck, Germany
- Staatliches Museum Schwerin, Germany
- Museum Ritter, Waldenbruch, Germany
- Das kleine Museum of Weißenstadt, Germany
- Museum für Angewandte Kunst Köln
- Kunstmuseum Ahlen

== Art installations outside museums ==
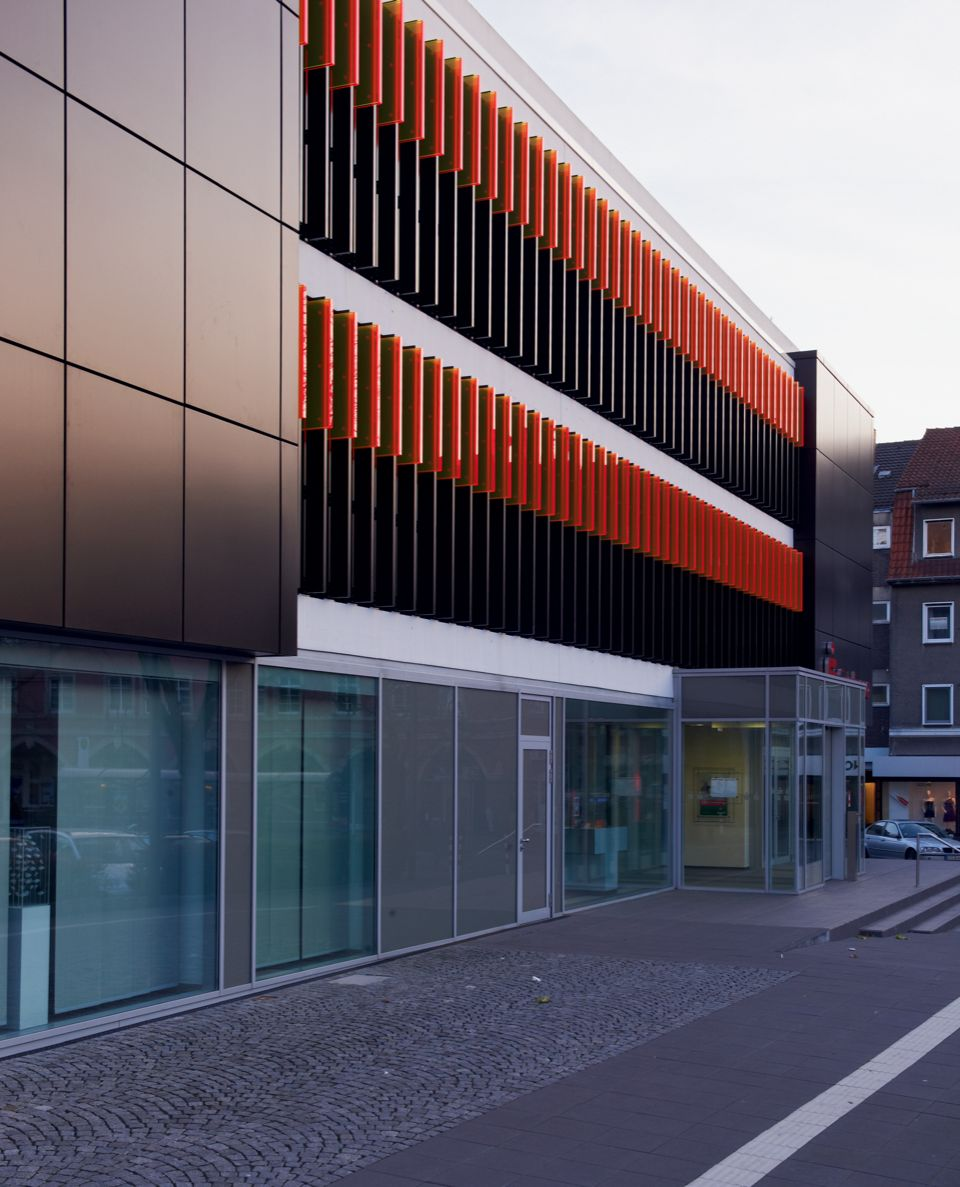
Artinstallation at the outside facade of the headquarter of the Sparkasse Gütersloh–Rietberg, Gütersloh, Fluorescent acrylic glass, 2010,
86 Elements each 120 × 5 × 50 cm, side view

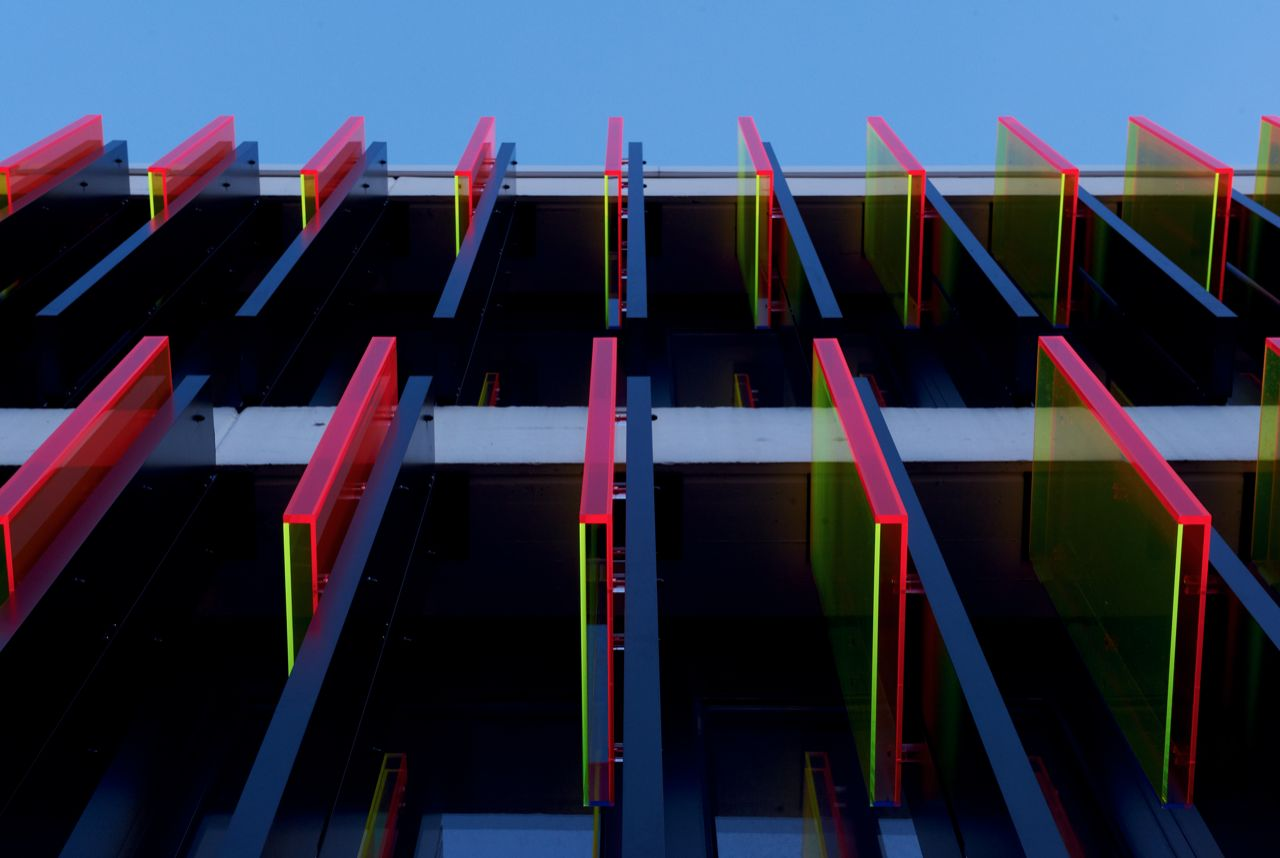
Artinstallation at the outside facade, Fluorescent acrylic glass, by daylight

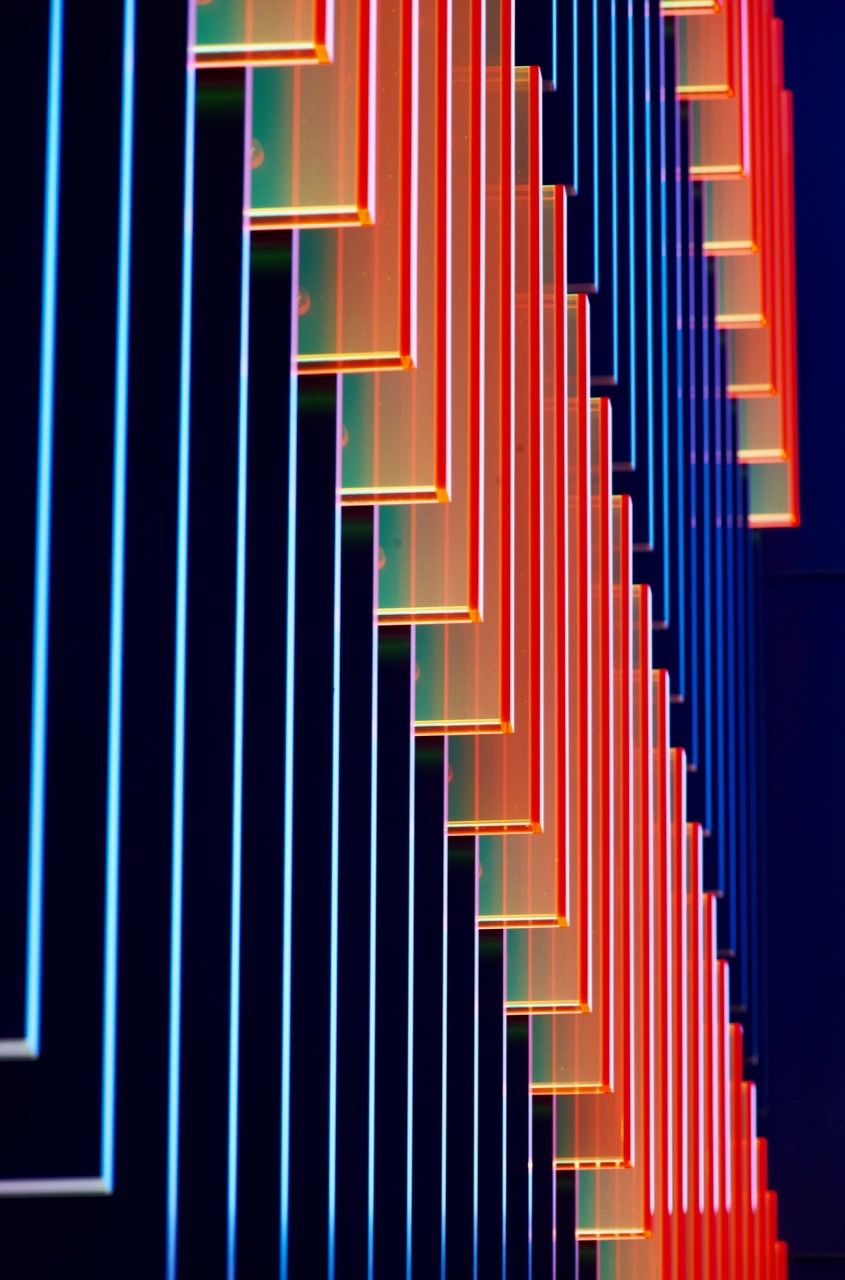
Artinstallation at the outside facade, Fluorescent acrylic glass, by night with blacklight
- 2001: Transparent und Spiegelung, InnSide Hotel, Düsseldorf, Germany
- 2006: Lightline and Flying Circles, Wateringse Veld College, Kommission Stroom, The Hague, The Netherlands
- 2007: Soft Colourmirrors, Herzzentrum der Universitätsklinik Köln (Heart Unit of the University Clinic, Cologne), Germany
- 2009: Thoughts, Multinational Law Firm Freshfields Bruckhaus Deringer, Hamburg, Germany
- 2010: Die Fuge, Artinstallation at the outside facade of the Headquarter of the Sparkasse Gütersloh–Rietberg, Gütersloh Gütersloh, Germany
- 2012: Leuchtwerke (Luminous Works), Hotel Barceló, Hamburg, Germany
- 2020: Design of the interior of the Erlöserkirche, Bad Godesberg, Germany
- 2023: Innerlight, Light installation in the compressor room of the adit Santa Bárbara, Turón, Mieres, Spain
- 2023:Light installation in the redesigned building of the AEW Capital Management company, Boston, United States

== Solo exhibitions ==
- 2000: Regine Schumann: Spring: Roominstallation, Artothek Cologne, Germany
- 2001: Nachtschwärmer (Night revellers), Stadtmuseum Oldenburg, Germany
- 2003: Leopold-Hoesch-Museum, Düren, Germany
- 2003: Reiseluft, Kunstverein Gelsenkirchen, Gelsenkirchen, Germany
- 2006: Candela, Kunstmuseum Villa Zanders, Bergisch Gladbach, Germany
- 2010: Black Box, Museum Ritter, Waldenbuch, Germany
- 2012: Jump, Kunstverein Heidenheim, Germany
- 2014: Moving picture, Museum gegenstandsfreier Kunst, Otterndorf, Germany

== Group exhibitions ==
- 2006: Lichtkunst, Kunstmuseum Celle, Germany
- 2007: Licht, Glas, Transparenz, Kunsthalle Osnabrück, Germany
- 2010: Gruppenausstellung Gabriele-Münter-Preis, Martin-Gropius-Bau, Berlin; Frauenmuseum Bonn, Bonn, Germany
- 2011: Streng geometrisch, Museum Moderner Kunst Kärnten, Klagenfurt, Austria
- 2013: Scheinwerfer – European Light Art , Kunstmuseum Celle, Germany
- 2013: Licht. Kunst. Kinetik, Museum Ritter, Waldenbuch, Germany
- 2015: Enlight my Space, Kunsthalle Bremen, Germany
- 2015: ¡dark!, Unna, Centre for International Light Art, Germany
- 2015: Lichtungen. Internationales Lichtkunstfestival (Lightings. International Light art Festival), Roemer- und Pelizaeus-Museum Hildesheim, Hildesheim, Germany
- 2015: Wege zum Licht (Paths to the Light), Goethe-Museum, Düsseldorf, Germany
- 2017: Signal. Lichtkunst aus der Sammlung Robert Simon, Kunstmuseum Celle, Germany
- 2017: Rot kommt vor Rot, Collection presentation Museum Ritter Waldenbuch, Germany
- 2018: Labyrinth konkret ... mit Nebenwegen (Labyrinth concrete ... with side paths), Museum im Kulturspeicher, Würzburg, Germany
- 2019: Premio Lissone, Museo d'Arte Contemporanea, Lissone, Italy
- 2019: Goethe. Verwandlung der Welt, Bundeskunsthalle, Bonn, Germany
- 2025: Konkrete Frauen. Neue Räume, (The exhibition is part of the III Hellweg Konkret exhibition project), Kunstmuseum Ahlen, Germany

== Videography (selection) ==
- 2021: Regine Schumann: Chromasophia, 03′ 19″
- 2024: Regine Schumann: Iris, 01′ 13″
