= A. Everett Austin House =

Historic house in Connecticut, USA

- U.S. National Register of Historic Places
- U.S. National Historic Landmark
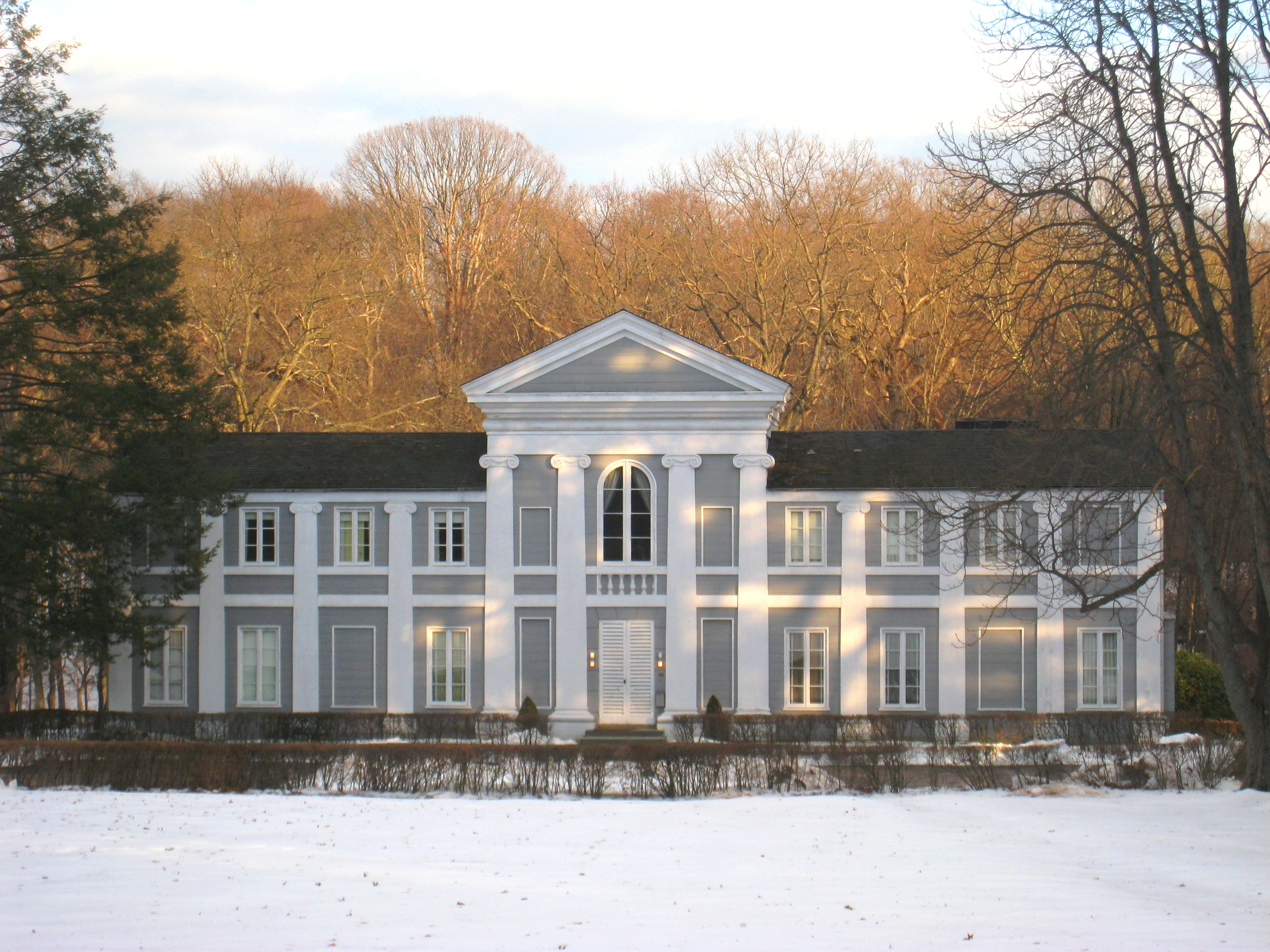

- Location within Connecticut Location within the United States
- Location: 130 Scarborough Street, Hartford, Connecticut
- Coordinates: 41°46′51.36″N 72°42′33.07″W
- Built: 1930
- Architect: French, Leigh H.; Goodwin, H. Sage
- Architectural style: Classical Revival
- NRHP reference No.: 94001189

Significant dates
- Added to NRHP: April 19, 1994
- Designated NHL: April 19, 1994

The A. Everett Austin House is a historic house museum and National Historic Landmark at 130 Scarborough Street in Hartford, Connecticut. It was the home of Wadsworth Atheneum director Arthur Everett "Chick" Austin Jr. Chick Austin built the house in 1930 after seeing the Palladian Villas of the Veneto on his honeymoon. It was declared a National Historic Landmark in 1994, for its distinctive architectural style and for its association with Austin, the Atheneum's director 1927–1944.

The house is a neo-Palladian homage to Vincenzo Scamozzi's Villa Ferreti, built in 1596 in Dolo, Republic of Venice.

The house, only one room deep, is long and narrow, 86 feet in length by 18 feet in depth. In the front elevation, the central three-bay pedimented pavilion is flanked by four-bay wings. The bays are defined by shallow, two-story Ionic pilasters. The walls of the pavilion and wings are in the same plane, since the pavilion does not project. The planar effect is emphasized by the wall sheathing, which is flush boarding, tongue-in-groove. The twelve flat pilasters rise with entasis from bases of double torus moldings to stylized Ionic capitals. Two string courses, one at first-floor ceiling height, the other below second-floor window sills, establish a horizontal orientation to balance the strong upward thrust of the pilasters.

Four stone steps lead up to the double front door in the central bay of the pavilion. Above the door, a balustrade is suggested by half-round, vase-shaped balusters applied to the spandrel under the tall, double round-arched window. First- and second-floor windows in the flanking bays of the pavilion are blind. Windows in the wings are double casements, four panes high at the first floor, three at the second; two are blind at each floor. The pavilion pilasters support a plain architrave and pulvinated frieze. The pediment above is without embellishment in its tympanum, and is wider than the cross gable behind it. The entablature continues under the eaves of the cross-gable roof.

After Austin's departure from Hartford in 1946, Helen Goodwin Austin remained in residence. In 1985, she and her two children, David and Sarah Austin, donated the house to the Wadsworth Atheneum, which provides guided visits of the property.

It is among the homes featured in Bob Vila's Guide to Historic Homes: In Search of Palladio, a six-hour A&E Network study of the work and influence of the Renaissance architect Andrea Palladio. The house was restored in 2000.

== See also ==
- List of National Historic Landmarks in Connecticut
- National Register of Historic Places listings in Hartford, Connecticut
