= Arthur Everett Austin Jr. =

American museum director (1900–1957)

- Born: December 18, 1900; Brookline, Massachusetts, U.S.
- Died: March 29, 1957 (aged 56); Hartford, Connecticut, U.S.
- Resting place: Cemetery on the Hill, Windham, New Hampshire, U.S.
- Education: Harvard College, Phillips Academy, Andover

Arthur Everett "Chick" Austin Jr. (December 18, 1900 – March 29, 1957) was the director of the Wadsworth Atheneum from 1927 through 1944. Austin persisted in the introduction of then-modern theater and modern design and especially contemporaneous art. Salvador Dalí, Alexander Calder, and Gertrude Stein benefited from his advocacy.

Chick Austin helped alter the way Americans looked at and thought about modern art. For starters, he organized the first Picasso retrospective in the United States, put on the first show of Surrealist art and, with Kirstein, helped engineer the immigration of choreographer George Balanchine and sow the seeds for Balanchine's School of American Ballet.

— Michael Z. Wise, "The Man Who Pushed Picasso"

== Early life ==
Austin was born in Brookline, Massachusetts, attended Noble and Greenough School near Boston and Phillips Academy, Andover, before entering Harvard College in the Class of 1922. He interrupted his undergraduate career to work in Egypt and the Sudan (1922-1923) with the Harvard University/Boston Museum of Fine Arts archaeological expedition under George A. Reisner, then the leading American Egyptologist. After taking his degree in 1924, he became a graduate student in Harvard's fine arts department, where he served for three years as chief graduate assistant to Edward W. Forbes, Director of the Fogg Art Museum. He was a first-cousin of the American artist Stephen Etnier.

== Hartford ==
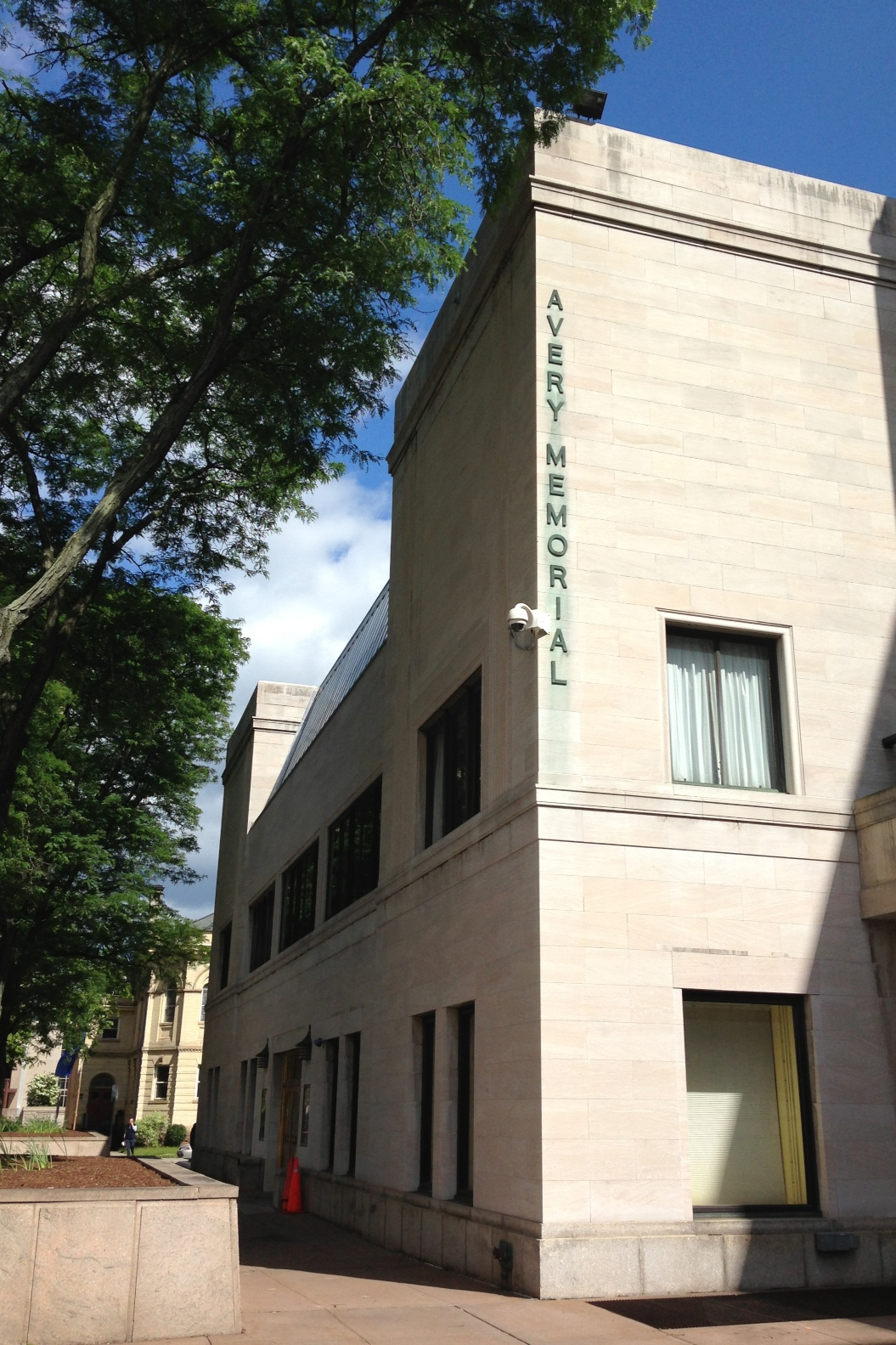
Avery Memorial

Austin was appointed director of the Wadsworth Atheneum at the age of 26, and simultaneously joined the staff of Trinity College, Hartford, where he founded the fine arts department and taught throughout his tenure while director of the Wadsworth. In 1929, Austin married Helen Goodwin in Paris. The Goodwins were among the founders of Hartford, and related to and closely allied with the family of Hartford-born J. Pierpont Morgan, one of the Wadsworth Atheneum's great benefactors.

Austin produced America's first comprehensive exhibitions of Italian Baroque painting (1930), surrealism (1931), and Pablo Picasso's works (1934). The Picasso show formed part of the opening of a new wing, the Avery Memorial, largely designed by Austin himself (with Morris & O'Connor of New York City) and which boasted the first International style museum interior in the United States. At that time, Austin also inaugurated the Avery Theater (now Aetna Theater), one of the first theaters in an American art museum, with the premiere of the opera Four Saints in Three Acts by Gertrude Stein and Virgil Thomson.

In 1928 Austin founded The Friends and Enemies of Modern Music, a society that sponsored premieres or early performances of works by composers such as Igor Stravinsky, Charles Ives, Erik Satie, and Virgil Thomson, as well as Vivaldi, Scarlatti, and Couperin (played on period instruments). The 1936 American premiere of Satie's symphonic drama Socrate, for example, featured one of Alexander Calder's early mobiles. An innovation begun in 1929 was the showing of motion pictures (foreign, experimental, and Hollywood) seven years before films were shown at the Museum of Modern Art. The most far-reaching of Austin's theatrical ventures was the Wadsworth Atheneum's sponsorship, at Lincoln Kirstein's request, of choreographer George Balanchine's immigration to the United States in 1933, originally to found the School of American Ballet in Hartford.

== Ringling Museum ==
Austin was also a member of the International Brotherhood of Magicians. Later in life, he was the first director of the John and Mable Ringling Museum of Art. He was instrumental in bringing the Asolo Theater, first constructed in 1798 in Asolo, Italy by Antonio Locatelli, to the museum.

Austin became obsessed by sleight of hand and magic, and having billed himself as "Professor Marvel" as a boy, he returned as "The Great Osram — Masked Master of Multiple Mysteries" in mature life, giving regular entertainments in public and even taking his act on road shows. This desire to amaze, time after time, also characterized the Masked Master in his parallel role as museum director.

— Michael Peppiatt, "Professor Marvel at the Atheneum."

== Later years ==
Austin died of lung cancer in Hartford, Connecticut on March 29, 1957, at the age of 56.

== Austin House ==
A. Everett Austin House, the West End home Chick Austin built in 1930 after seeing the Palladian Villas of the Veneto on his honeymoon, is a National Historic Landmark. It is among the homes featured in Bob Vila's Guide to Historic Homes: In Search of Palladio, a six-hour A&E Network study of the work and influence of the Renaissance architect Andrea Palladio.

== Bibliography ==
- 1958: (published posthumously) A. Everett Austin Jr.: a Director's Taste and Achievement. Hartford: Wadsworth Atheneum, 1958.
- Eugene R. Gaddis (2000). Magician of the Modern: Chick Austin and the Transformation of the Arts in America. New York: Alfred A. Knopf. ISBN 978-0-394-58777-6. OCLC 1036699300 – via the Internet Archive.
