= Brigitte Kowanz =

Austrian artist (1957–2022)

Brigitte Kowanz (13 April 1957 – 28 January 2022) was an Austrian artist. Kowanz studied from 1975 to 1980 at the University of Applied Arts Vienna. She was Professor of Transmedial Art there from 1997.

== Works ==
Since the 1980s, Brigitte Kowanz's work focused on the investigation of space and light. At the beginning of this period, between 1979 and 1984, she produced paper and screen images with phosphorescent and fluorescent pigments in collaboration with Franz Graf. From 1984, Kowanz developed her first light objects from bottles, fluorescent lamps and fluorescent paint. Complex spatial images and light-shadow-projections were created using the simplest of means.

However, light is not only a material, but also often a topic of Kowanz's works. For example, she was engaged with the speed of light in a personal complex of works since 1989. A very small decimal number in neon figures indicates the time that the light needs to cover the length of this sequence of numbers.

One complex issue that Kowanz was engaged in since the 1980s is that of language and writing and its translation into codes. Light was investigated as a space-forming medium as well as an information carrier and medium of knowledge and visibility.

From 1995, Kowanz also regularly used the morse alphabet – based on simple dash-dot combinations – for coding purposes. As a binary code, it represents the origin of the transfer of information using light. Kowanz used (semi-)transparent glasses and mirrors, especially in her later works. This led to a diverse overlaying of the virtual and the real in her three-dimensional objects. The mutual reflection of light, language and mirror (Rainer Fuchs) produces hybrid spaces whose boundaries seem to be clearly defined at one moment, but gone again the next. Real space and virtual reflection penetrate each other, the boundaries between artwork and observer became fluid.

The occupation with the intangible physics of light, which – although a guarantee of visibility – is itself slightly overlooked, persists in the works of Brigitte Kowanz.

== Personal life ==
Kowanz lived and worked in Vienna. She died on 28 January 2022, at the age of 64.

Brigitte Kowanz was the daughter of the well-known footballer Karl Kowanz (1926-1998), her mother Edith worked as a clerk, her older brother Karl (* 1951) became a graphic artist. Brigitte Kowanz graduated from the Kunstgymnasium Wien in 1975, then studied - like her brother before her - at the Hochschule für angewandte Kunst, graduating in 1980 with a Magister Artium.

Brigitte Kowanz's son, Adrian Kowanz (*1995), a trained art historian and close collaborator for many years, has been managing her estate ever since.

== Awards ==
- 1989 Otto Mauer Prize
- 1991 Prize of the City of Vienna for Visual Arts
- 1996 Austrian Art Prize for Visual Arts
- 2009 Grand Austrian State Prize for Visual Arts
- 2018 German Light Art Award
- 2019 Cairo Biennale Prize

== Exhibitions (selection) ==
- 2020 Brigitte Kowanz - Lost under the Surface, Museum Haus Konstruktiv, Zurich
- 2019 Cairo Biennale, Cairo
- 2017 La Biennale di Venezia, Austrian Pavillon, Venice
- 2013 Bryce Wolkowitz Gallery, New York
- 2013 Lightshow, Hayward Gallery, Southbank Centre, London
- 2012 Borusan | Contemporary, Istanbul (solo exhibition)
- 2012 MACRO, Museo d'Arte Contemporanea, Rome
- 2011 Galerie im Taxispalais, Innsbruck (solo exhibition)
- 2010 MUMOK, Museum Moderner Kunst, Vienna (solo exhibition)
- 2007 Kunsthalle Krems (solo exhibition)
- 2006 Lichtkunst aus Kunstlicht, ZKM, Karlsruhe
- 2004 Stadtlicht – Lichtkunst, Lehmbruck-Museum, Duisburg
- 2001 Austrian Contemporary Art Exhibition, Shanghai Art Museum
- 2000 Farbe zu Licht, Fondation Beyeler, Basel
- 1995 Neuer Berliner Kunstverein (NBK), Berlin
- 1993 Wiener Secession (solo exhibition)
- 1990 Biennale of Sydney
- 1989 Prospect, Frankfurter Kunstverein
- 1987 São Paulo Art Biennial
- 1984 Aperto, Venice Biennale

== Art in public space (selection) ==
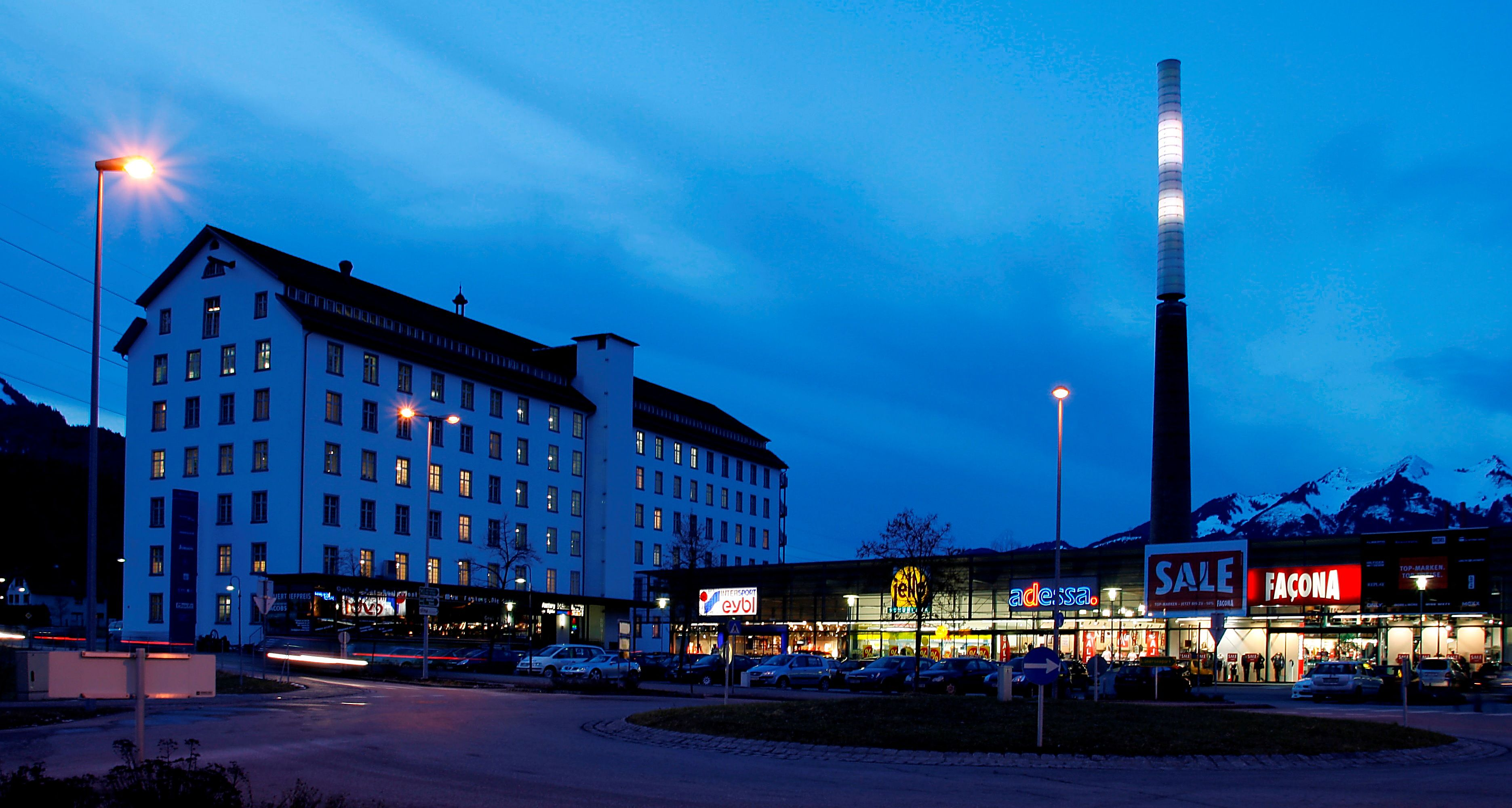
Lünerseepark Bürs

- 2020 Light Circles, MQ-Libelle in Vienna's Museumsquartier
- 2010/2012 Max Planck Institute for Chemistry, Mainz
- 2010/2011 Staatsbrücke bridge, Salzburg
- 2009/2010 Volksbank AG, Vienna
- 2007–2008 Museum Liaunig, Neuhaus
- 2006–2007 Max Planck Institute for Molecular Biomedicine, Münster
- 2003/2005 DKV, Cologne
- 2003/2004 Regional Music School, Windischgarsten
- 2001/2004 Jacob Burckhardt House, Basel
- 2002/2004 LGT Liechtenstein, Vaduz
- 2001 BUWOG, Vienna
- 1999/2000 ARD Capital Studio, Berlin
- 1999 Lünerseepark, Bürs
- 1995/99 Peter Merian House, Bahnhof Ost railway station, Basel

== Works in museums and public collections (selection) ==
=== Austria ===
- Albertina, Vienna
- Lentos Art Museum, Linz
- mumok – museum of modern art ludwig foundation vienna
- State Museum of Lower Austria, St. Pölten
- Essl Collection, Klosterneuburg
- Museum of Applied Arts, Vienna
- Österreichische Galerie Belvedere, Vienna
- Tyrolean State Museum, Innsbruck

=== International ===
- Centre for International Light Art (Unna)
- Museion (Bolzano)
- Museum Ritter (Waldenbuch)
- Museo de Bellas Artes (Caracas)
- Kunstmuseum Celle
- Fundación ARCO (Madrid)
- Borusan Art Collection (Istanbul)
- Kunsthalle Weishaupt (Ulm)
- Schauwerk Sindelfingen

== Bibliography (selected) ==
- Beate Ermacora; Gregor Jansen: Brigitte Kowanz – in light of light. Nuremberg: Verlag für moderne Kunst 2012. ISBN 978-3-86984-283-7
- Museum Ritter, Waldenbuch (publ.): Brigitte Kowanz: Think outside the box. Heidelberg: Verlag Das Wunderhorn 2011. ISBN 978-3-88423-388-7
- Museum Moderner Kunst Stiftung Ludwig Wien (publ.): Brigitte Kowanz. Now I See. Nuremberg: Verlag für moderne Kunst 2010. ISBN 978-3-86984-141-0
- Agnes Husslein-Arco, Gerald Bast (publ.): Brigitte Kowanz: ad infinitum. Vienna: Belvedere 2008. ISBN 978-3-901508-42-4
- Galleria Contemporaneo, Mestre (publ.): Brigitte Kowanz. Dario De Bastiani Editore 2007. ISBN 978-88-8466-105-0
- University of Applied Arts, Vienna (publ.): more L978T. Vienna 2006. ISBN 3-85211-131-5
- Wolfgang Häusler (publ.): Another time another place, Brigitte Kowanz. Munich 2002. ISBN 3980849406
- Wolfgang Häusler (publ.): Zeitlicht-Lichtraum, Brigitte Kowanz. Ostfildern-Ruit: Hatje-Cantz 2001. ISBN 978-3-7757-9108-3
- University of Applied Arts, Vienna (publ.): Brigitte Kowanz. Die Zwischenzeit vom Schattensprung belichten, Vienna 1998. ISBN 978-3852110646
- Licht ist was man sieht. Brigitte Kowanz. Vienna: Triton Verlag 1997. ISBN 3-901310-77-0
- Wiener Secession (publ.), Brigitte Kowanz. Vienna 1993. ISBN 3-900803-63-3
