= Lucinda Devlin =

American photographer (born 1947)

- Born: 1947 (age 78–79)
- Occupation: Photographer

Lucinda Devlin (born 1947) is an American photographer. Devlin lives and works in Greensboro, North Carolina.

Her mid-2000s project Field Culture documented American crop farming. In her series The Omega Suites, she documented execution chambers across the United States.

Her work is included in the collection of the Museum of Fine Arts Houston, the Whitney Museum of American Art, and the San Francisco Museum of Modern Art.
