= Molitor & Kuzmin =

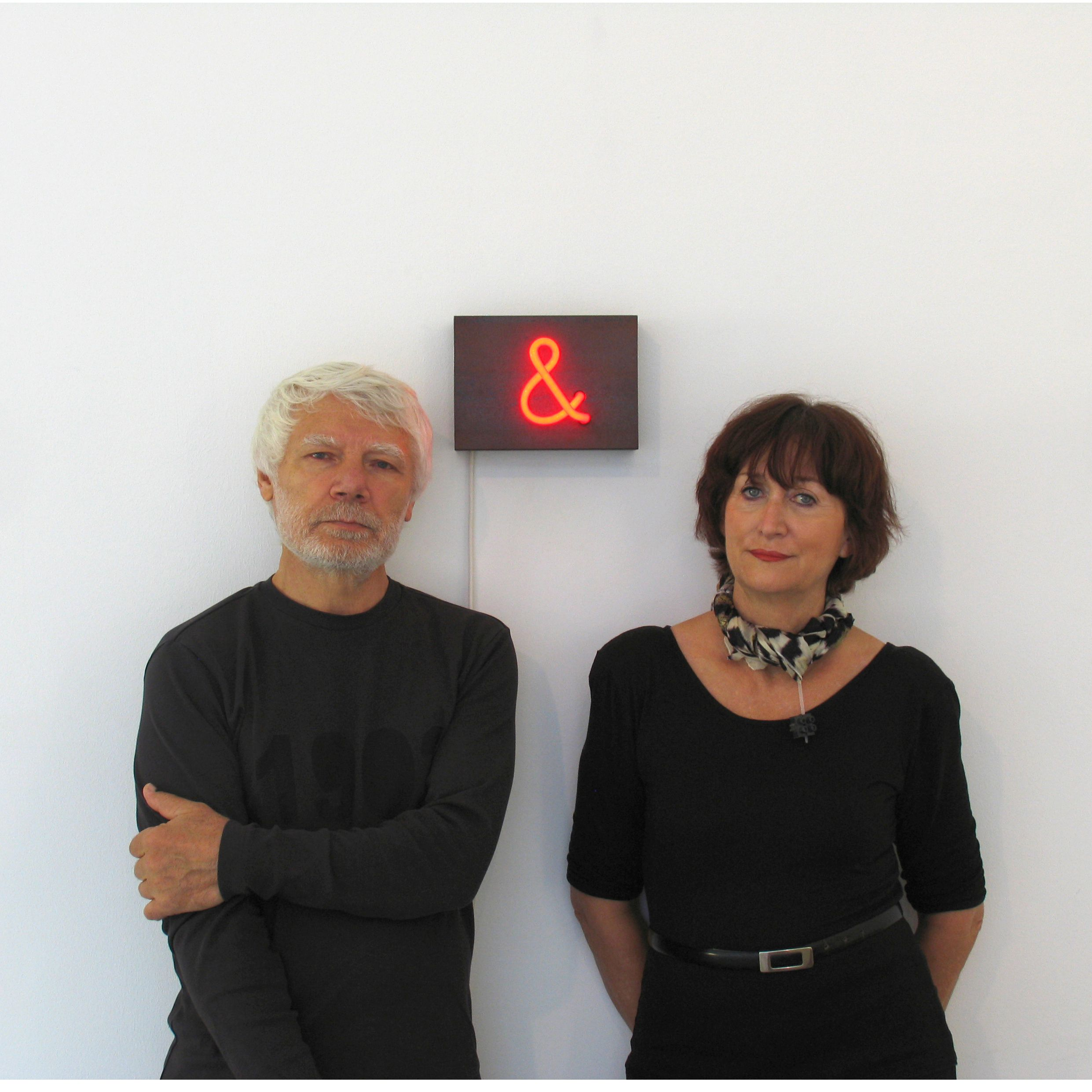
- Photo of the Light artists Ursula Molitor & Vladimir Kuzmin
- Born: Ursula Molitor and Vladimir Kuzmin; June 6, 1947 (age 78) Ursula Molitor Hermannsburg, Lower-Saxony, and October 16, 1943 (age 82) Zaporizhchja Soviet Union (Vladimir Kuzmin)
- Known for: Installation, Light art
- Movement: Concrete art
- Website: molitor-kuzmin-art.de

Molitor & Kuzmin are a collaborative duo of visual artists, who are classified as light art and installation artists.

== Life and work ==
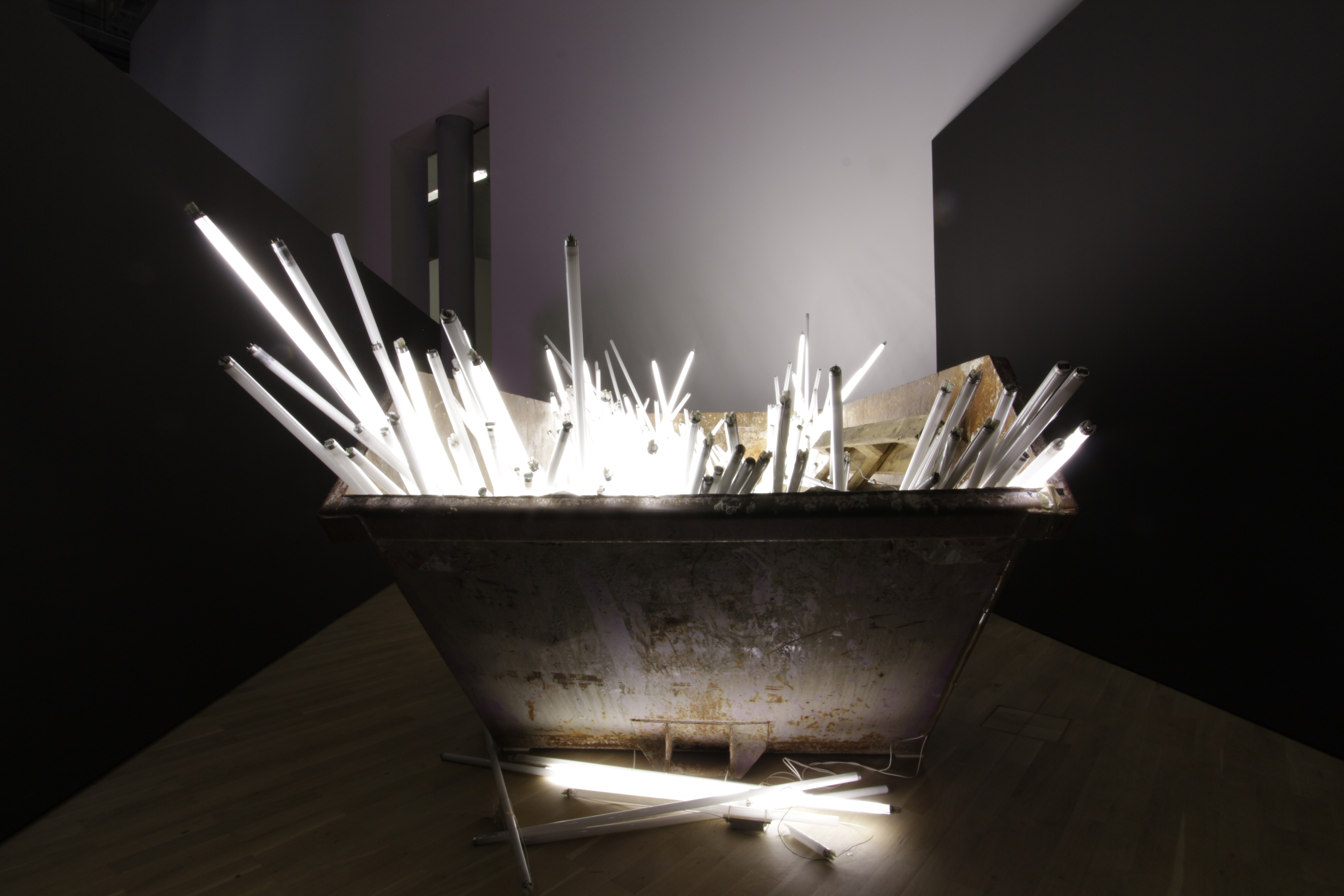
Lightinstallation "Do we need Light?" photographed on the occasion of the exhibition at the Kunstmuseum Wolfsburg 2022

Ursula Molitor (born June 6, 1947, in Hermannsburg, Lower-Saxony) is a German artist, graphic designer and light artist. She studied graphic design in Hamburg and later worked as a graphic artist and illustrator. Since 1983 she has been working as a freelance artist in Cologne, Germany.

Vladimir Kuzmin (born October 16, 1943, in Zaporizhchja, Soviet Union, today Ukraine) is a Russian artist. He studied architecture in Moscow and worked as a freelance artist in the field of painting and graphic design in Moscow. Since 1992 he has been living and working in Cologne.

Since 1996, together they have formed the artist duo Molitor & Kuzmin. In their installations and Light art objects they work with the play of light and shadow, with contrasts and paradoxes. Preferred materials include fluorescent lamps that they deploy like modules, as design elements of their artworks. At a remove from their original meaning, these modules are combined into artefacts, whose technical character and materiality appear to dissolve in radiant brightness, resulting in a work which presents light: Die Leuchtstoffröhre ist Form und Farbe zugleich. (in English: The fluorescent tube is form and colour as well.)

== Collections ==
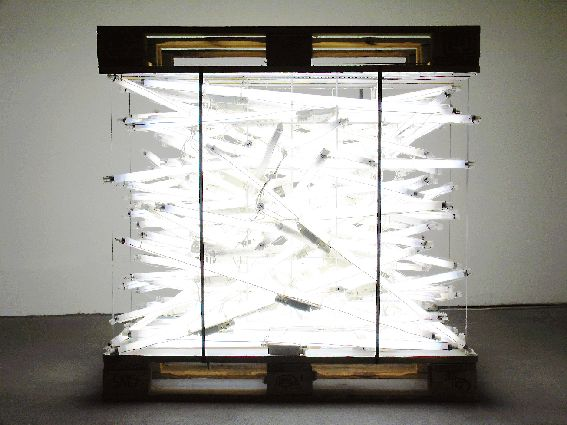
Molitor & Kuzmin Installation Frachtgut, 1998

- Kunstmuseum Celle, Celle, Germany
- Artothek Kunstmuseum Villa Zanders, Bergisch Gladbach, Germany
- Collection Kunstmuseum Villa Zanders, Bergisch-Gladbach, Germany
- Sparkasse KölnBonn, Cologne, Germany
- IKK Bundesverband, Bergisch Gladbach, Germany
- Sammlung Schroth, Soest, Deutschland
- L'Association Mouvement Art Contemporain (AMAC), Chamalières, France
- ART4.RU Contemporary Art Museum, Moscow, Russia
- Moscow Museum of Modern Art (MMOMA), Moscow, Russia
- National Centre for Contemporary Arts, Moscow, Russia

== Nominations ==
- 2004: Light Art Prize LUX US, City Museum of Lüdenscheid, Germany
- 2010: International André-Evard Art Award, Kunsthalle Messmer, Riegel, Germany
- 2015: International Lucas-Cranach-Prize, Kronach, Germany
- 2016: International André-Evard Art Award, Kunsthalle Messmer, Riegel, Germany

== Art in public places ==
- 2009: Ohne Titel, Light art Installation im Dachgiebel, Kunstmuseum Celle, Celle, Germany
- 2016: Ein Pilgerstab für Soest, Light art Installation, Soest, Germany

== Solo exhibitions (selection) ==
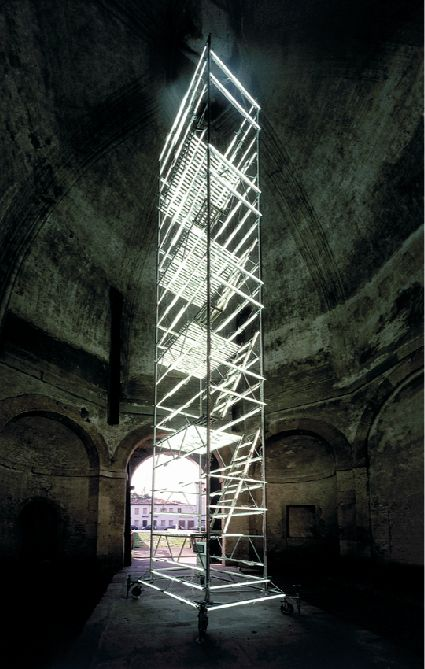
Molitor & Kuzmin Lichtinstallation Porta Savonarola, Padua, Italien, 2001

- 1999: Galleria Fioretto Arte Contemporanea, Padua, Italy
- 2000: Video- und Light art Installation, St. Gereon's Basilica, Cologne, Germany
- 2000: Millennium, St.Petri Kirche Lübeck, Lübeck, Germany
- 2000: ZeitRäume, Kunstmuseum Villa Zanders, Bergisch Gladbach, Germany
- 2001: Light, Galleria Fioretto Arte Contemporanea, Padua, Italy
- 2001: Light art Installation in Porta Savonarola, Padua, Italy
- 2003: Fiat Lux, Galerie Schröder und Dörr, Bergisch Gladbach, Germany
- 2006: Fiat Lux, Krokin Gallery, Moscow, Russia
- 2007: Paradisi Gloria - 4 Licht-und Videoinstallationen zu den Konzerten, Münchner Rundfunkorchester, Herz-Jesu-Kirche, Munich, Germany
- 2008: In a different Light, Shchusev Museum of Architecture, Moscow, Russia
- 2010: ÖffentLicht, Kunstmuseum Villa Zanders Bergisch Gladbach, Germany
- 2010: Requiem, Projekt im Tschechow-Theater, Moscow, Russia
- 2010: Et fact est Lux, White Square Gallery, Berlin, Deutschland
- 2016: Take me to the Light, Galerie Floss & Schultz, Cologne, Germany
- 2022: Extended, Museum L (Muze’um L Licht en Landschap), Roeselare, Belgium

== Group exhibitions (selection) ==
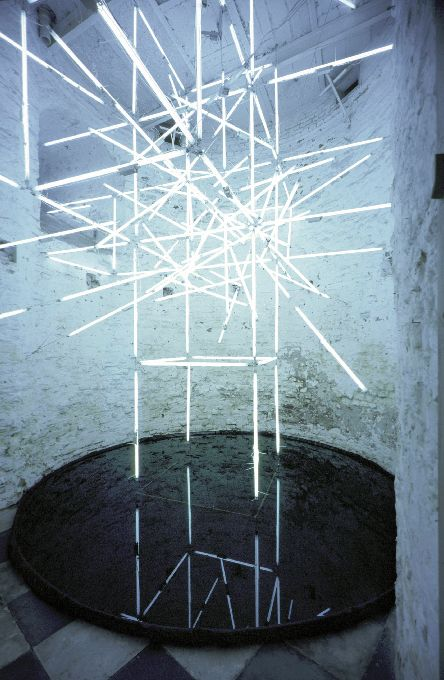
Molitor & Kuzmin Lichtinstallation, Römerturm, Köln, 2000

- 2000: Raumüberschreitungen - Visionen zum Weltall, Galerie Inge Baecker,
- 2000: ZeitRäume, Kunstmuseum Villa Zanders, Bergisch Gladbach, Germany, (a.o. with Hanne Darboven, Douglas Allsop, Madeleine Dietz)
- 2005: De Kunst van TL (Tube Luminescent), Centre for International Light Art, Eindhoven, Netherlands
- 2006: Lichtrouten Luedenscheid, Lüdenscheid, Germany
- 2006: KunstLichtTore Bochum, Kunstmuseum Bochum, Germany
- 2007: Signaal, Centre for International Light Art, Eindhoven, Netherlands
- 2008: Pas de deux - Wie sich die Bilder gleichen. 15 Jahre Artothek, Artothek Kunstmuseum Villa Zanders, Bergisch-Gladbach, Germany
- 2009: Lichtwelten, Weltenlicht, Galerie Inge Baecker, Bad Münstereifel, Germany (with Rosa M. Hessling)
- 2009: Leuchtzeichen, Kunstmuseum Celle, Celle, Germany (with Jan van Munster)
- 2010: Requiem, Chekhov Theatre, Moscow, Russia
- 2013: Firmament, Krokin Gallery, together with the planetarium of the city of Moscow, Russia
- 2013: Ceci n'est pas une Lampe..., Gesellschaft für Kunst und Gestaltung, Bonn, Germany (a.o. with François Morellet, Jan van Munster)
- 2013: Scheinwerfer – European Lightart, Kunstmuseum Celle, Celle, Germany (with Jürgen Albrecht, Tim Berresheim, Urs Breitenstein, Klaus Geldmacher, Andrea Thembie Hannig, Detlef Hartung und Georg Trenz, Daniel Hausig, Margareta Hesse, Christoph Hildebrand, Hans Kotter, Siegfried Kreitner, Mischa Kuball, Vollrad Kutscher, Stefanie Lampert, Heinz Mack, Francesco Mariotti, Jakob Mattner, Chris Nägele, Otto Piene, Stephan Reusse, Susanne Rottenbacher, Max Sudhues, Timm Ulrichs, Nils Völker, Rosmarie Weinlich, Claudia Wissmann, Achim Wollscheid)
- 2013: Vielfalt statt Einfalt. 20 Jahre Artothek Kunstmuseum Villa Zanders, Kunstmuseum Villa Zanders, Bergisch Gladbach, Germany
- 2014: Lucida Space, National Centre for Contemporary Arts (NCCA), Moscow, Russiad (a.o. with Ilya Kabakow, Erik Wladimirowitsch Bulatow, John Cage)
- 2015: Lichtungen, Internationales Lichtkunstfestival, Roemer- und Pelizaeus-Museum Hildesheim, Hildesheim, Germany
- 2017: Signal. Lichtkunst aus der Sammlung Robert Simon, Kunstmuseum Celle, Celle, Germany (with a.o. Klaus Geldmacher, Daniel Hausig, Albert Hien, Christoph Hildebrand, Kazuo Katase, Hans Kotter, Brigitte Kowanz, Siegfried Kreitner, Mischa Kuball, Francesco Mariotti, Otto Piene, Stephan Reusse, Susanne Rottenbacher, Max Sudhues, Timm Ulrichs)
- 2017: On Target, Exhibition in the framework of European Capital of Culture Paphos 2017, Paphos, Cyprus
- 2017: //Responsive: International Light Art Project Halifax, NSCAD University , Halifax, Canada
- 2017/2018: ¡Bright!, Centre for International Light Art, Unna, Germany
- 2018: Collumina I - Internationales Licht Kunst Projekt Köln, Cologne, Germany
- 2022: Macht! Licht!, Kunstmuseum Wolfsburg, Germany
- 2022/2023: Fantasy of Light, Galerie Braunbehrens, Stuttgart, Germany
