= Lichtrouten Luedenscheid =

German Festival

Lichtrouten is a festival with focus on professional light art and lighting design which takes place regularly in Lüdenscheid, Germany.

Since 2002 Bettina Pelz and Tom Groll are the artistic directors.

In 2004 the festival received the "Innovation Award" by "Sauerland Initiativ". In 2007 it received the "Martin-Leicht-Award" by "Westfalen Initiative".

== 2002 ==
"Black Boxes" was the subject of the first edition. Instead of a "white cube" light art works need darkness to be visible. All installations were shown in blackened containers which were spread around the city's center. Participating artists were Tatsuro Bashi, Danica Dakic, Klaus Geldmacher, Daniel Hausig, Georg Hartung, Hermelinde Hergenhahn, Stefan Hofmann, Nan Hoover, Kazuo Katase, Dieter Kiessling, Francesco Mariotti among others.

The LED installation „Memories of Wind“ by Stefan Hofmann became a permanent one after the exhibition.

== 2003 ==
"Blind Spots" was the subject of the second edition. Urban spaces which were ignored by city development or disappeared from the public consciousness hosted installations, interventions and performances by Barbara Buchholz and Olga Koumeguer, Yvonne Goulbier, Sabine Kacunko, Mischa Kuball, André-Philip Lemke, Aurelia Mihai, Thomas Roppelt, Helmut Schweizer and Michel Verjux.

The installation „Souvenirs“ by Helga Griffiths received the Lichtrouten Audience Award.

== 2004 ==
The third edition was titled "Biotopes". Locations were urban parks and greens. Participanting artist were Sanja Iveković, Magdalena Jetelová, Gudrun Kemsa, Klaus Obermaier, Roman Signer, Jan van Munster, Katarina Veldhues and Gottfried Schumacher.

== 2005 ==
All works in 2005 were located in car parks around the city's center. The edition was titled "Park Sceneries". Participating artists were Christian Boltanski, Klaus Obermaier, Katarina Veldhues and Gottfried Schumacher.

== 2006 ==
For "Architecture of Remembrance" public spaces like buildings, memorials and cemeteries which link citizens and visitors to the past became the sites of works of Danica Dakić, Jean-François Guiton, Ron Haselden, Thomas Koener, Mischa Kuball, Christina Kubisch, Molitor & Kuzmin, Jakub Nepraš, Jaan Toomik, Mai Yamashita and Naoto Kobayashi.

The lighting design of the cemetery "Mathilde" by Gustavo Avilés received the Lichtrouten Audience Award.

The installation „Firefly Palace" by Francesco Mariotti stayed in place until 2010.

The installation "UVA-UVB" by Stefan Sous became permanent work in the city's center.

== 2010 ==
Sites which are traces of the industrial heritage of the city became "Wunderkammers" with works by Gudrun Barenbrock, Ghíju Diaz de León, Ali Heshmati and Lars Meeß-Olsohn, Olga Kisseleva, Thorbjørn Lausten, Dominik Lejman, Ocubo, Stephan Reusse, Sigrid Sandmann, Gebhard Sengmueller, Ursula Scherrer and Kurt Laurenz Theinert.

The projection „Des Fischers fette Beute“ by Katharina Berndt stayed in place.

== 2013 ==
In 2013 the subject is „The Art of Projection". Participating artists are Juergen Albrecht, Refik Anadol, Atsara, Cuppetelli and Mendoza, Christoph Girardet, Hartung and Trenz, Dieter Kiessling, Vollrad Kutscher, Justin Lui, Jakob Mattner, László Moholy-Nagy, Klaus Obermaier, Otto Piene, Rainer Plum, Davide Quayola, Diana Ramaekers, Nicolas Schöffer, Robert Sochacki, Max Sudhues und Amy Youngs.
