= Miguel López =

Miguel López may refer to:

- Miguel López de la Serna (died 1490), Spanish prelate of the Roman Catholic Church
- Miguel López de Legazpi (1503-1572), Spanish governor of the Philippines
- Miguel López (musician) (1938–2023), Colombian accordionist
- Miguel López (film editor) (born 1945), Argentine film editor
- Miguel López (footballer, born 1949), Cuban footballer
- Miguel Lopez (soccer, born 1953), American soccer defender
- Miguel López Abril (1954–2021), Spanish basketball player
- Miguel López (footballer, born 1988), Argentine football midfielder for Pillar
- Miguel López (athlete) (born 1990), Puerto Rican sprinter
- Miguel López Perito (fl. 2000s), Paraguayan politician
- Miguel López Rivera (fl. 2010s), Puerto Rican politician and mayor of Las Piedras

== See also ==
- Miguel Ángel López (disambiguation)
