= Francesco Mariotti =

Swiss artist and cultural activist (1943–2026)

- Born: 13 April 1943; Bern, Switzerland
- Died: 22 January 2026 (aged 82)
- Education: University of Fine Arts of Hamburg
- Occupation: Media artist
- Years active: 1965–2026
- Website: mariotti.ch

Francesco Mariotti (13 April 1943 – 22 January 2026) was a Swiss artist and cultural activist. He had residences in Zürich, Locarno, and Punta Sal, Peru.

== Early life and first projects ==
Mariotti was born in Bern on 13 April 1943 and moved to Peru in 1952. He then studied at the University of Fine Arts of Hamburg between 1965 and 1968. After graduation, he was chosen by the "Project Geldmacher – Mariotti" to participate in an interactive art installation for Documenta 4 in Kassel. He exhibited "The Circular Movement of Light" for the 1969 X São Paulo Biennial.

== Period in Peru ==
In 1971, Mariotti moved back to Peru. During that period, he was approached by Alfonso Castrillon, who at that time was the Director of the Institute of Contemporary Art (located at the Italian Art Museum), who invited him for a solo show. Mariotti proposed to Castrillon a different idea: to develop and open the game by calling artists and cross-cutting creative agents in a sort of festival, which challenged all categories and hierarchies. Mariotti organised Contacta 71, a total art festival, whose results were so successful that it was organised for a second year with the support of the military junta. Then Mariotti is hired by the Government to work for the National System of Social Mobilization (SINAMOS). Mariotti and María Luy, his partner, were absorbed by the promises of an Andean revolution, and moved in September 1972 to Cusco, where they developed art and communication projects in popular sectors, which included the socialisation of serigraphic techniques among the peasant population. He developed the Hatariy (1972) and Inkarri (1973 and 1974) Festivals in Cuzco. SINAMOS decided to establish Inkarri as a nationwide popular festival and a final competition that took place at the Campo de Marte in Lima.

In 1976, he created a course "Conception and development of projects of art and communication" ("Concepción y desarrollo de proyectos de arte y comunicación") at the National School of Fine Arts in Lima, being the first time such a course was given in the country. The success was limited; only three students were registered, which demonstrated the conservative environment at that time.

In the mid 1970s, after the military junta of Juan Velasco Alvarado was over, he returned to Lima and started Huayco E.P.S. (the acronym for "Aesthetics of Social Projection"), created as a creative cooperative studio.

== Return to Europe ==
The eighties provided a very complex and uncertain panorama in Peru, and Mariotti, along with his family, decided to move back to Switzerland. From 1981 to 1986, he collaborated with Rinaldo Bianda at the Fabiana Gallery and in the VideoArt Festival of Locarno, becoming the General Secretary of the festival (1982–1987). In 1987, he moved to Zurich, where he lived and worked until 2025, undertaking systematic work linked to the creation of lighting and kinetic sculptures, which consisted of metallic structures (usually of industrial materials) to which were added circuits, sensors and computers, creating hybrid sculptures that create the perception of being alive (some recite poetry, others speak, etc.). He was one of the first artists to work intensively with LED before it became mainstream. He relocated to Locarno.

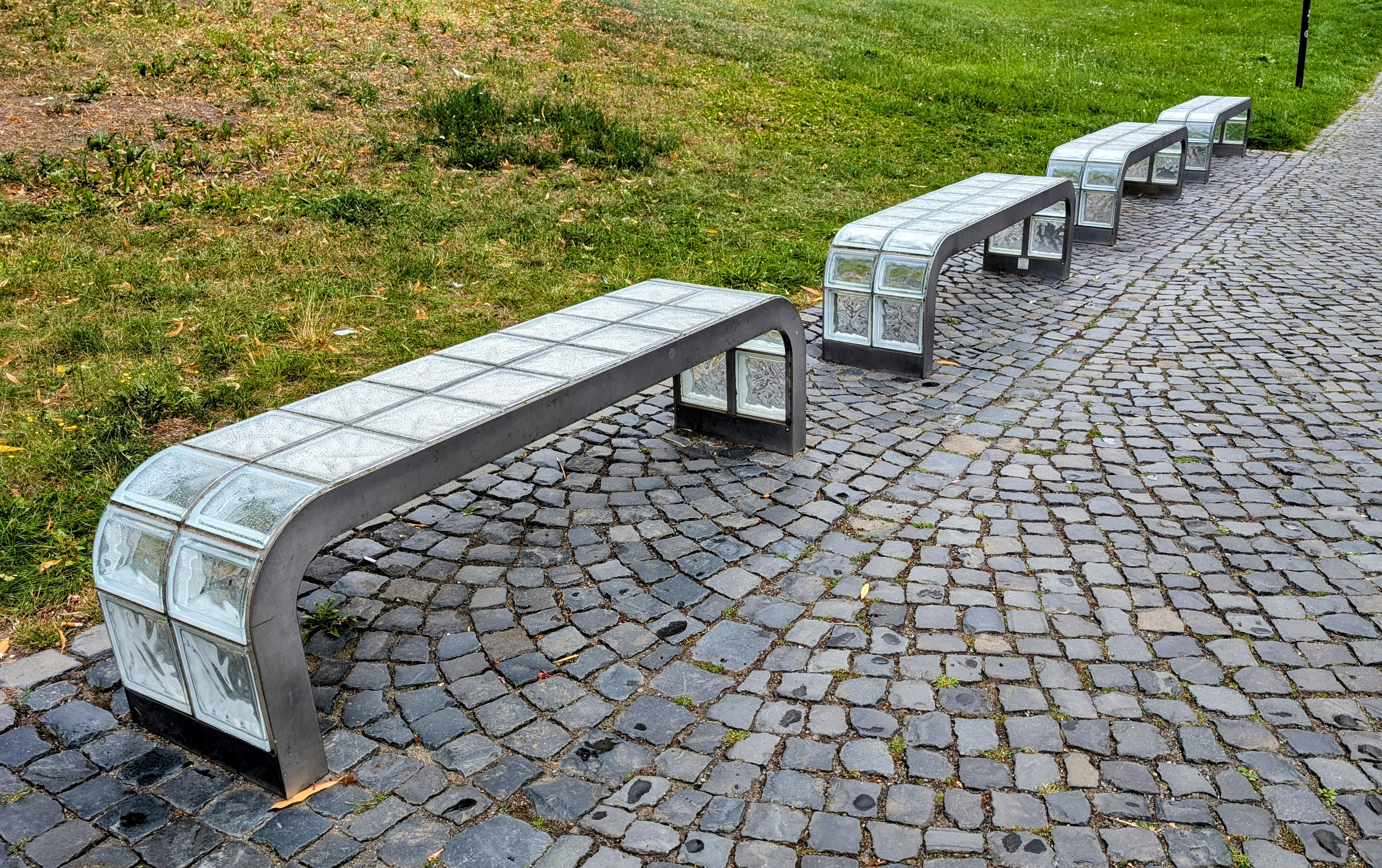
Lichtbänke (Francesco Mariotti), Hildesheim, Germany

His work was part of an exploration to analyse nature through oral traditions and Andean and Amazonian myths, to confront, in the late 90s, natural and ecological contexts, producing its first hybrid gardens and quantum gardens and developing renaturalization projects in collaboration with scientists and activists.

His works are in collections of major museums and private collections, such as the ZKM Museum for Art and Media, Karlsruhe, Germany; Kunstmuseum Celle mit Sammlung Robert Simon, Germany; MALI Lima, Perú; Museo de Bellas Artes, Caracas, Venezuela; Kunsthaus Zürich; Video Library Sammlung Julius Bär, Switzerland; Museum of Latin American Art (MOLAA), Long Beach; UBS, Locarno, Switzerland. The MAC LIMA presented a retrospective exhibit of his work from November 29, 2025 to April 26, 2026 in Lima, Peru.

In 2018 as a part of series of events organized worldwide to celebrate the 50 years of the Leonardo journal, a local tribute to Mariotti was given by Alta Tecnología Andina - ATA, the National School of Fine Arts in Lima and proyectoamil to mark the 50th anniversary of the "Projekt Geldmacher-Mariotti 1968" during the documenta4 in Kassel.

== Legacy ==
Mariotti died on 22 January 2026, at the age of 82.. On 29 November 2025, the Lima Art Museum and the Museum of Contemporary Art of Lima jointly organised the first major retrospective dedicated to the work of Mariotti and his partner María Luy. The curatorial project, led by Miguel López and José-Carlos Mariátegui along with a comprehensive publication accompanying the exhibition, extended across four galleries and 1,200 m2 at MALI and MAC Lima.

== Sources ==
- Buntinx, Gustavo. 1999. "El Retorno de las Luciérnagas: deseo aurático y voluntad chamánica en las tecnoesculturas de Francisco Mariotti." In (in)disciplinas. UNAM.
- Mariátegui, José-Carlos. "Peruvian Video/Electronic Art." Leonardo 35, no. 4 (2002): 355–63. https://www.jstor.org/stable/1577392.
- Mariátegui, José-Carlos. 2003. "Roger Atasi/Francesco Mariotti: deux génerations/une historie brève." Turbulences vidéo (39):16–17.
- Plagemann, Volker. 2000. "Geldmacher-Mariotti auf der 4. documenta 1968." In Klaus Geldmacher: Kunst und Politik, 30–45. Herausgeber / Kunstmuseum in derl Alten Post.
- Sánchez Castro, Rebeca. 2013. Entrada al campo inexplorado: Gran Guacamayo Precolombino de Francesco Mariotti en la Trienal de Chile 2009.
