= Susanne Rottenbacher =

German artist

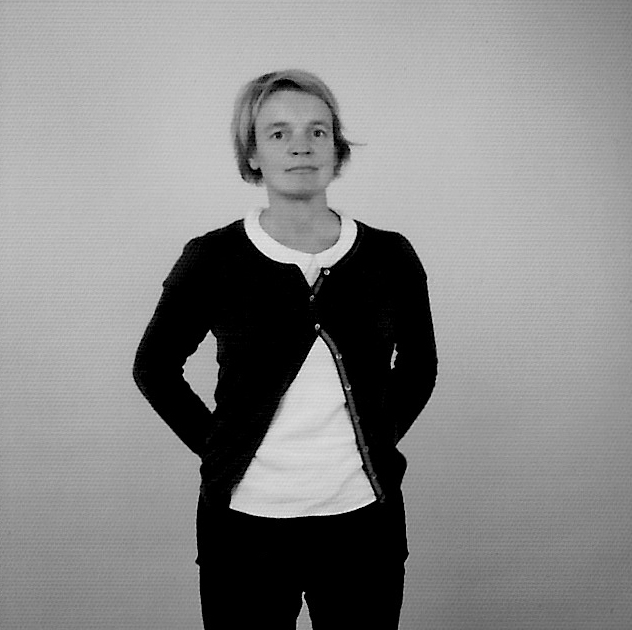
The artist at her studio, 2013

Susanne Rottenbacher (born 11 July 1969) is a German artist primarily concerned with light, color and installation.

== Life & Work ==
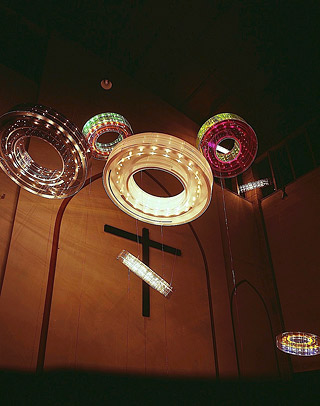
Installation "Freiheit!", Christuskirche, Cologne, 2012

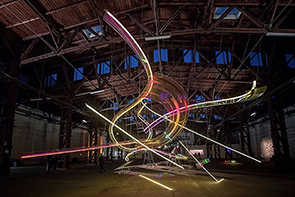
Installation "Disassembly". Museum of Now, Berlin, 2019

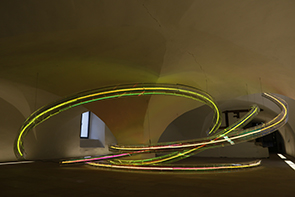
Installation "Colours in disorder", DA Kunsthaus Kloster Gravenhorst, 2019

Susanne Rottenbacher studied stage design at Barnard College from 1988 to 1991 in New York (B.A.) and then (1991-1992) completed a degree in light (MSc) at the Bartlett School of Architecture and Planning in London. She worked as a set designer at the Deutsche Oper Berlin and as a light designer for the "LichtKunstLicht" planning office. In this context, among other things, she designed the lighting design for the Federal Chancellery and the new government buildings. She has been working as a freelance light artist since 2007. Susanne Rottenbacher creates expansive installations from sculptural elements that can best be described as light-colored bodies. Her sculptures are characterised by great lightness and transparency and change in dialogue with the surrounding space and times of day. They penetrate the surrounding space like three-dimensional drawings and thus reinterpret it. The organically curved forms seem to be in dynamic motion and at the same time frozen in time and space.

== Awards ==
1991	Josephine Paddock Fellowship, Columbia University, New York City
1992	Henry Bartlett Travel Fellowship to Prague, University College London
2004	General Electric Edison Award of Excellence
2005	IIDA Award of Merit, Illuminating Engineering Society
2009	Nomination for "Targetti Light Art Award 2009"
2013	First prize (call for entry), C.O.R. building Düsseldorf, permanent installation "Gustaf"
2016	Artist in Residence, Centre of Contemporary Art, Centro Cultural Andratx Mallorca
2018	1st place KAB competition board area "Headquarters Evangelische Bank eG", Kassel
2022	Shortlist Nomination: Art in Architecture Competition Extension of the Federal Chancellery, Berlin

== Exhibitions (selection) ==
- 2007: LICHTBERLIN, Parcours Großer Tiergarten Berlin, Group exhibition
- 2008: "Berlin im Licht", Märkisches Museum, Berlin, Group exhibition
- 2010: Lichtparcours Braunschweig 2010, Group exhibition
- 2011: "MAX", Max-Planck-Institut, Berlin, Solo exhibition
- 2012: "Freiheit", Christuskirche Köln, Art Cologne, Solo exhibition
- 2013: TINA B., The Prague Contemporary Art Festival, GASK gallery (Czech Museum of Fine Arts)
- 2014: "Scheinwerfer, Lichtkunst in Deutschland im 21. Jahrhundert", Kunstmuseum Celle
- 2014: Art Dubai, Salsali Private Museum, Dubai
- 2015: The Looking Glass Room's Exploding Inevitable - 11m2, Berlin, Solo exhibition
- 2015: German Cool - SPM Salsali Private Museum, Dubai, Group exhibition
- 2016: "Unpainted LAB 3.0. (Nate Hitchcock)", Kesselhalle München, Group exhibition
- 2017: "Signal, Lichtkunst aus der Sammlung Robert Simon", Kunstmuseum Celle,
- 2017: La Biennale di Venezia, Group exhibition "Body and Soul", Palazzo Pisani, UNPAINTED art fair
- 2017: "Disassembly", BOX Freiraum, Berlin, Solo exhibition
- 2018: Haus am Waldsee im Bikini Berlin, "The Twist 01", Solo exhibition
- 2018: "Border Matters", Kunsthalle 1, Centre of Contemporary Art, Centro Cultural Andratx Mallorca, Group exhibition
- 2018: "Commedia della Luce", Gallery SER, Centro Cultural Andratx Mallorca, Solo exhibition
- 2019 "Museum of Now", Berlin Art Society, Berlin, Group exhibition
- 2019 "Winterlicht", DA Kunsthaus Kloster Gravenhorst, Solo exhibition
- 2020 "PArt-Producers Art Platform", Rene Spiegelberger Stiftung, Hamburg, Group exhibition (digital)
- 2020 "In einem anderen Licht", Kunsthaus Dahlem Berlin, Solo exhibition
- 2021 "Im Schein der Sterne", Museum Starnberger See, Group Exhibition
- 2022 "In Love With Tomorrow", solo exhibition Swarovski Crystal Worlds Vienna
- 2023 "Berlin-Seoul", group exhibition, Bermel von Luxburg Gallery in cooperation CHOI&CHOI Gallery SEOUL, Korea
- 2024 "Light Without Borders", The Small Museum - Culture on the Peunt, Weissenstadt
- 2025 Spark Art Fair Vienna, solo presentation
