= Hans Kotter (artist) =

German artist (born 1966)

Hans Kotter (born 1966 in Muhldorf am Inn, Bayern, Germany) is a German artist whose art consists of lighting effects and color interacting with the environment.

== Life and art ==
After growing up in Germany, from 1993–94, Hans Kotter studied at the Art Students League of New York. This educational basis was further built upon with studies at the Media Design Academy in Munich from 2001-3. In 2004, Kotter was awarded the Kulturpreis Bayern (Bayern Culture Prize) by E.ON Bayern AG in the art and architecture category. He has lived and worked in Berlin since 2003. 2007-13, he has been a Lecturer at the Staatliche Akademie der Bildenden Künste in Stuttgart.

He works with photography, conceptual, light and installation art. The light sculptures that he is best known integrate mirrors and color-changing lights or incorporate the photographs, Kotter produces by shooting light reflecting off of various prisms. Appearing in exhibitions with Adolf Luther, Heinz Mack, Otto Piene, François Morellet, Kotter is able to create works that are constantly in flux and open to viewer interaction

Hans Kotter’s work focuses on the physical, artistic elements of light, color, and space. He is interested in the changing appearance of these elements under different physical conditions. He creates both small individual works of art and large-scale installations, which rely on light and often integrate photography.

Kotter’s work has been exhibited at numerous galleries and museums throughout Europe and the United States since the early 1990s. His work is included in international collections including the Borusan Collection in Istanbul; Kinetica Museum in London; Targetti Light Art Collection in Florence, Italy; Museum Ritter in Waldenbuch, Germany; Osthaus Museum in Hagen, Germany; the Kunstmuseum Celle, Germany; MAKK Museum für Angewandte Kunst Köln (Museum of Applied Art, Cologne), Germany; Villa Datris in L’Islesur la Sorgue, France; and the Topping Rose House in Bridgehampton, NY; among others.

== Artwork ==
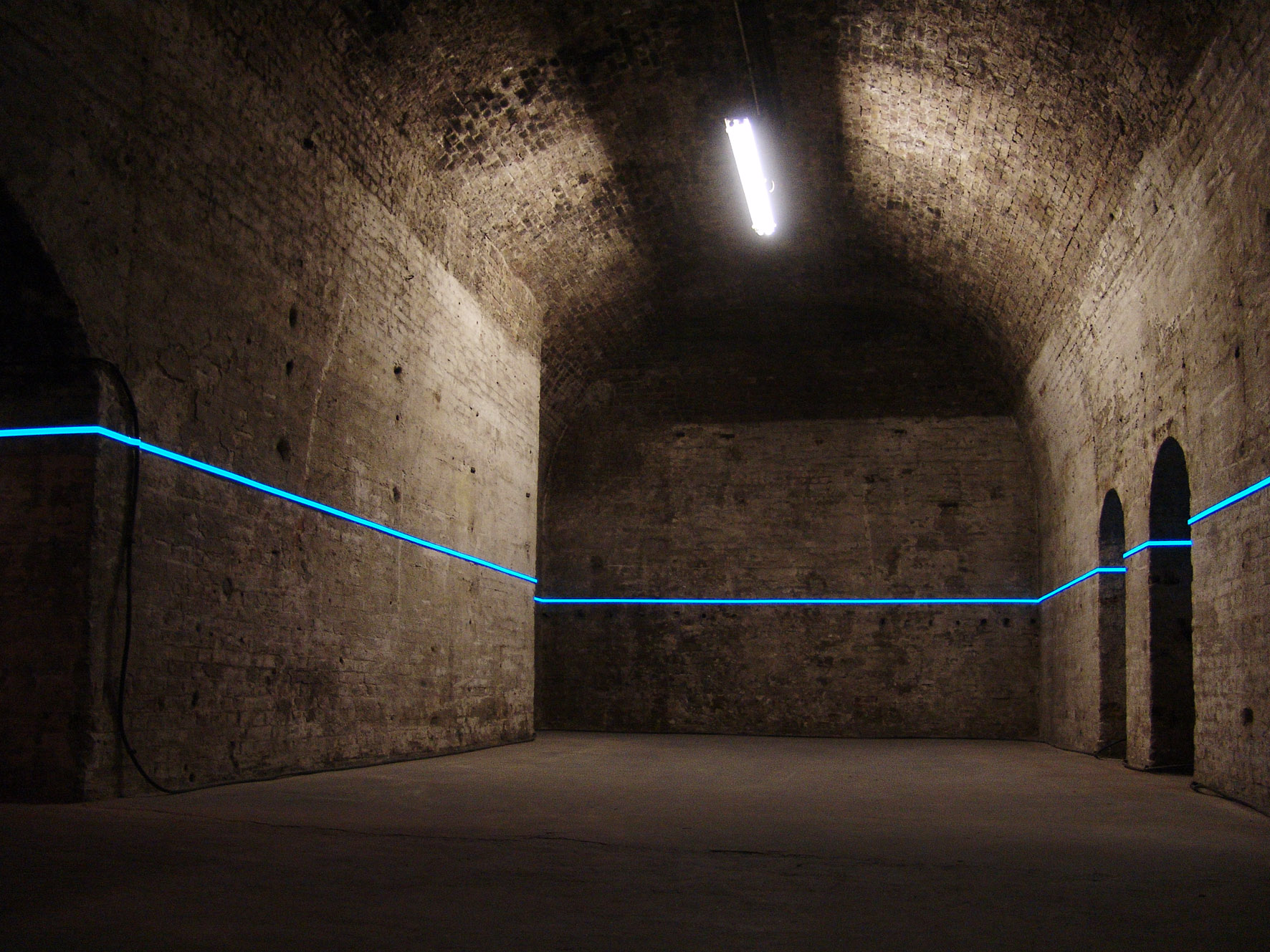
Balance, Shunt London, Kinetica Museum London - 2008

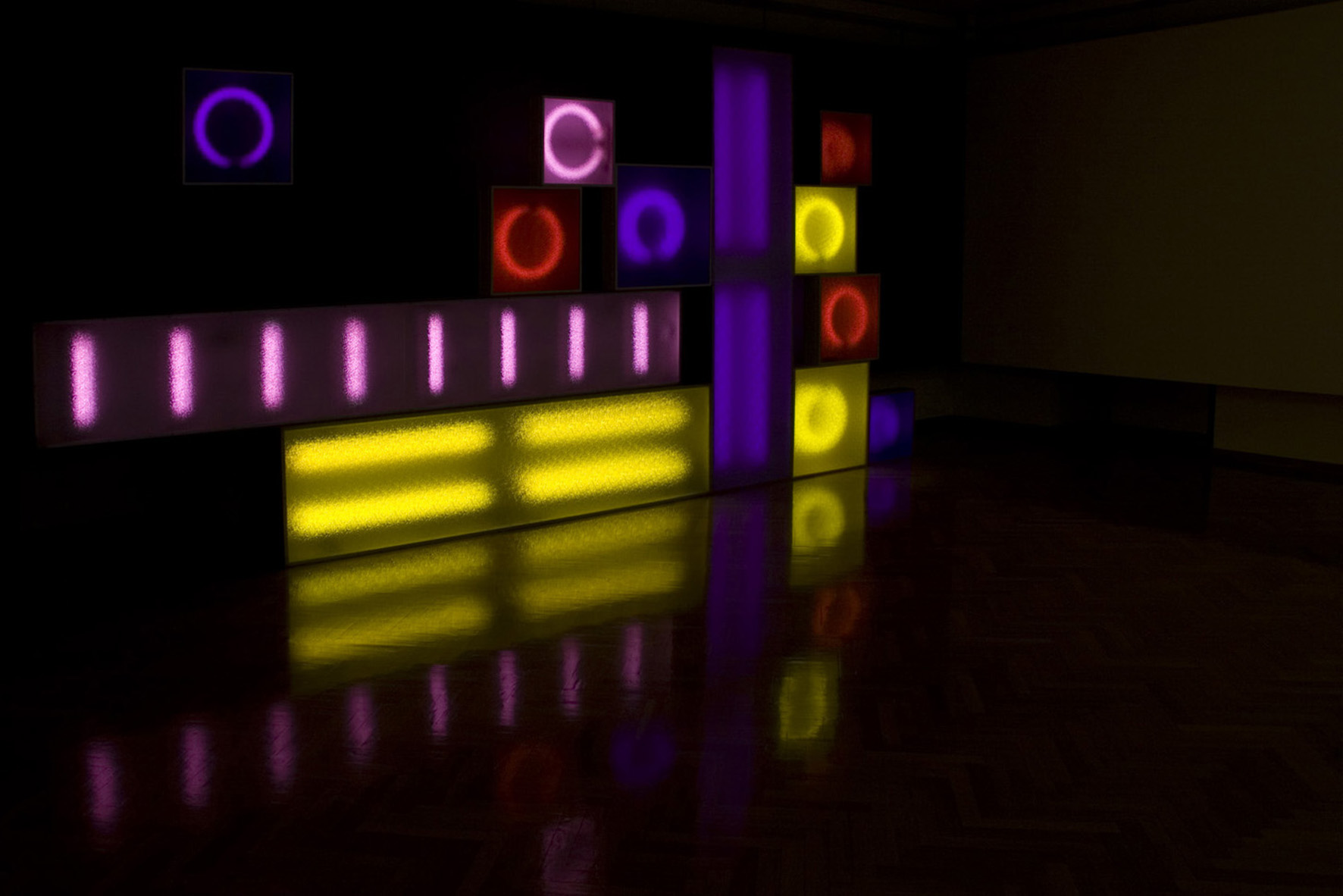
Replaced, 2008

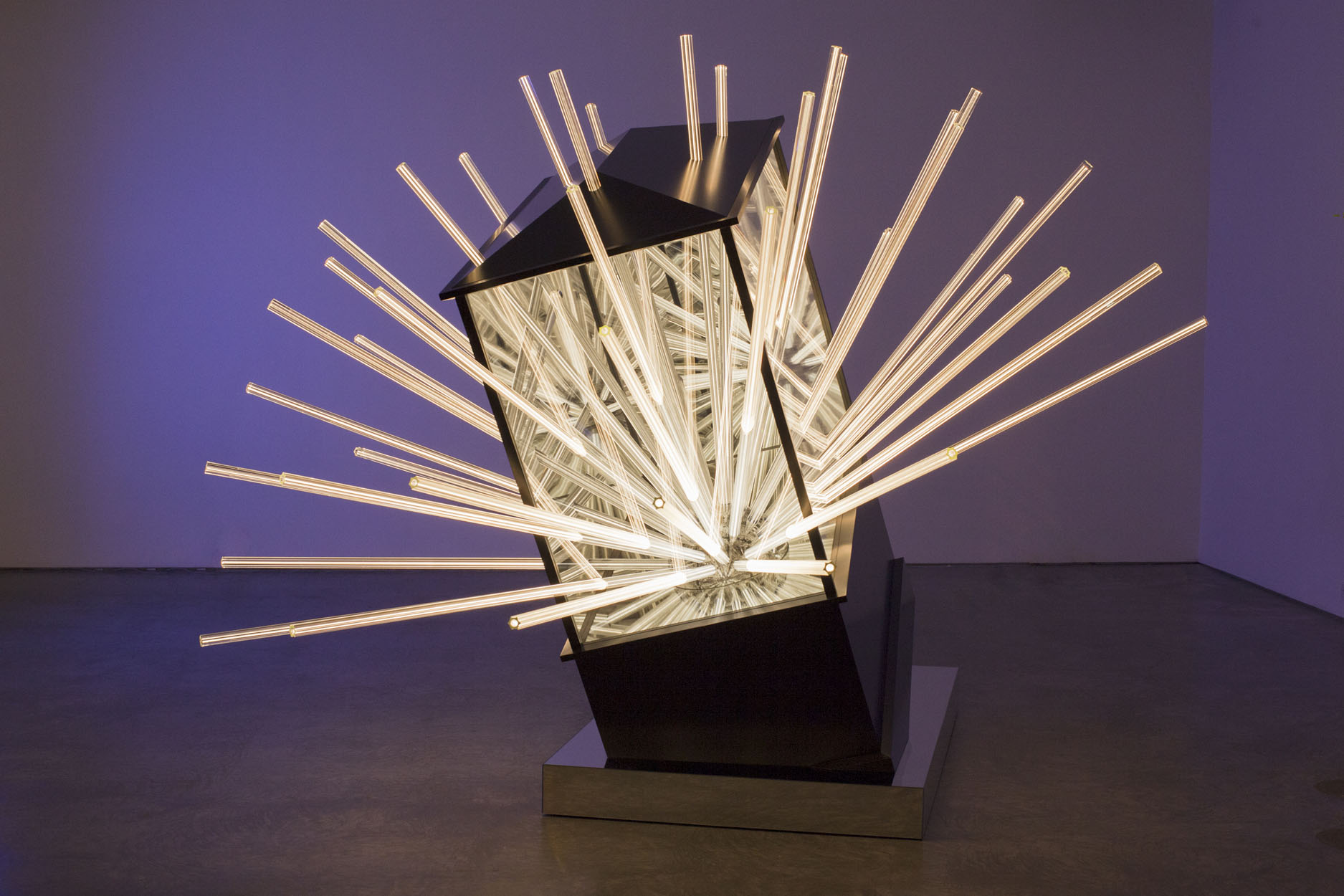
Big Bang….Interruption!, 2013

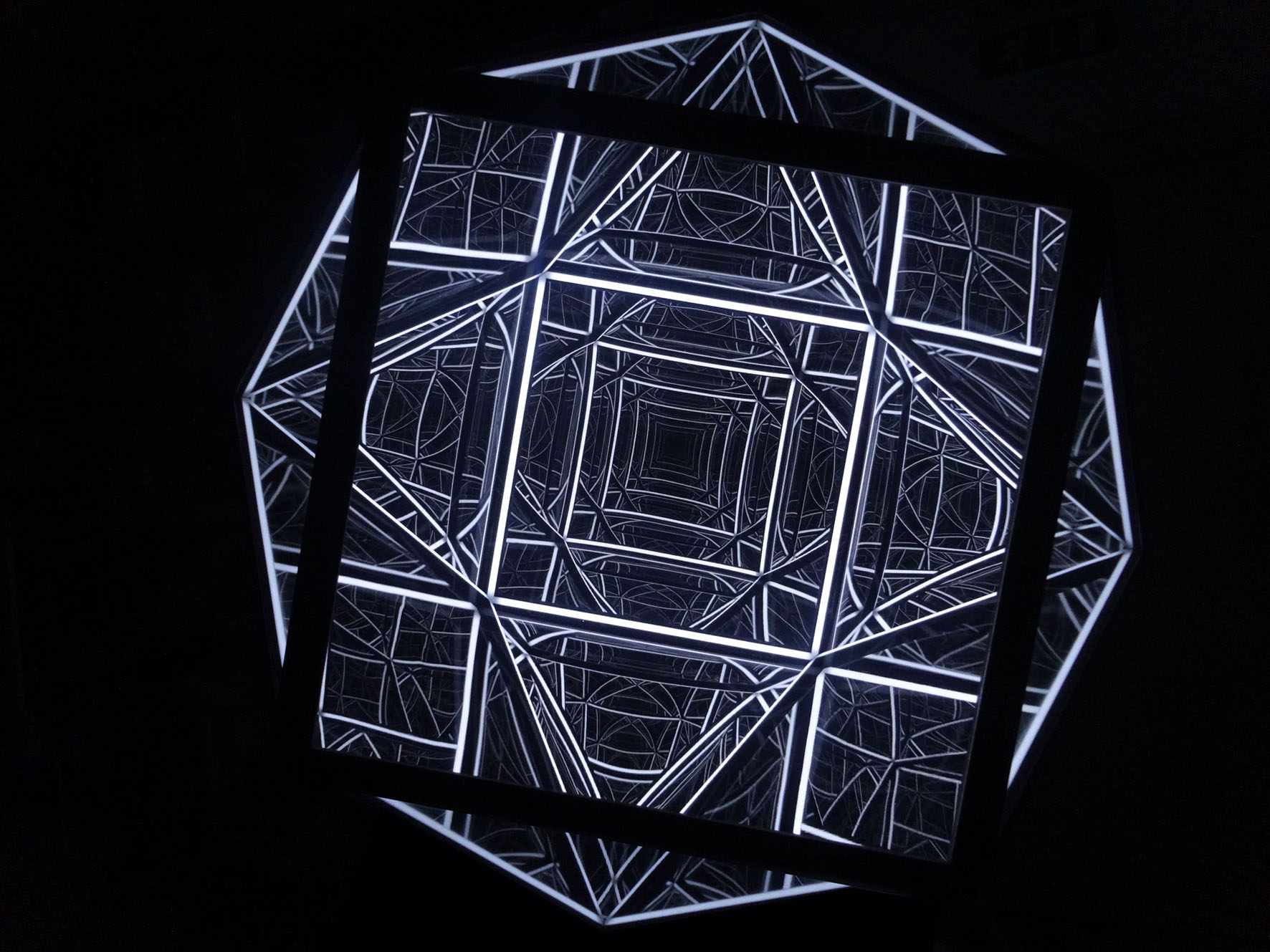
Point of View, 2017

== Literature ==
- Hans Kotter: Beyond Light Samuelis Baumgarte Galerie, 2016. ISBN 978-3-9816408-3-0
- Annett Zinsmeister, Kai-Uwe Hemken: Hans Kotter: Light Flow. GlobalArtAffairs, Bonn 2012, ISBN 978-3-941763-10-4.
- Hans Kotter: De Buck Gallery New York (Hrsg.), 2011, ISBN 978-0-615-54435-9
- Hans Kotter: Replaced. Galerie Michaela Stock, Wien 2009, OCLC 699508829.
- Peter Lodermeyer: Hans Kotter: Colour Rush. GlobalArtAffairs Publishing, New York, 2007, ISBN 978-0-9745148-7-1.
- Bezirk Oberbayern, Stadtmuseum Neuötting (Hrsg.): Hans Kotter: 1992 - 2002. Selbstverlag, 2002, ISBN 3-00-010162-4.
- Hans Kotter: Lichtempfindlich, Sensitive to Light. Galerie Benden & Klimczak, Viersen 1999, OCLC 247038519.
