= Miguel Ángel López =

Miguel Ángel López may refer to:

- Miguel Ángel López-Cedrón (born 1978), Spanish footballer
- Miguel Ángel López (cyclist) (born 1994), Colombian cyclist
- Miguel Ángel López (footballer) (1942–2025), Argentinian football player and manager of Club América
- Miguel Ángel López Jaén (born 1982), Spanish tennis player
- Miguel Ángel López (racewalker) (born 1988), Spanish racewalker
- Miguel Ángel López Velasco (1956–2011), Mexican journalist
- Miguel Ángel López (volleyball) (born 1997), Cuban volleyball player
- Rey Misterio (Miguel Ángel López Díaz, 1955–2024), Mexican professional wrestler
