= Alfonso Castrillon =

Peruvian curator

Alfonso Castrillón Vizcarra (born 1935 in Lima, Peru) is a prominent intellectual in the study of museums and art in Latin America. He is currently the director of the Visual Arts Gallery of the Ricardo Palma URP University, of Lima (since 1997), founding-director of the Institute of Artistic and Museological Research of the Universidad Ricardo Palma (in 2002) and creator and coordinator of the Master in Museology at the same university (since 1999). He also runs the Illapa Mana Tukukuq journal.

He was director of the Banco Continental Gallery, in Lima (1973–1979) and director of the Institute of Contemporary Art (IAC). His most prominent book Museos Peruanos Utopia y Realidad touches on problems related to museum planning, the methodology to be followed to build new museums and, finally, contributes with a theory of the museum script and a critical survey on museums in Peru

In addition, he is a museologist, art critic and university teacher, has published numerous articles in Lima newspapers and magazines, most of which are published in his book The Eye of the Razor or the Edge of the Storm (Lima, 2001) and Las Buenas Intenciones (2019).

He studied at the Universitá degli Studi de Roma and became Doctor of Philosophy and Letters at the University Complutense of Madrid. He taught at the National University of San Marcos in Lima. He was also a UNESCO / UNDP Consultant to organize the School of Museology of the Colombian Institute of Culture (Bogotá). In addition to director of the Government Commission of the Museum of Archeology. He also founded the General Direction of Museums at the Ministry of Culture in Peru.
