= Jan van Munster =

Dutch sculptor and installation artist (1939–2024)

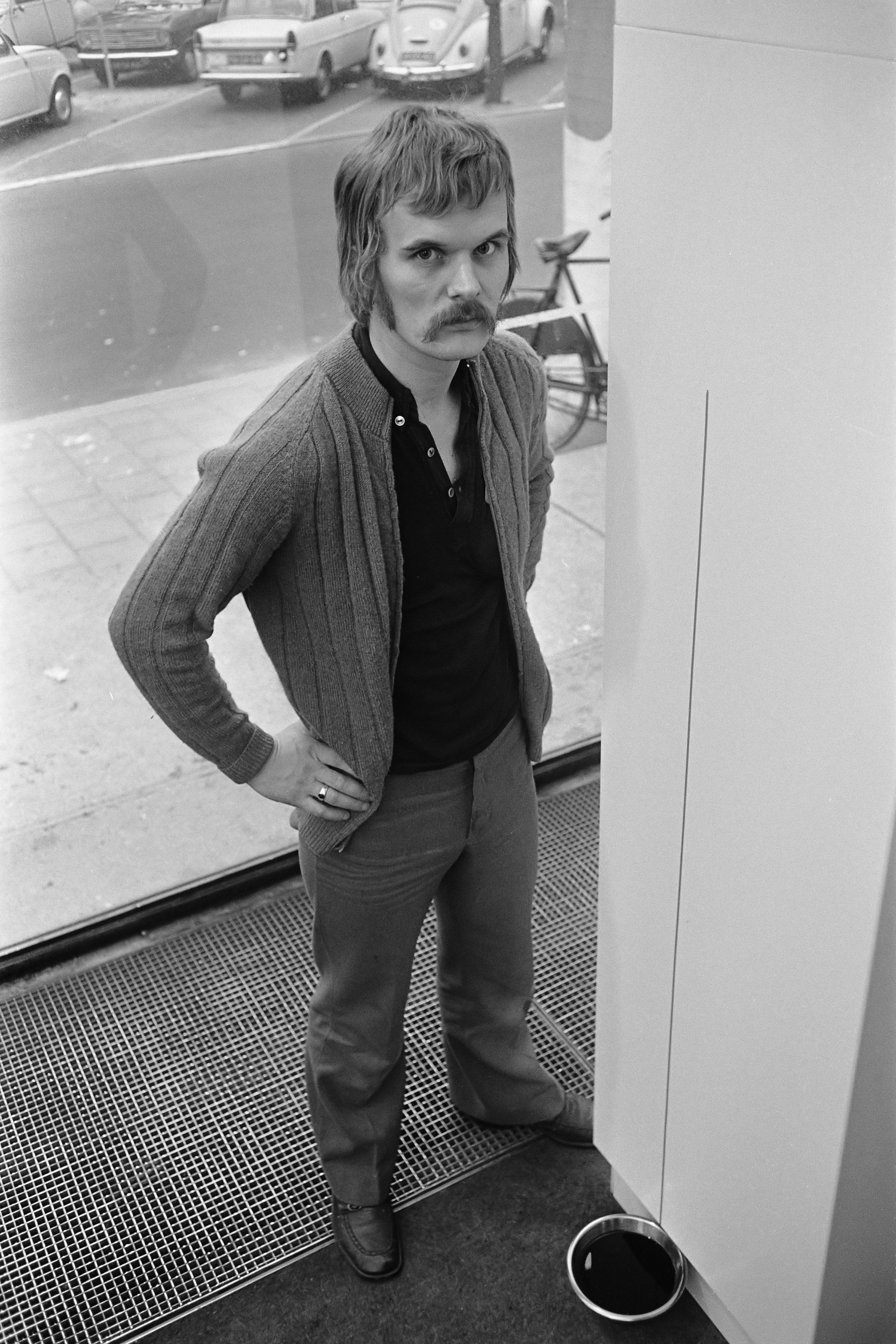
- Van Munster in 1969
- Born: 3 July 1939; Gorinchem, Netherlands
- Died: 28 May 2024 (aged 84)
- Website: http://www.janvanmunster.nl

Jan Nicolaas van Munster (Gorinchem, 3 July 1939 – 28 May 2024) was a Dutch sculptor and installation artist whose work appears in many public places in the Netherlands and Germany.

== Biography ==
Van Munster studied from 1955 to 1957 at the Academy of Fine Arts and Applied Sciences in Rotterdam, and from 1957 to 1960 at the Instituut voor Kunstnijverheidsonderwijs in Amsterdam.

After graduation van Munster settled as independent artist in Gorinchem. In 1967 he moved to Rotterdam, where he worked until 1985. From 1987 to 1991 he worked is Noordwelle, Schouwen-Duiveland, from 1989 to 2003 in Renesse, Schouwen-Duiveland, and afterwards in Vlissingen.

In 1966 he received the A. Schwartz Prize, in 1971 the Hendrik Chabot Prize, and in 2002 the Wilhelmina-ring. From 1968 to 1970 he was a lecturer at the Ateliers '63 in Haarlem, from 1974 to 1977 at the Rotterdam Art Academy and from 1978 to 1990 at the Academy of Art and Design St. Joost 's-Hertogenbosch.

Van Munster was the initiator and founder of the IK foundation (Stichting IK; based on his "IK" works). Since 2011, this foundation has managed an artist residency and exhibition space located in a former water tower and adjacent buildings in the Dutch village Oost-Souburg.

Van Munster died on 28 May 2024, at the age of 84.

== Work ==
Van Munster’s work is minimalist in nature. He worked in wood, stone, bronze, glass, and other materials, and has also produced light sculptures and video art. The focus of his work was on all forms of energy as a metaphor for life, with an emphasis on light and the energy with which it is loaded.

Tensions and oppositions, for example, between light and dark or heat and cold, are often illustrated in his work.

His notable projects include the Plus-Minus initiative, and the “IK” works. His works can be found in many cities in the Netherlands and Germany, in public spaces and museum and private collections. One of his works is part of the collection of the Centre for International Light Art (CILA) in Unna, Germany.

== In popular culture ==
Van Munster's 1981 work Energie-Piek ijs was pictured on the inside cover of the 1988 Joy Division compilation CD Substance, while his light sculpture Plus et Min featured on the inner sleeve art of the reissued single Atmosphere released from the same album. The latter in turn inspired the title and artwork of the band's compilation box set +- Singles 1978-80.

External links to the artwork: Energie-Piek ijs and Plus et Min, the alphabet used is designed by Wim Crouwel a graphic designer who is also Dutch.

== Exhibitions ==
- 1987: Wilhelm-Hack-Museum, Ludwigshafen
- 2001: Museum van Hedendaagse Kunst, Antwerp
- 2004: Die Energie des Bildhauers, Wilhelm-Hack-Museum, Ludwigshafen
- 2005: Zentrum für Kunst und Medientechnologie (ZKM), Karlsruhe

== Sculptures Gallery ==
=== Sculptures in the Netherlands ===
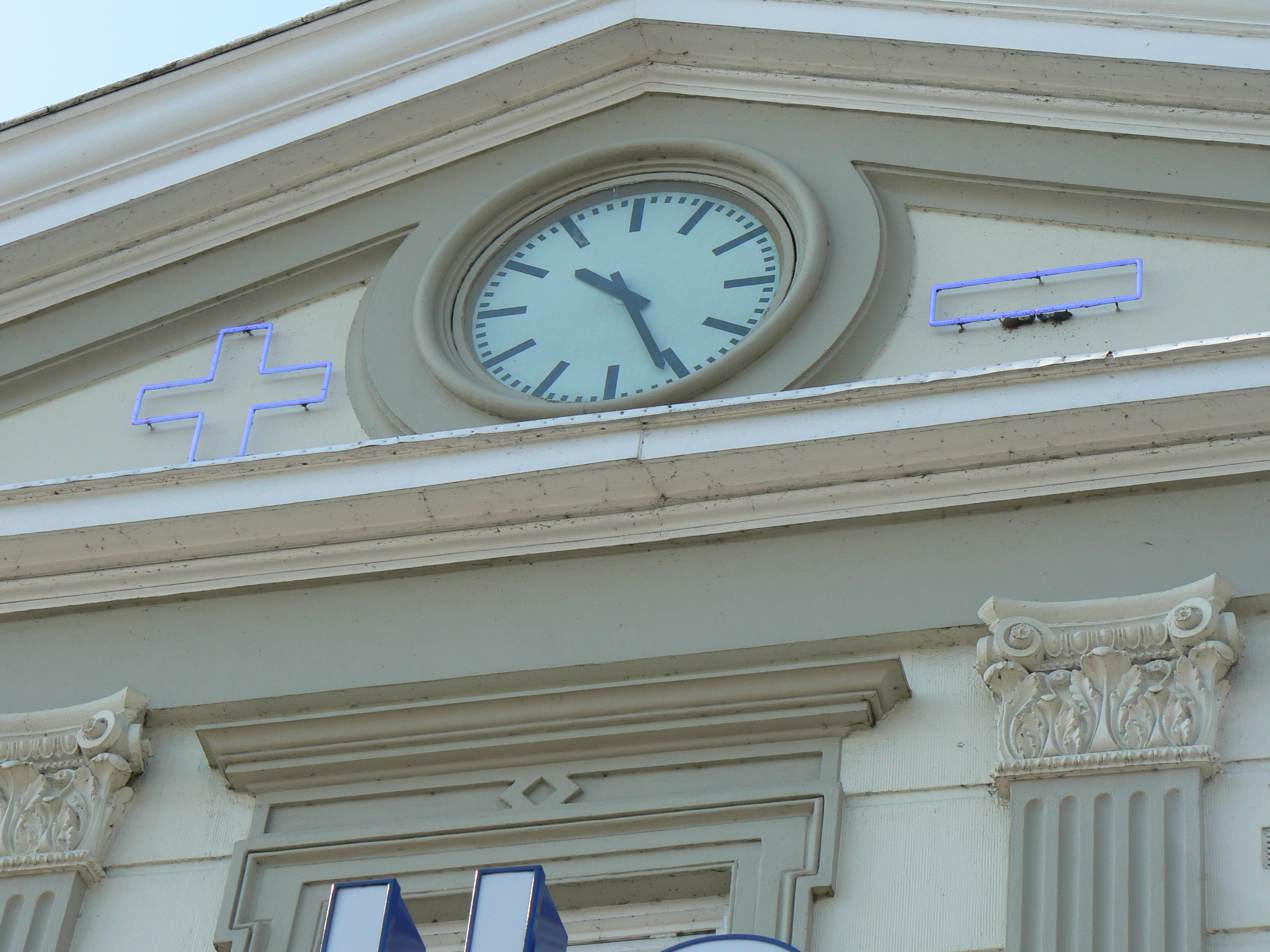
Energiesculptuur (1988), Zwolle

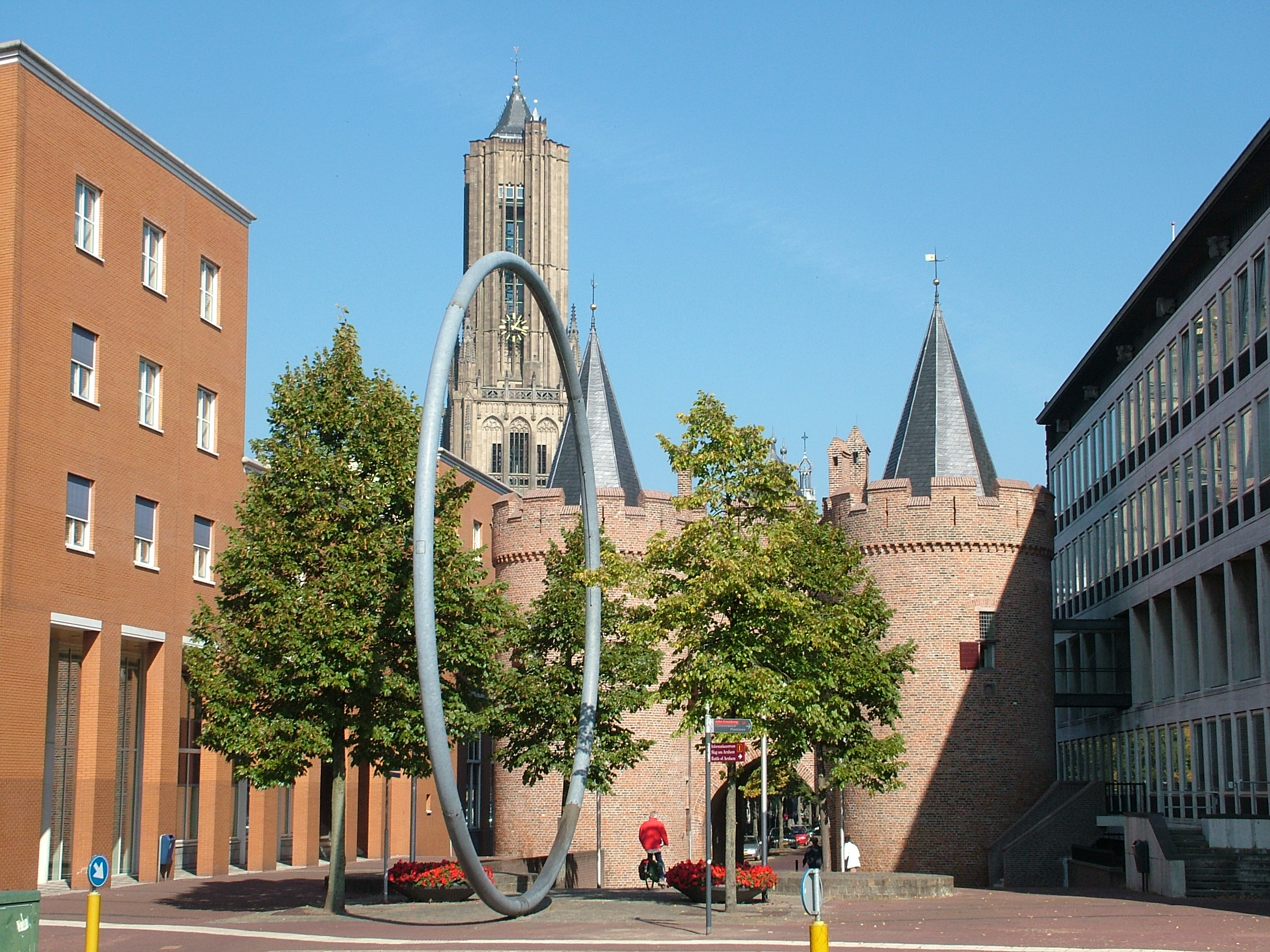
Energiering (2002), Arnhem

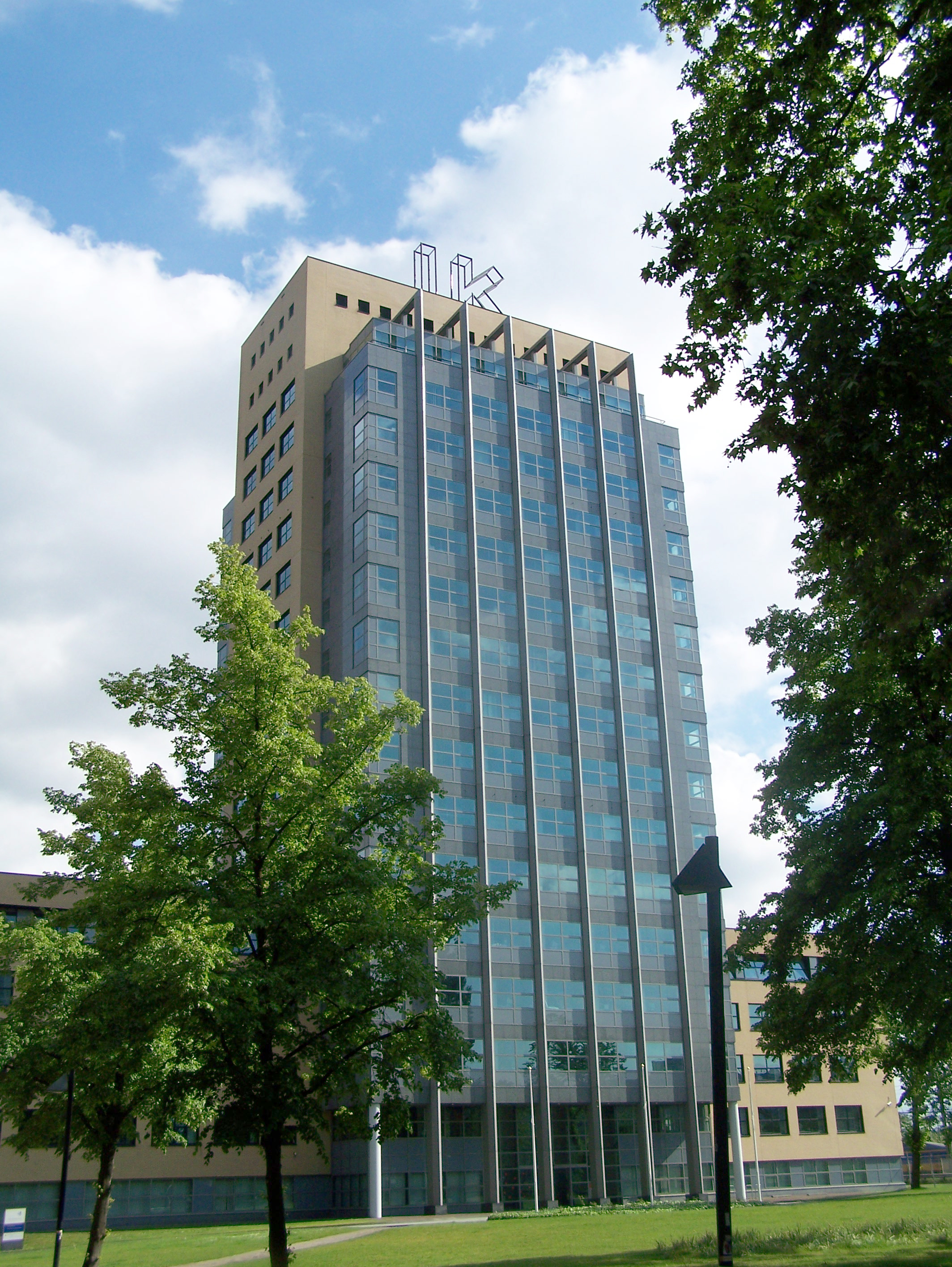
IK voor Utrecht (2003), Utrecht

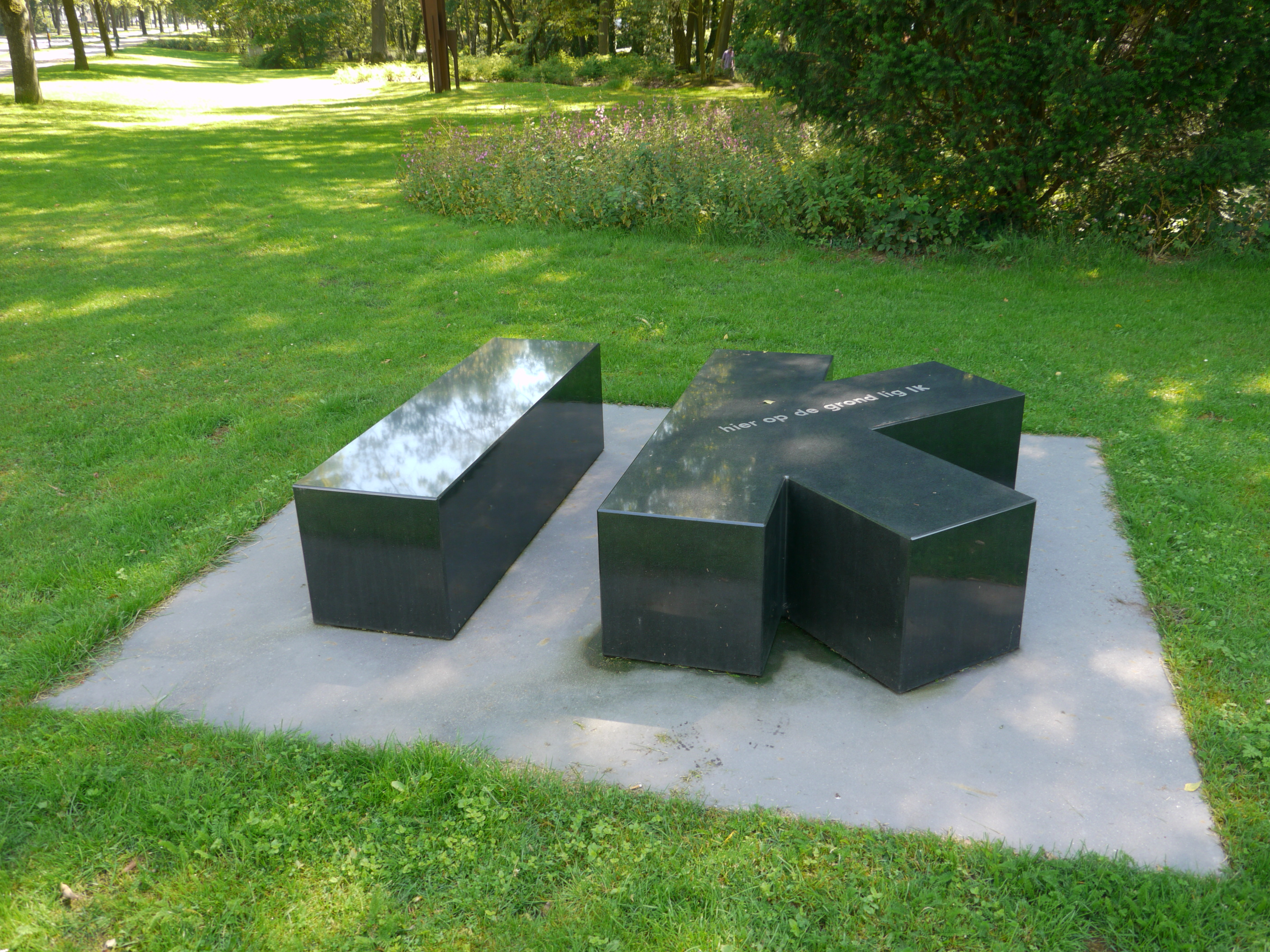
IK (2003), Apeldoorn

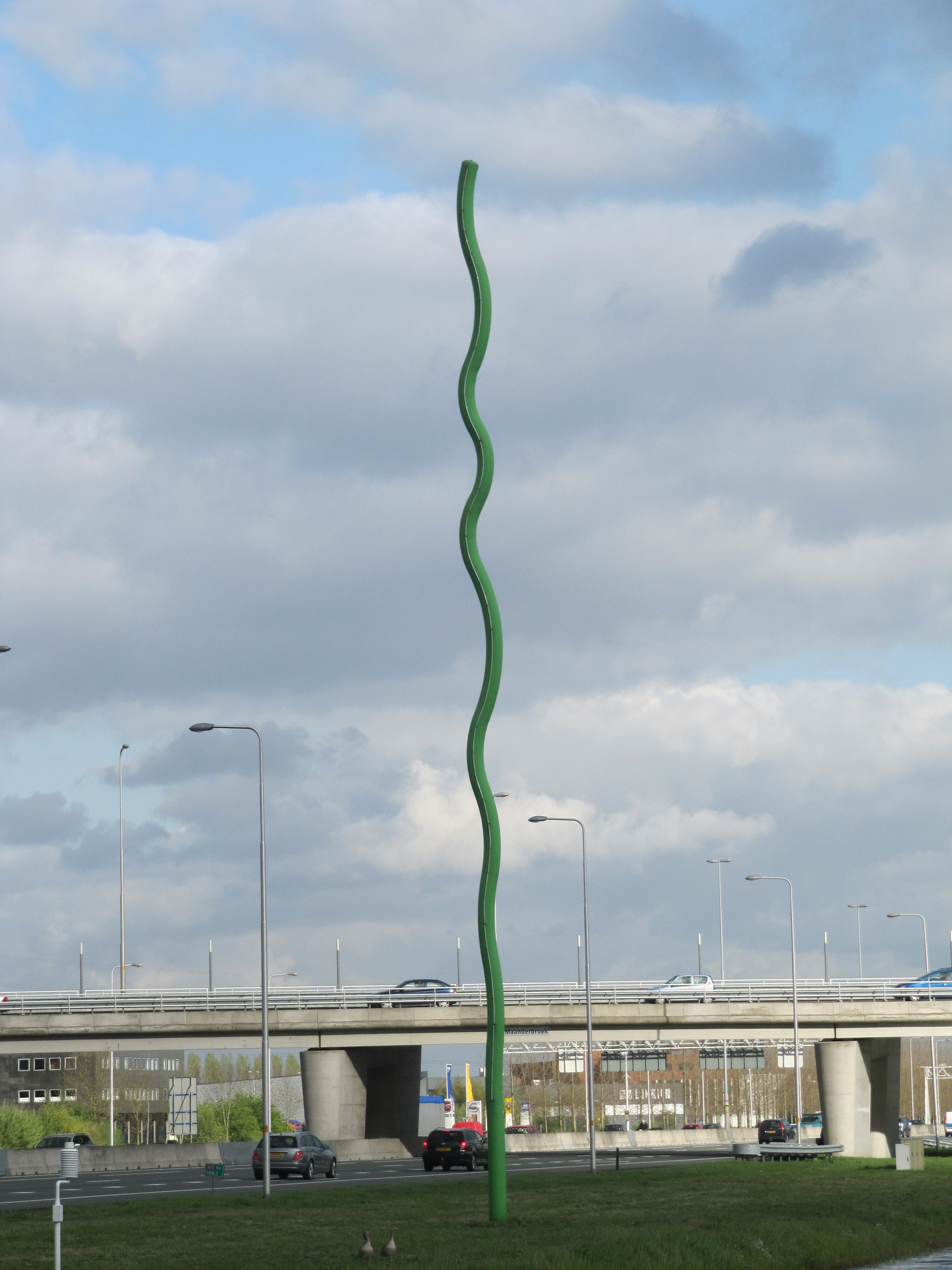
Grasspriet met veel energie (2004), Ede

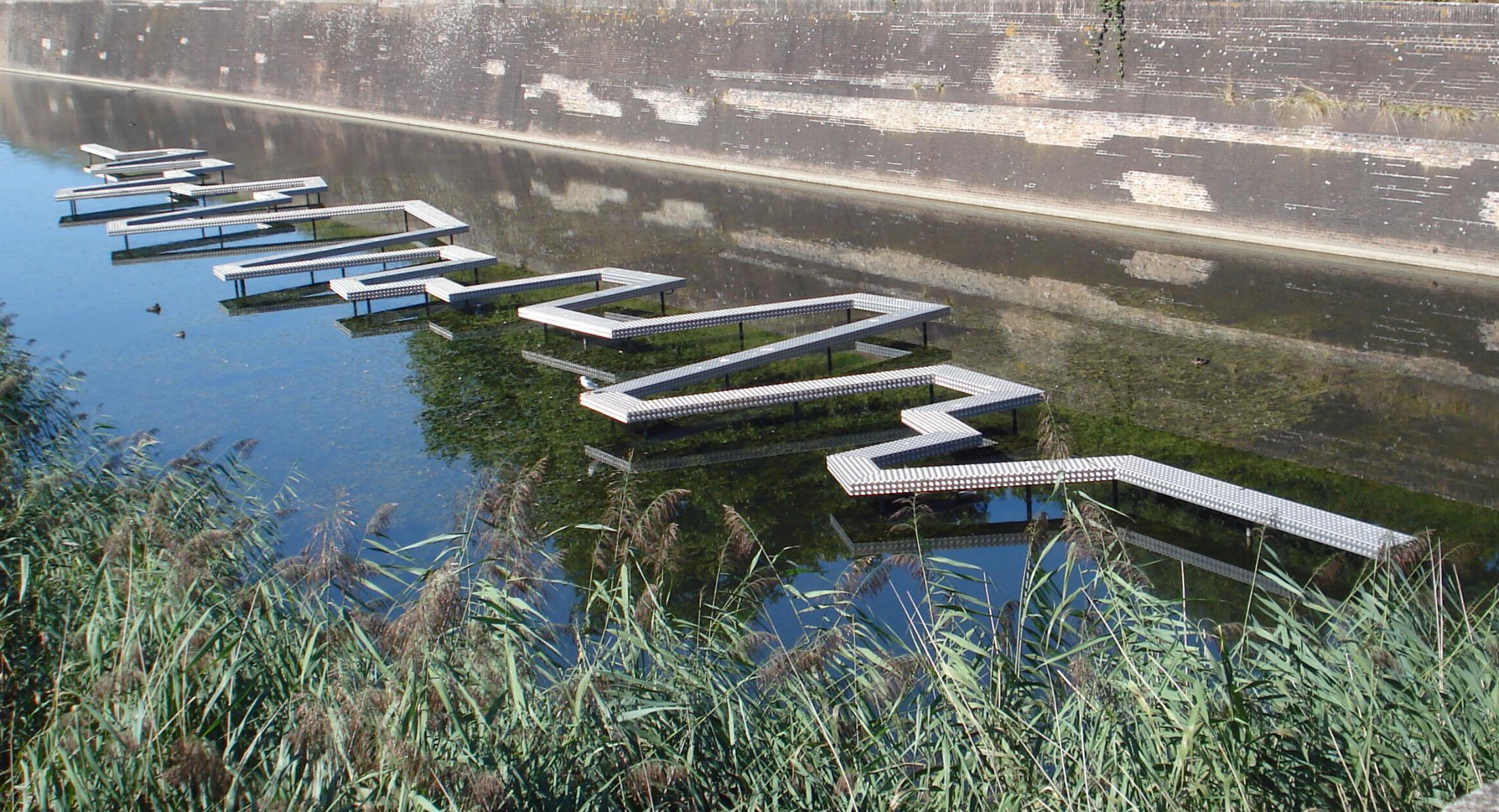
Brainwave (2005), Gorinchem

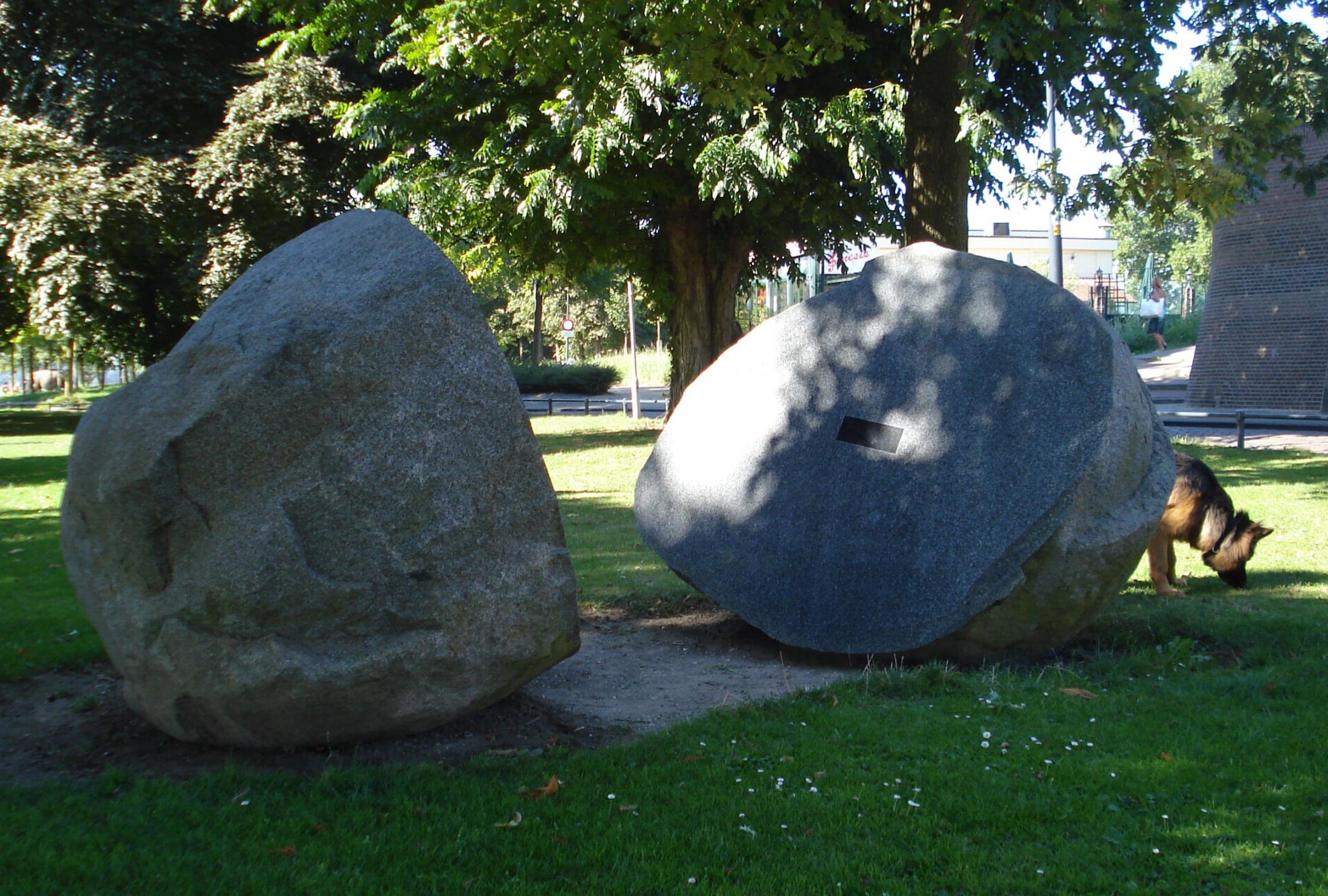
Plusminus, Gorinchem

=== Sculptures in Germany ===
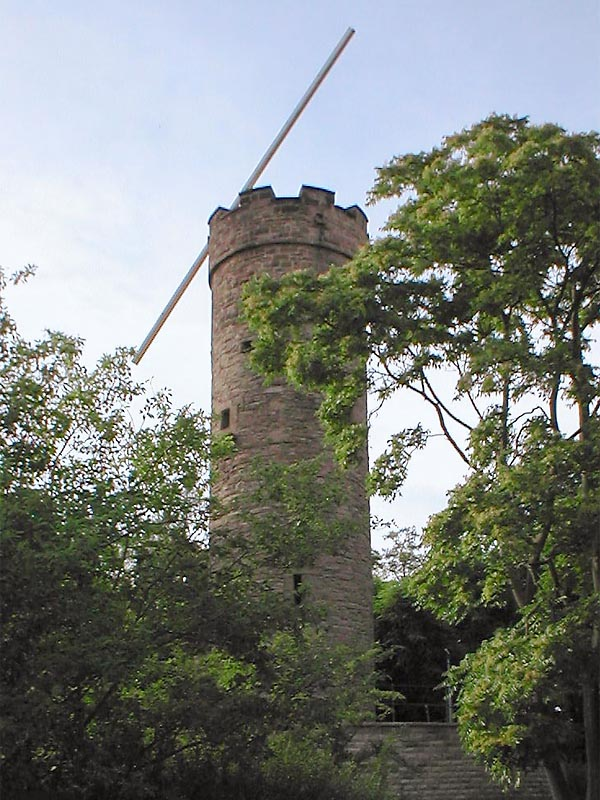
Sonnenstrahl für Heilbronn, Heilbronn

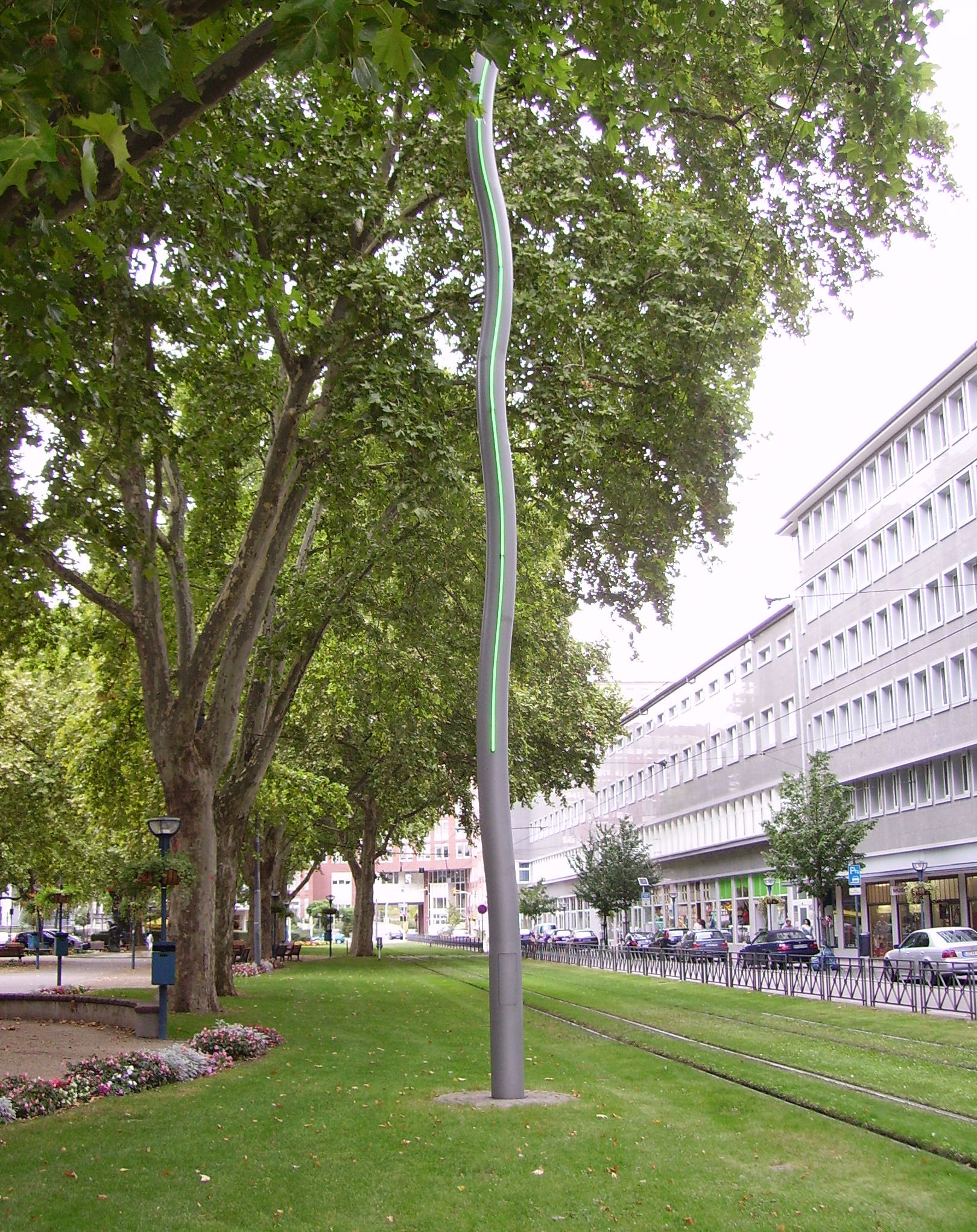
Lichtsäule, Ludwigshafen

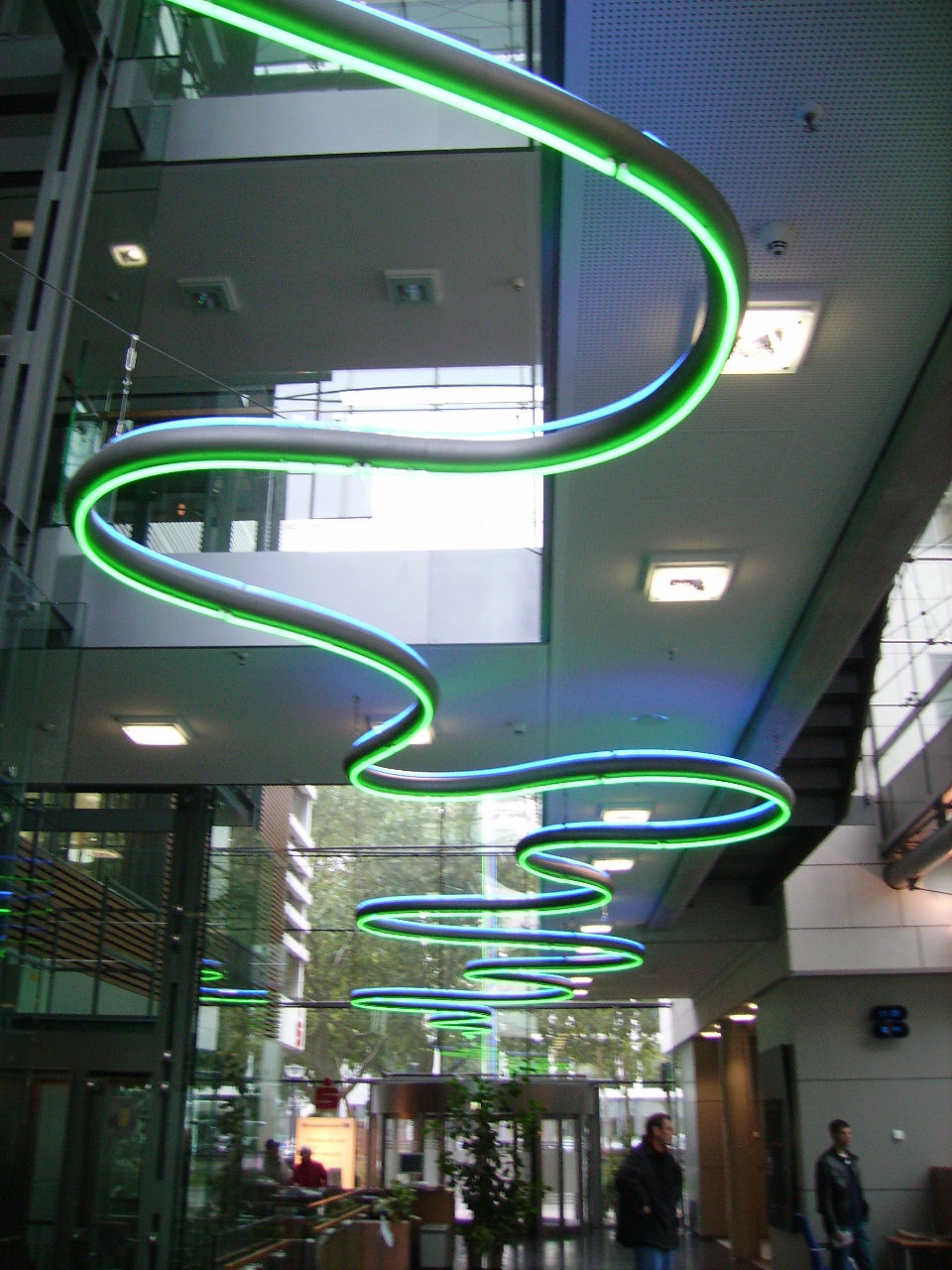
Brainwave, Ludwigshafen
