= Friedrichshain Photo Gallery =

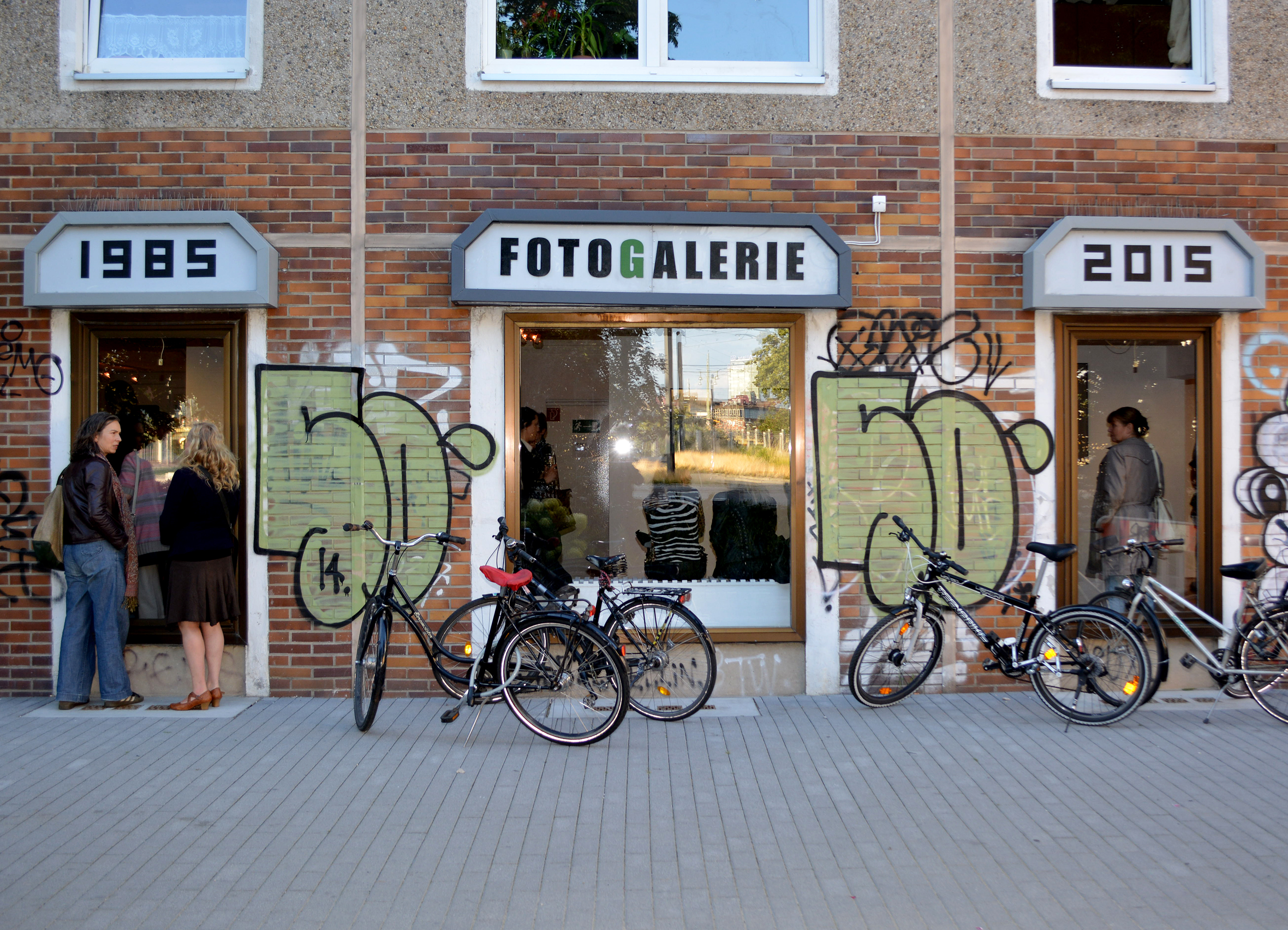
Front view of the Friedrichshain Photo Gallery

The Friedrichshain Photo Gallery (German: Fotogalerie Friedrichshain) is the oldest communal photo gallery in Berlin. Founded in 1985, it was the first gallery in the GDR which devoted itself exclusively to the medium of photography. Today it is located at Helsingforser Platz 1 in Berlin-Friedrichshain, not far from the S-train station Warschauer Straße, and has been operated since 2002 by Kulturring in Berlin eV. The emphasis is on social documentary photography.

In August 2015 the Friedrichshain Photo Gallery celebrated its thirtieth anniversary with a great look back on its previous work. In addition to numerous photographers who have shaped the gallery and photography, co-founder Ralf Herzig also officially returned to the gallery for the first time.

== Selected artists ==
- Cecil Beaton
- Sibylle Bergemann
- Dietmar Bührer
- Imogen Cunningham
- Arno Fischer
- Harald Hauswald
- Eugen Heilig
- Ute Mahler
- Sven Marquardt
- Roger Melis
- Tina Modotti
- Helga Paris
- Gordon Parks
- Richard Peter
- Evelyn Richter
- Willy Römer
- Sebastião Salgado
- Rudolf Schäfer
- Eva Siao
- Jindřich Štreit
- Ulrich Wüst
