= Dorothea Melis =

German fashion journalist

- Born: Dorothea Voigt; 22 February 1938; Berlin, Germany
- Died: 29 June 2015 (aged 77); Berlin, Germany
- Education: Berlin-Weißensee Visual and Applied Arts academy
- Occupation: Fashion journalist
- Spouse(s): 1957: Axel Bertram; 1970: Roger Melis (1940–2009)
- Children: Dr. Mathias Bertram
- Awards: "Prix Ricard" (2000); Villa Medici artist in residence (2002–2003)

Dorothea Melis (born Dorothea Voigt: 22 February 1938 – 29 June 2015) was a German fashion journalist.

== Life ==
=== Early years ===
Dorothea Voigt was born in Berlin. Her father worked as an architect. She grew up with her family in Berlin's Weissensee quarter, ending up after the war in the Soviet occupation zone, which would be relaunched in October 1949 as the Soviet sponsored German Democratic Republic (East Germany). She studied fashion and design at the Berlin-Weißensee Visual and Applied Arts academy. At the end of the course students were required to submit a dissertation. Voigt completed her degree in 1960 with a dissertation that was savagely critical of East Germany's popular fashion magazine, "Sibylle" which had been founded in 1956, a few years earlier: she was repelled by the publication's staid fashions, its pathetic poses and its housewifely approach. Margot Pfannstiel, editor-in-chief at "Sibylle", became aware of Dorothea's dissertation and spotted an opportunity. The women met: "I've read your work: it's most interesting. If you know it all with such clarity, then start here. Do [the fashion section] yourself, and make it better" ("Ich habe Ihre Arbeit gelesen, ist ja interessant. Wenn Sie alles so genau wissen, dann fangen Sie mal hier an. Und machen das mal, und zwar besser.") In 1961 the 23-year-old was recruited to the magazine, mandated to create a modern socialist image for women.

=== Sibylle ===
- "Back then women were so much more creative than they are today: they'd take the cotton we were getting from somewhere like Uzbekistan and dye or embroider it to rework classic looks we'd seen tourists wearing, on television or in magazines from the West. .... we'd have one editor, one photographer and two models on an average photo shoot. We had to do everything ourselves, there was no huge team like they have today. We'd all have to double up. The editor would do the girls' make-up, the photographer would also be the driver. It was a very intense experience."

Dorothea Melis recalling her time with Sibylle in conversation with the photographer Günter Rubitzsch, quoted by Jane Paulick

Dorothea Voigt married the graphic artist and illustrator Axel Bertram in 1957. By the time the marriage ended in 1961 it had produced a son who stayed with his mother after the parents parted. By the time she died Dorothea would also be a grandmother. It was as Dorothea Bertram that she headed up Sibylle's fashion department between 1961 and 1970. Recruiting a new generation of photographers such as, most notably, Arno Fischer, Günter Rössler and Roger Melis, she worked to define a new concept in fashion, based around the theme of a modern, self-assured, educated working woman, integrated into contemporary culture. Sources credit her with having introduced the mini-skirt to the German Democratic Republic in 1967. Despite her iconic status the head of fashion at Easy Germany's fashion magazine was still subject to some of the usual constraints. When she turned up to work wearing an elegant pair of jeans, the editor in chief asked her firmly not to wear "these American pants ... for work" ("... bitte nicht im Betrieb, mit diesen amerikanischen Hosen").

Towards the end of the decade there was a change at the top of Sibylle, when Margot Pfannstiel moved on, succeeded as editor in chief by Yvonne Freyer, "a party loyalist", in October 1968. Ingeburg Lange, as chair of Women's Commission of the powerful Party Central Committee ("Frauenkommission des Zentralkomitees") was by now speaking out in favour of a switch to a "more popular approach" for the magazine, and the pages increasingly prioritised "arts and crafts" and folkloric themes. The "advice column" section expanded. As the fashion photographer Ute Mahler later recalled, there was nothing so simple as state censorship. "We always did what we wanted. The trouble came afterwards, if we had not aligned our ideas of beauty and fashion with those of the Women's Commission of the Central Committee." The result was a growing level of self-censorship and frustration. Dorothea Bertram left "Sibylle" in 1970.

=== VEB Exquisit ===
Dorothea Bertram was a huge admirer of the work of the fashion photographer Roger Melis, and in 1970 the two of them were married. Between 1970 and 1990 – now with her considerable reputation secured in the East German fashion world – Dorothea Melis worked for the upmarket clothing retail chain VEB Exquisit. The business had been established in 1962 by order of the Council of Ministers, through a conviction, they said, that East German citizens should be able to obtain luxury goods without being forced to involve themselves (illegally) in using western money (known colloquially as "Westgeld"). Dorothea Melis was responsible for press and public relations. This also involved organising fashion shows. The company sold high-quality modern clothing, much of it imported, which was differentiated from more mainstream "off-the-peg" fashion products through its sophisticated design concepts and its insistence on high-quality manufacturing. In some ways the business expanded beyond its original niche: sources claim that at its peak, with 44 outlets, it accounted for almost 30% of East Germany's clothing sales by value.

=== Beyond the change ===
After several years during which the winds of Glasnost blowing across from, of all places, Moscow, found a growing resonance in East German cities, in November 1989 street protestors broke through the Berlin Wall. It very quickly became obvious that the Soviet troops had received no instructions to intervene, as they had back in 1953, and the self-confidence of the political establishment rapidly crumbled. A succession of further events led, in March 1990, the East Germany's first (and, as matters turned out, last) free election. reunification took place a few months later, formally in October 1990. VEB Exquisit failed to compete effectively with western retailers from, which quickly bought up most of its well positioned city centre retail outlets. Some of those who had worked for it proved themselves more adaptable to the changing times, however.

Dorothea Melis's East German reputation initially counted for little in the new Germany, but it soon became obvious that not everyone wanted to forget the "socialist" version of Germany. In 1992 the first edition of Dorothea Melis' book "Sibylle. Modefotografien 1962–1994" appeared, and very quickly became acknowledged as the standard work on Fashion Photography in the German Democratic Republic. She was able to organise exhibitions of the work of photographers who had worked with her for "Sibylle", such as Sibylle Bergemann. She gave lectures on fashion in the German Democratic Republic at the art colleges, wrote more books about the past and wryly observed the present.

Dorothea Melis was predeceased by her second husband. In June 2015 she herself died, on a Monday, in Berlin aged 77, following a long illness.

== Output (selection) ==
- Sibylle. Modefotografie aus drei Jahrzehnten DDR. Verlag Schwarzkopf & Schwarzkopf, Berlin 1998. ISBN 3-89602-164-8
- Die Berlinerin. Fotografien und Geschichten. Verlag Schwarzkopf & Schwarzkopf, Berlin 2000. ISBN 3-89602-341-1
- Sibylle. Modefotografien 1962–1994. Lehmstedt Verlag, Leipzig 2010. ISBN 978-3-937146-87-4
