= Ursula Arnold =

German photographer

- Born: March 10, 1929; Gera, Germany
- Died: May 24, 2012 (aged 83)
- Education: Hochschule für Grafik und Buchkunst, Germany
- Occupation: Photographer
- Awards: Hannah Höch Prize (2002)

Ursula Arnold (born Ursula Musche: 10 March 1929 – 24 May 2012) was a German photographer. Much of her best known work involves street scenes in Berlin and Leipzig produced during the German Democratic Republic years. Living under a one-party government which valued visual artistry as a device for influence and control over the people, she was described as "one of those artists who could not easily be integrated". She said (in 1990): "If I ask myself if there's a different reality for me [as a woman rather than as a man], then the answer is [one to a different question]: not to belong to the rulers. My sympathies belong to those who are not part of the ruling establishment". (Note: "Wenn ich mich frage, ob es für mich eine andere Wirklichkeit als für Männer gibt, heißt die Antwort: nicht zu den Herrschenden zu gehören. Meine Sympathie gehört denen, die nicht zu den Herrschenden gehören.")

== Biography ==
Ursula Musche was born in Gera, a few months before the Wall Street crash ushered in two decades of economic and political crises for (Germany), during which she grew up. Her father, Walter Musche (1898–1983), worked as a self-employed photographer. In 1948 she passed her school final exams (Abitur), by now determined to follow in her father's footsteps by becoming a professional photographer herself. She moved to nearby Weimar where she learned her craft in the studio-workshop of Harry Evers, who had studied with Walter Hege.

Arnold then studied photography at the Fine Arts Academy ("Hochschule für Grafik und Buchkunst" / HGB) in Leipzig between 1950 and 1955, and emerged with a degree. She was nevertheless disappointed by her time at the HGB. After the war the central third of Germany (including Gera, Leipzig and the eastern half of Berlin) had found itself administered as the Soviet occupation zone. The zone was relaunched in October 1949 as the Soviet sponsored German Democratic Republic (East Germany). At the academy in Leipzig the onset of the "formalism debate" during the early 1950s constrained the freedom of the teachers to discuss or depart from a curriculum which was uncompromisingly based on government strictures and official beliefs concerning "socialist imagery". Experiments were strictly off the agenda, and might have led to career damaging consequences. These issues reflected the wider situation in the country in which, in 1955, Ursula Arnold attempted to launch herself on a career as a freelance photographer.

A new student, Evelyn Richter, had enrolled at the HGB in 1953. She and Arnold formed an intense professional relationship, and as they exchanged insights on photography a personal friendship also developed between them. These two were not the only photography students who felt themselves artistically suffocated by political spoon-feeding and intolerance. With others they set up a student mutual support group which they called "action fotografie". In a country which set great store by the visual arts, many of those involved in "action fotografie" would go on to become some of East Germany's top photographers. Along with Ursula Arnold and Evelyn Richter, participants included Renate Rössing, Roger Rössing, Günter Rössler, Friedrich Bernstein and Barbara Haller. The first photographic exhibition presented by "action fotografie" appeared alongside the entrance stairway of the Capitol Cinema in Leipzig and in the adjacent entrance hall to the city's famous Trade Fair Center.

Andreas Arnold, Ursula's son, had been born in 1953. The ambition to support herself and her child through working as a free-lance photographer in Leipzig proved unachievable, and in 1956 or 1957 Ursula Arnold moved to East Berlin. In 1957 she took a job as a camera operator with the dramatic art department at the national television service. By 1968 she had reached the position of "erste Kamerafrau" (literally, "first camera lady"). That day job still left time for her to continue with her freelance photography, capturing "people in city spaces [and] the sadnesses of daily life". On a couple of occasions she managed to travel abroad: there was a photographic trip to Warsaw in 1959 and another to Moscow in 1969. In 1985 her work as a camera operator for state television came to an end and she was able to turn to landscape photography. Notable collections that she produced included one of Leuenberger Forest and another of the Märkische Schweiz natural park.

== Evaluation ==
Ursula Arnold, Evelyn Richter and Arno Fischer, continue to be seen by commentators as the three most important East German photographers of their generation.

Ursula Arnold's photography was decisively influenced by her critical evaluation of the reality of the German Democratic Republic, where photography was often used as a means of political education. Oppositional points of view that did offered an alternative image to that provided by the authorities were rejected. Ursula Arnold was an artist who could not so easily be integrated into such a system. The commentator Franziska Schmidt wrote an introduction for an exhibition dedicated to Ursula Arnold in the Berlinische Galerie that Arnold's pictures "illustrate the quiet and concealed sides of life, where the individual is jusr concerned with him/herself and the everyday worries. Her pictures bring out the discrepancy between the ideological propagandist presentation of the optimistic individual as the battling hero of socialism and real life conditions". In her own words, she was looking for "what is special and what is simple in daily life, to collect nuances which reveal life – to touch at the relationships in anonymity". (Note: "Ich möchte im Alltäglichen das Besondere und das Einfache suchen, Nuancen sammeln, die Leben ausdrücken … in der Anonymität das Verwandte treffen.")

A recurring theme during much of her career was real-life images of city life in Leipzig and Berlin. Some of her most important pictures were taken during the 1980s in the Prenzlauer Berg district of Berlin. Then for several years after reunification Arnold photographed only landscapes in the countryside surrounding the German capital.

== Awards ==
In 2002, she was awarded the Hannah Höch Prize.
