= Axel Bertram =

German artist, graphic designer, illustrator and opinion journalist (1936–2019)

- Born: 26 March 1936; Dresden, Saxony, Germany
- Died: 16 March 2019 (aged 82); Berlin, Germany
- Education: Academy for Fine and Applied Arts
- Occupations: Commercial artist Type designer illustrator Magazine (and book and newspaper) designer Medallist; Commentator-journalist
- Political party: SED
- Spouses: 1. Dorothea Melis (born Dorothea Voigt); 2. Ruth
- Children: Matthias Bertram

Axel Bertram (26 March 1936 - 16 March 2019) was a German commercial artist, type designer, illustrator, magazine designer and medalist. During his later decades he became, in addition, a knowledgeable and dedicated expert on calligraphy. Confident in his judgements, he also contributed articles to newspapers and magazines, though this was motivated more by a personal drive to share his enthusiasm for his ideas on design than because he aspired to any sort of career as a journalist or commentator.

To paraphrase several of the tributes paid to his memory after he died (which seem to have originated with a press release issued by the Leipzig publishing business, Lehmstedt Verlag), only the specialists knew his name, but virtually every East German citizen was familiar with Bertram's work and, after the East German coinage redesign that started in 1969, carried examples of it in a purse or a pocket when leaving home.

== Life ==
Axel Bertram was born on Dresden and grew up in Freital, a small industrial town a short distance to the south of the city. His father was a graphic artist and businessman. After successfully completing his schooling he undertook a one-year apprenticeship in technical drawing during 1954/55. That was followed by a move to the capital and a five-year study period at the Academy for Fine and Applied Arts (as it was known at that time) in Berlin-Weißensee. Here his principal tutors were the poster artist Klaus Wittkugel and the graphic artist Werner Klemke. He was also taught by Arno Mohr and Ernst Vogenauer. He received his degree in Graphic Arts in 1960, and for the next twelve years worked in Berlin as a freelancer. He also teamed up with three fellow students to form the "Ateliergemeinschaft Gruppe 4", of which he was always by far the best known member. The co-operatively structured graphic design workshop quickly rose to fame - or in the eyes of certain artistic conservatives notoriety - with projects such as the "graphic redesign" for Berlin's Metropol Theatre. He remained with the "Ateliergemeinschaft2 till 1972.

In 1972 he returned to the Weißensee Academy for Fine and Applied Arts as a "chief assistant" and in 1973 accepted a position as a lecturer. He became a party member in 1977. That same year he was promoted to a full professorship in fonts and graphic design at the academy, also serving, between 1977 and 1982, as Head of Department in Commercial Art. 1977 was also the year in which Bertram was awarded the Art Prize of the German Democratic Republic. He now emerged rapidly as a leading member of the East German cultural establishment, and while he was never a committed proseletyser for "Soviet imperial socialism", commentators (including his own son) believe that Bertram and his professional colleagues dared to dream that the obvious "ailments" of socialism as it operated in East Germany might yet prove "curable". During and after the changes that led in 1990 to German reunification, Bertram returned to his salaried work at the Weißensee Academy, between 1989 and 1992 again serving as Ordinary (i.e. full) Professor in fonts and graphic design.

Between 1961 and 1990 Bertram was, like all successful freelance workers in the sector, a member of the Berlin-based VBK (East German Visual Artists' Association). He was an active participant in the running of the organisation, joining the VBK National Executive in 1970, and serving as vice-president of it during 1988/89. In addition he served, between 1982 and 1990 as head of the Artistic Advisory Board at the East German State Bank (Central Bank of the GDR).

== Works ==
Bertram designed numerous books, newspapers and magazines. One of the better remembered examples was "Sibylle*, East Germany's widely circulated magazine for "fashion and the arts", which Bertram tended to reference in interviews, possibly because the exercise was effectively a long-running joint project with the magazine's fashion editor, Dorothea Melis, to whom he was married between 1957 and 1962. Other magazines he designed or redesigned included the mass-circulation weekly news magazine, "Neue Berliner Illustrierte", the relatively short-lived news magazine "Profil" and "Wochenpost", the country's most successful and, many believe, most influential weekly publication. It was for "Wochenpost" that his radical (famously "computer aided") redesign incorporated, as early as 1970, a layout featuring a small margin column down on side of pages displaying articles.

In 1969 East German citizens found a new design for the 20 Pfennig coin in their change, designed by Bertram to replace the widely disparaged 20 Pfennig light-weight "Alu-Chip" (coin). (Note: "Alu-Chip" was East German slang for the light-weight coins used in East Germany (and elsewhere in central Europe) during the 1950s and 1960s, having been designed in the late 1940s, when there was still a world-wide glut of aluminium, following a collapse in demand for fighter planes. An "Alu-Chip" was not a pioneering prototype computer chip.) Minted only in very small quantities, and issued at around the same time, was the "general circulation 5 Mark" coin designed by Bertram. He also teamed up with the pioneering industrial designer Rudi Högner to redesign the East German 1 Mark and 2 Mark coins which were issued respectively in 1973 and 1974, and both remained in circulation till 1990. He also designed numerous commemorative medallions for the government during this period, celebrating anniversaries in respect of historical celebrities including Johannes Gutenberg (1968), Johannes Kepler (1971), Johannes Brahms (1972) and, much later, the polymath-architect Karl Friedrich Schinkel (2006).

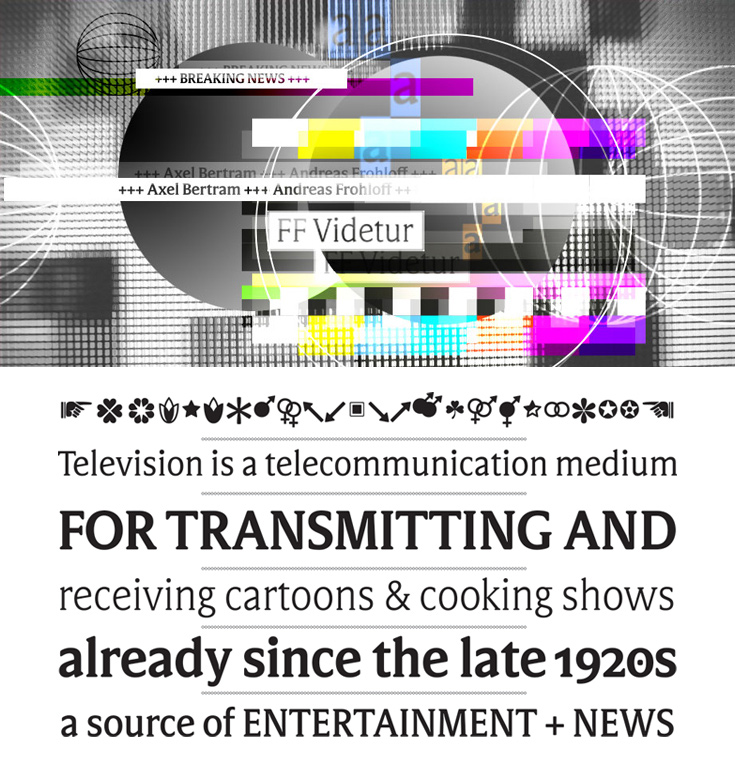
Bertram's "Videtur" font, launched in 1986, was designed for use on television screens.

According to at least one source, there was no field of design that exercised a greater fascination for Axel Bertram than typeface design. Prompted in part by the very restricted range of typefaces commonly applied by publishing houses in East Germany, he designed bespoke typefaces for "Sibylle* and "Neue Berliner Illustrierte", and also designed typefaces for typewriter machines. During the 1980s he designed "Videtur", a font specially designed for television screens, commissioned for use by East German television. He also designed the "Rabenau" font.

A number of sources pay tribute to Bertram's habit of worrying away at improving his designs: "Rabenau" represented the culmination of approximately thirty years spent intermittently working away at perfecting his typeface designs. The appearance of mainstream desktop publishing during the 1990s afforded opportunities for further elaboration and enhancement.

Between 1979 and 1982 Bertram designed thirty stamps for Deutsche Post of the GDR the post office of the German Democratic Republic depicting poultry, dolls and, both historic and mechanical toys.

Alongside his artistic work, Bertram wrote various essays and articles on the history and theory of commercial art. Other topics on which he wrote included the role of design in daily life. There were also numerous biographical summaries concerning individual designers. In 2004, reflecting his decades-long preoccupation with the history of writing, he published a more substantial work under a title that consciously celebrates Bach "Das wohltemperierte Alphabet" ("The Well-Tempered Alphabet"), a cultural history of printing and typefaces during the Gutenberg era.

With his wide-ranging commercial artistry and his articulate advocacy of good day-to-day design solutions, Axel Bertram was among the most influential designers of the post-war period. Much of his personal and professional legacy is preserved in Leipzig at the "Deutsches Buch- und Schriftmuseum" (".... Museum of Books and Writing").

== Personal ==
Axel Bertram was married to the fashion writer Dorothea Melis (as she subsequently became known, following her second marriage) between approximately 1957 and 1962. His second marriage, in 1963, was to the photographer identified in sources simply by her married name as Ruth Bertram. The historian Matthias Bertram was the child of his first marriage.
