= Roger Melis =

German photographer

- Born: 30 October 1940; Berlin, Germany
- Died: 11 September 2009 (aged 68); Berlin, Germany
- Occupation: Photographer
- Spouse: Dorothea Bertram
- Parent: Fritz Melis

Roger Melis (20 October 1940 – 11 September 2009) was a German photographer specialising in portraiture, photo-journalism and fashion photography.

== Life ==
=== Early years ===
Roger Melis was born during the early part of the war. His father was the sculptor Fritz Melis. Melis grew up in the household of his stepfather, the poet Peter Huchel, initially in western Berlin and from 1952 in Wilhelmshorst near Potsdam which had ended the war in the Soviet occupation zone of what remained of Germany, and was by now part of the newly created German Democratic Republic (GDR or East Germany). Between 1957 and 1960 he undertook an apprenticeship in photography, which was followed by six months working at sea. In 1962 he took a post as a technical photographer at the Charité (university hospital) in Berlin.

=== Photography ===
"Melis [in his photography] combines the documenting power of August Sander with the awareness of class distinctions of earlier German photo-portraitists and the graceful artistry of Henri Cartier-Bresson, to penetrate every-day experiences."

"Melis verbindet die registrierende Strenge eines August Sander, des frühen Porträtisten der deutschen sozialen Stände, mit der graziösen, artistischen Aufmerksamkeit eines Henri Cartier-Bresson für die Sensationen des Alltags."

Peter von Becker in Tagesspiegel

"The output of Roger Melis – the black-and-white photographs – which recall, through their clarity and arrangement, the carefully structured compositions employed in the paintings of the old-masters, show a completely different world and quite different people from those presented in [the German Democratic Republic's] published press images. Melis understood how to wait until the elements seen through his lens came together so that their individual subjects, the human beings, showed up in the viewfinder as they really were."

"Die Arbeiten von Roger Melis, schwarz-weiße Fotografien, die in ihrer Klarheit und ihrem Bildaufbau an die durchdachte, sorgfältige Komposition alter Gemälde erinnern, zeigen eine andere Welt und andere Menschen als die in der staatlich gelenkten Presse veröffentlichten Fotos. Melis verstand zu warten, bis der Blick ins Offene ging, der Mensch sichtbar wurde, er bei sich war und sich zeigte."

Christoph Hein in the Frankfurter Allgemeine Zeitung

1962 was also the year in which he started to build a portfolio of portrait photographs of various poets and artists: this was part of a book project concerning the division of Germany, but the project would remain unrealised. In 1966 he produced his first work for the magazine "Merian", and his first fashion photography appeared in the popular fashion and arts women's magazine "Sibylle" in 1968. That was the year in which he set up house with the fashion journalist Dorothea Bertram, and the two of them were married two years later. 1968 was also the year in which he became a member of the state sanctioned League of Visual Artists (VBK / Verband Bildender Künstler), after which he was able to work as a freelance photographer. A year later, together with various other high-profile photographers including Arno Fischer and Sibylle Bergemann, he established the Photographers' Group known as "Direkt". He was a co-founder and, from 1981, the chairman of the Central Photography Working Group at the VBK. He also held a teaching position, from 1978 till 1990, at Berlin's Weißensee Arts Academy.

Melis made his reputation as a fashion photographer, notably for Sibylle, a fashion magazine, and for more general photo-reportage that appeared in publications including the "Neue Berliner Illustrierte", "Wochenpost", "Die Zeit", "Frankfurter Allgemeine Zeitung", "Süddeutsche Zeitung" and "Geo". Above all he was known, in east and west alike, for powerful portraits of leading literary and artistic figures including Anna Seghers, Christa Wolf, Thomas Brasch, Wolf Biermann, Franz Fühmann, Heiner Müller or Sarah Kirsch.

=== Banned ===
In 1981 Melis found himself banned from further work with the East German press. He had recently undertaken a joint project for GEO with the novelist Erich Loest. Loest had been campaigning against censorship and by the end of the 1970s was subject to a sustained programme of persecution by the authorities. In 1981 Loest managed to escape to the west and some sources indicate that it was working with Loest shortly before this that led to the ban on Melis. Other commentators, noting the stark realism with which some of his photo-journalism documented the less glamorous aspects of daily life, think that the ban on his press work came about from nothing more obscure than the failure of Melis to sugar-coat his photographic reportage in order more closely to align with the state's official image of itself. His publisher, Mark Lehmstedt described the photographs as "a testament to the scepticism and resignation of the people of East Germany... [but they also celebrate] ... their pride, their endurance and their desires". The press ban on Melis lasted until the German Democratic Republic fell in 1989. He now concentrated on exhibition work and books. His volume "Paris on Foot" (published by "Volk und Welt", Berlin 1986) sold 40,000 copies, making it one of the country's most commercially successful volumes of photographs.

=== Turning point ===
After the reunification of Germany he was able to return to photo-journalism and portraiture, contributing in particular to "Wochenpost", "Die Zeit" and the "Süddeutsche Zeitung", gaining a wider audience now across the whole of Germany both for his new works and for his photographic output from the communist years.

== Publications ==
In 2007 the Lehmstedt publishing house in Leipzig issued the first in a four volume set of books documenting East Germany through the lens of Melis. With the first volume, entitled "In a quiet country" ("In einem stillen Land"), Melis was one of the first to present a wide-ranging portrait of the German Democratic Republic and the people who inhabited it. Positive critical reaction was widespread: in a review headed "Behind the time-wall", Die Zeit acknowledged Melis as "the Master of East German photorealism". The second volume appeared in 2008 and was devoted to some of his large accumulation of "Künstlerporträts", portraits he had taken over 40 years of artists including, notably, literary figures from the GDR period. "At the Edges of Time" ("Am Rande der Zeit") followed in 2010, a photographic compendium on village life in the German Democratic Republic.

=== List of publications ===
- Roger Melis: Paris zu Fuß. Mit einem Vorwort von Stephan Hermlin. Volk und Welt, Berlin 1986
- Roger Melis: Berlin – Berlin. Schriftstellerporträts aus 30 Jahren. Herausgegeben von Michael Davidis. Mit einem Vorwort von Klaus Völker. Deutsches Literaturarchiv, Marbach am Neckar 1992
- Roger Melis: Wolf Biermann – Ausgebürgert. Schwarzkopf & Schwarzkopf, Berlin 1997
- Roger Melis: London zu Fuß. Schwarzkopf & Schwarzkopf, Berlin 1999 ISBN 3-89602-313-6
- Roger Melis: In einem stillen Land. Fotografien 1964–1989. Lehmstedt, Leipzig 2007, 3. Auflage 2009, ISBN 978-3-937146-52-2.
- Roger Melis: Künstlerporträts. Fotografien 1962–2002. Lehmstedt, Leipzig 2008, ISBN 978-3-937146-54-6.
- Roger Melis: Am Rande der Zeit. Fotografien 1973–1989. Herausgegeben von Mathias Bertram. Lehmstedt, Leipzig 2010, ISBN 978-3-937146-70-6.

== Last things ==
Melis died after a long illness in 2009. The rural retreat that Roger and Dorothea had acquired nearly four decades earlier was sold in 2013. Back in the 1970s a major benefit for East German city dwellers who could afford a country home was the chance to grow fresh vegetables, but by 2013 abundant fresh food was available in the shops and by the time the property was sold the much prized vegetable supply had given way to a small flower garden.
