= Hilde Eisler =

Hilda Eisler
- Born: Brunhilde Rothstein; 28 January 1912; Ternopil, Galicia, Austro-Hungary
- Died: 8 October 2000 (aged 88); Berlin, Germany
- Occupations: Political activist Journalist; Managing editor (Das Magazin)
- Political party: KPD; SED
- Spouse: Gerhart Eisler (1897–1968)
- Parent: Salo Vogel-Rothstein (?-1942)

Hilde Eisler (born Brunhilde Rothstein: 28 January 1912 – 8 October 2000) was a political activist and journalist. In 1956 she took over as editor in chief of Das Magazin, a lifestyle and fashion magazine in the German Democratic Republic (East Germany), noteworthy according to Eisler herself when interviewed in 1988 as the first and for some years the only magazine in East Germany to feature nude pictures.

Eisler is sometimes described as a German journalist of Jewish provenance. She was born in what was, at the time, the Austro-Hungarian empire. Because of the frontier changes mandated in 1919, as a young woman she carried not a German or Austrian passport, but a Polish one. She did come from a Jewish family, though on account of her non-stereotypical blonde hair and blue eyes this was not immediately obvious to Gestapo officers and other government officials with whom, usually on account of her record of Communist involvement, she came into contact after the Nazi power seizure of 1933. She spent most of 1935 in prison and escaped into exile from Germany in 1936.

During the late 1940s, when she was living in the United States, her communist background (along with her acquisition by this time of a communist husband) attracted unwelcome intervention in her life from those who took their political lead from Senator McCarthy. At the end of June 1949 she was expelled from New York and returned to Berlin.

== Life ==
=== Family provenance and childhood ===
Brunhilde Rothstein was born in Ternopil, a major city and administrative centre in the eastern part of Galicia which at that time was part of the Austro-Hungarian empire. Her father, Salomon Vogel-Rothstein was a Jewish merchant, and it was in connection with his work that when she was six months old the family relocated to Antwerp in Belgium. Two years after that war broke out and her father was conscripted into the Austrian army (but would survive the experience). Her mother, Amalie "Malie" Gross, now found herself identified as an enemy alien and in 1914 the two of them moved again, this time to Frankfurt am Main in Germany, where her mother's parents, Feivel and Gissela Gross, had been based for many years. It was in Frankfurt that Brunhilde Rothstein grew up, in moderately comfortable circumstances. She attended the city's Jewish lyceum (secondary school) and was a member of the Jewish Pathfinder Association. She would later describe her childhood in Frankfurt as "beautiful and protected" (" ... eine schöne und behütete Kindheit").

=== Work and politics ===
From 1929 to 1930 she undertook a training in the book trade, after which, still aged only eighteen, she moved to Berlin where, from 1930 to 1934, she was employed by the Marx-Engels publishing house. The period was one of growing political awareness: in 1931 Brunhilde Rothstein joined the Communist Party. In January 1933 the Nazi party took power and lost no time in transforming Germany into a one-party dictatorship.

The Reichstag fire at the end of February 1933 was immediately blamed on "communists", and it was individuals and institutions connected with the (now illegal) Communist Party that found themselves at the top of the government target list. The Marx-Engels publishing house, where Rothstein worked, was owned by the Moscow-based Marxism–Leninism Institute and the Nazis closed it down. Acting on instructions from the institute back in Moscow she now went each day to the main public library in central Berlin where she borrowed and then copied out any articles she could find on or by Karl Marx, then delivering the copies to the Soviet embassy. This activity ceased after the library director banned her because, as he put it, he did not want a nice German girl corrupted by Marxist literature. It was as she recalled the incident many years later that she wryly added that, with her blonde hair and blue eyes, it would never have occurred to anyone that she might be Jewish.

=== Nazi Germany ===
The party central committee then ordered her to Basel to work with an operation that involved producing "disguised anti-fascist literature". She was to work as a courier, traveling back into Germany with the leaflets in her luggage. She managed twelve such missions, but early in 1935 she was caught on the thirteenth trip. There followed a year in prison and a trial for "treason". Although most sources indicate that the imprisonment came after the trial, Eisner's own recollection, published in an interview in 1988, indicates that once the case came to trial the decision was taken to deport her to Poland, since she had a Polish passport. It would certainly have been quite usual, at this time, for someone caught smuggling communist literature into Germany to spend a year in pre-trial "investigative detention" before facing trial and sentencing. In any event, early in 1936 she was taken to Poland, one of a group transported in sealed railway trucks ("in plombierten Bahnwagen") as far as Frankfurt an der Oder (not, at that time, a frontier city) where they were trans-shipped into open lorries (trucks), while Frankfurters threw stones at them. The trucks nevertheless delivered them to Poland from where, helped by relatives, Brunhilde Rothstein made her way via Prague to Paris where she arrived before or during 1937.

=== French exile ===
Paris was by now established informally as the western headquarters of the German Communist Party in exile. In 1937 she started working for "Deutsche Freiheitssender 29.8", a radio operation which provided broadcasting facilities for and on behalf of the Republican side in the Spanish Civil War. The radio station transmitted initially from Madrid, but celebrity supporters (and others) unable or unwilling to make their way across war torn Spain, including Bertolt Brecht, Albert Einstein, Ernest Hemingway and Thomas Mann, were also able to speak on the station from an improvised studio in Paris. The radio station therefore retained a small editorial team in Paris of which Rothstein was a member. Another member was the communist political activist Gerhart Eisler whom, a few years later, she would marry.

=== Escape from Europe ===
Following the outbreak of the Second World War in September 1939 and the German invasion of France in May/June 1940 most of the German political exiles in France were suddenly identified as enemy aliens and arrested. As the holder of a Polish passport, Brunhilde Rothstein was not arrested. She supported herself with a series of casual jobs, at one stage wrapping sweets (candies) for a living. By this time it appears that Brunhilde Rothstein and Gerhart Eisler had become "more than just friends". Gerhart Eisler was interned by the French in 1939, but in 1941 he became a beneficiary of an offer of political asylum for Spanish Civil War veterans by the Mexican government. He was now permitted to emigrate from France to Mexico, with Rothstein who was registered on relevant documentation as his fiancée. Their destination changed when the ship on which they were travelling was torpedoed, with the result that they ended up not in Mexico but in Trinidad where the British promptly interned them. After some weeks they were permitted to resume their journey, now required to board a ship to New York City. Despite being in possession of a transit permit, they were then interned for three months on Ellis Island, since 1892 New York's (and the United States') principal immigration station. A fellow internee was Anna Seghers. The country was still formally not participating in the war, but the government had nevertheless recently issued a blanket ban on German or Austrian nationals seeking to travel to Latin America via the USA. Several months later, following a successful lobbying campaign by stateside friends, Eisler and Rothstein were permitted to enter the United States on a short-term permit. Over the next few years their short-term permits were repeatedly renewed. On 24 August 1942 Rothstein married Eisler (as his third wife) and they made their home in the Queens district of New York.

=== Expulsion from America ===
Gerhart Eisler worked as a journalist in New York. Available sources are silent on Hilde Eisler's activities there. War ended in May 1945 and Gerhart Eisler was keen to return to Europe. Hilde would have preferred to stay in New York. Towards the end of 1945 she found out that her parents and sister had been murdered in the Nazi concentration camps. Many relatives had met the same fate. But if she had let her husband return home without her she would, as she later told an interviewer, have "found no sympathy with ... American friends" if she "would have, so to speak, deserted [their marriage]". A major complication came in February 1947 when her husband was arrested. Following the formal end of the war, in May 1945, they had been under growing police surveillance in the context of the Cold War tensions of the time. Gerhart Eisler was denounced as a Soviet agent by a party comrade (possibly his sister, from whom he had been estranged since 1933) and accused by the authorities of having lied about his Communist Party links on his immigration application. The case against Gerhart Eisler became increasingly politicised. Press reports surfaced indicating that Eisler was the "boss of every red, directly controlled by the Kremlin". Hilde traveled across the country, from New York to Hollywood, gathering support and money to fund her husband's defense. However, in May 1949, temporarily at liberty pending his final appeal, Gerhart Eisler managed to escape by pretending to be blind and smuggling himself on board a Polish liner, which then dropped him off unceremoniously in London from where, after several further unpleasantnesses, he was freed and permitted to move on to Germany.

Following discovery of her husband's disappearance, Hilde Eisler was immediately arrested. She was invited to inform on her husband, in return for which her US interrogators offered to give her a permanent visa. Disclosing how he had escaped as a stowaway on a Polish ship (at a time before news of his discovery on board by the liner's crew had been received) would have amounted to a betrayal, however. Given that continuing renewal of her temporary immigration permits was no longer an option, there was no question of her being able to remain in the United States. Having found no evidence-based reason to detain her further, after six weeks imprisonment the authorities released Hilde Eisler and she was expelled via Ellis Island at the end of June 1949.

=== Back in Berlin ===
Berlin, to which the Eislers returned, was now surrounded by a large section of Germany which was being administered as the Soviet occupation zone. They had no home to go to and lived, initially, with Wilhelm Pieck (the future president of East Germany) and his daughter. Hilde Eisler found a city transformed, and not just by bombs and Soviet artillery. In the city which had been her home thirteen years earlier there was no one left who knew her. Antisemitism and racism were forbidden, but this was nevertheless the heart of the Nazi state which had murdered her family. While Gerhart quickly resumed his contacts and embarked on a largely political career, Hilde started to create a future for herself, while her husband took on the leadership of the Office for Information. On arriving in Berlin she and Gerhart had lost no time in joining the Socialist Unity Party ("Sozialistische Einheitspartei Deutschlands" / SED). 1949 was the year in which the Soviet occupation zone was relaunched as the Soviet sponsored German Democratic Republic, and the SED, established under contentious circumstances just three years earlier, was aggressively consolidating its role as the ruling party in a new kind of single-party German dictatorship. Hilde Eisler became a member of the "Defence Committee for Victims of American Reactionism". At some stage she embarked on a career in journalism.

In 1952/53 she worked as deputy chief editor of the newspaper "Friedenspost", where she worked with Rudi Wetzel. During 1953 she worked as a translator. It was also in 1953, in December, that with Wetzel and others she was a co-founder of Wochenpost, a weekly magazine covering politics, economics and culture which would quickly become East Germany's leading weekly magazine in terms of circulation. In 1954 she was appointed deputy chief editor of Das Magazin, newly founded at the start of that year Das Magazin was also party approved and mainstream, but its focus was on culture and lifestyle. Unlike most East German publications, it has survived the demise of East Germany as a separate state, and its website currently (2016) asserts that some people referred to it as "The New Yorker of the east". Eisler took over from Heinz Schmidt as editor in chief starting with the June 1956 issue. Regardless of any comparisons with The New Yorker, she demonstrated political and journalistic skill in steering the publication for two decades or more, providing what the magazine itself describes as "an unusual mixture of journalism and literature". It was the only mass circulation magazine in East Germany that regularly featured photographs and reports from beyond the Iron Curtain. Eisler's time in New York and her talent for networking meant that she had contacts with foreign writers that other editors lacked, and Das Magazin published contributions on fashion from Vienna, London and Florence. According to Eisler, it was nevertheless the nude pictures which attracted the most reader reaction: one correspondent asked why there were no pictures of naked men and another reader complained that in a previous edition the only naked picture had been one showing the subject from behind. Even if the subject matter was non political, it is noteworthy that the publication acknowledged and published some critical letters along with the adulatory ones.

Hilde Eisler retired in 1976 or 1979 (sources differ) but retained her links with Das Magazin till her death in 2000.

== Awards and honours ==
- 1965 Patriotic Order of Merit in bronze or silver
- 1977 Patriotic Order of Merit in gold
- 1982 Order of Karl Marx
- 1987 Patriotic Order of Merit gold clasp
