= Vogenauer =

Vogenauer is a surname. Notable people with the surname include:

- Ernst Rudolf Vogenauer (1897–1972), German graphic artist
- Stefan Vogenauer (born 1968), German legal scholar
