= Pfannstiel =

Pfannstiel is a surname. Notable people with the surname include:

- Erna Wallisch née Pfannstiel (1922–2008), German female Nazi camp guard
- Margot Pfannstiel (1926–1993), German journalist and author
