= Evelyn Richter =

German photographer (1930–2021)

- Born: 31 January 1930; Bautzen, Germany
- Died: 10 October 2021 (aged 91); Dresden, Saxony, Germany
- Education: Hochschule für Grafik und Buchkunst Leipzig
- Occupations: Art photographer; Academic teacher
- Organizations: Hochschule für Grafik und Buchkunst Leipzig; Fachhochschule in Bielefeld
- Awards: Culture Award (German Society for Photography); Art Prize of Dresden; Bernd und Hilla Becher-Preis

Evelyn Richter (31 January 1930 – 10 October 2021) was a German art photographer known primarily for social documentary photography work in East Germany. She is notable for her black & white photography in which she documented working-class life, and which often showed influences of Dadaism and futurism. Her photography is focused on people in everyday life, including children, workers (especially women), artists and musicians.

She taught photography both at the Hochschule für Grafik und Buchkunst Leipzig, where she had studied, from 1981, as in the 1990s, at the Fachhochschule in Bielefeld. Her work became known internationally only after German reunification.

She received awards such as the Culture Award from the German Society for Photography, the Art Prize of Dresden, and the Bernd und Hilla Becher-Preis for her life's work.

== Life and work ==
Richter was born in Bautzen in 1930.

After completing a photographic apprenticeship in Dresden with Franz Fiedler and Pan Walther from 1948 to 1951, Richter worked as a laboratory assistant at the Vereinigte Kaufstätten Dresden and as a photographer at the TU Dresden. In 1953, she enrolled at the Hochschule für Grafik und Buchkunst Leipzig (HGB) to study Fotografik (graphic photography) with Johannes Widmann, professor of the Institute of Photography. She also studied book design, working with Walter Schiller and Horst Schuster. In 1955, she was removed as a student for her "independent interests and pictorial ideas which are foreign to the demands of a realistic socialist art."

Richter worked as a freelance photographer, working for such clients as the Leipzig Trade Fair and Sibylle magazine, while simultaneously building a body of work documenting life, work, and societal change in East Germany. Her photographs frequently explored the relationship between industrial machinery and the human (often female) operators. Her focus was portraits of people in everyday situations, such as children, artists, poets and musicians, and she waited patiently for the right moment. She followed the violinist David Oistrach, travelling to concerts and rehearsals, and made a photo book about him.

Richter taught photography at the HGB from 1981, as an honorary professor from 1991 to 2002. In the 1990s, she also taught at the Fachhochschule in Bielefeld.

The Evelyn Richter Archive, with over 730 of her photographs, has been housed at the Museum der bildenden Künste (Museum of Fine Arts) in Leipzig since 2009. An exhibition of her works was held in 2010 on the occasion of her 80th birthday at the Leonhardimuseum Dresden. In 2016, her photographies were exhibited in a group show, Gehaltene Zeit, together with works by Ursula Arnold and Arno Fischer, at the Museum der bildenden Künste, Leipzig. In 2020, she was the first recipient of the Bernd und Hilla Becher-Preis of Düsseldorf for her life's work. The jury noted:

In her work, she [Evelyn Richter] explores the field of documentary in a new way: Inspired by the new international social photography, Richter focuses on people and their living environments unembellished and with empathy. As a visual chronicler, she focuses on East German working and everyday worlds, moves through public space with her camera and repeatedly captures intimate moments. The photographer, who has constantly expanded her photographic radius, especially after 1990, never succumbs to the temptation to reduce the world to unambiguity. Rather, she provides access to its complexity and enables viewers to get close to things. In her openness and unapproachability lies the great topicality of Evelyn Richter's photographic attitude. (Note: In ihrem Werk lotet sie [Evelyn Richter] das Feld des Dokumentarischen neu aus: Inspiriert von der neuen internationalen Sozialfotografie fokussiert Richter den Menschen und seine Lebenswelten so ungeschönt wie empathisch. Als visuelle Chronistin richtet sie den Blick auf ostdeutsche Arbeits- und Alltagswelten, bewegt sich mit ihrer Kamera durch den öffentlichen Raum und trotzt diesem immer wieder bestechend intime Momente ab. Dabei erliegt die Fotografin, die insbesondere nach 1990 auf vielen Reisen stetig ihren fotografischen Radius erweitert, nie der Versuchung, die Welt auf Eindeutigkeiten herunterzubrechen. Vielmehr legt sie Zugänge zu deren Komplexität und ermöglicht es Betrachterinnen und Betrachtern, den Dingen nahe zu kommen. In ihrer Offenheit und Unvereinnahmbarkeit liegt die große Aktualität von Evelyn Richters fotografischer Haltung.)

Richter died in Dresden at age 91 in a nursing home where she had lived for eight years after a stroke.

== Publications ==
=== Publications by Richter ===
- Arrested Time = Stillgehaltene Zeit. Heidelberg: Braus, 2002. Edited by Astrid Ihle. ISBN 978-3-89904-051-7. With a text by Matthias Flg̈ge. In German and English. Catalogue published "on the occasion of the Evelyn Richter exhibition in the Goethe Institute in Washington DC, from November 6, 2002 until January 10, 2003, and in the Leica Gallery in New York City from January 30, 2003 to March 1, 2003".

=== Publications with contributions by Richter ===
- Wer War Wer in der DDR? Berlin: Links, 2010. By Helmut Müller-Enbergs. ISBN 978-3-86153-561-4.

== Awards ==
- 1975: Ehrenpreis für Fotografie des Kulturbundes der DDR
- 1978: Ehrenpreis of then photokina in Cologne
- 1992: Kulturpreis der Deutschen Gesellschaft für Photographie of the German Photographic Society
- 1997: Villa Massimo
- 1992: Culture Award, German Society for Photography, Cologne
- 2006: Kunstpreis der Landeshauptstadt Dresden (Art prize of the state capital of Dresden)
- 2020: Bernd und Hilla Becher-Preis

== Exhibitions ==
=== Solo exhibitions ===
- 2002/2003: Goethe-Institut, Washington, D.C., November 2002 – January 2003

=== Group exhibitions ===
- 2010: Eros und Stasi. Ostdeutsche Fotografie Sammlung Gabriele Koenig, Ludwig Forum für Internationale Kunst, Aachen.
- 2012/2013: The Shuttered Society: Art Photography in the GDR 1949-1989, Berlinische Galerie, Berlin.
- 2016: Gehaltene Zeit. Ursula Arnold, Arno Fischer, Evelyn Richter, Museum der bildenden Künste, Leipzig.
- 2016: Die Lehre. Arno Fischer, Evelyn Richter, Art gallery of Sparkasse Leipzig. Common catalog.
