= Jutta Resch-Treuwerth =

German journalist (1941–2015)

- Born: Jutta Treuwerth; 30 April 1941; Berlin-Tiergarten, Germany
- Died: 18 February 2015 (aged 73); Lauchhammer, Brandenburg, Germany
- Education: Leipzig Journalism Academy
- Occupations: journalist newspaper agony-aunt relationship counsellor
- Spouse(s): 1. _____ Müller; 2. Dieter Resch
- Children: (daughter) Müller; Daniel Resch

Jutta Resch-Treuwerth (30 April 1941 - 18 February 2015) was a German journalist. She became well known in the German Democratic Republic (East Germany) as a marriage and relationship counsellor.

== Life ==
Jutta Treuwerth was born in the Tiergarten quarter of north-central Berlin during the first part of the war. She was bought up by her grandparents in Berlin-Lichtenberg. As was normal in East Germany at this time, on leaving school she was required to spend a year in industry - in her case employed in the brown coal industry in Lusatia - before progressing to a year's internship at Junge Welt, the daily newspaper that had become the official publication of the FDJ - which was in effect the youth wing of East Germany's ruling Socialist Unity Party ("Sozialistische Einheitspartei Deutschlands" / SED). After that she studied journalism at the prestigious Journalism Academy in Leipzig. On completing her studies she returned to Junge Welt in Berlin, appointed a full-time member of the editorial team in 1965. Two years later her head of department, Brigitte Zimmermann, commended the way her young colleague could prepare "publication-ready text" completely on her own, demonstrating an outstanding ability to think through readers' problems through the eyes of the readers themselves.

In 1971 she took over the newspaper's "Unter vier Augen" (literally: Under four eyes) column, becoming in effect what the English term a "newspaper agony aunt", answering reader questions about sex and associated relationship issues. It is believed that between 1971 and 1992 she dealt with approximately 22,000 readers' questions. Hormonally based contraception pills had recently become available at no cost through health insurance, while in East Germany (in contrast to West Germany) it had also become possible to have legal abortions up to the third month of pregnancy. In the east as in the west, questions which for previous generations would frequently have been answered with a simple "no" from the grown ups, now frequently triggered more nuanced answers, and there is a real sense that for a new generation of teenagers and young adults Jutta Resch-Treuwerth was as influential as anyone in setting behavioural parameters. She lived long enough to see her own entry in an early (German) version of Wikipedia in which, she reported, it had been stated that she was "very close" to the East German Ministry of Education. She strenuously denied this, insisting that her "contributions" often "went too far" for the ministry, and that ministry officials, where they expressed opinions, would have preferred that sex education be left to schools and teachers. Nevertheless, the fact that she ran the column for twenty years, during which time Junge Welt continued to enjoy the support of the authorities, indicates that her advice column was not completely unacceptable to the old men in the politburo. The target readership initially was the cohort aged between roughly 14 and 25, but during her time running the "Unter vier Augen" column the average age of readers submitting questions increased, so that by 1992 plenty of the letters came from people well over 30.

From the mid-1980s Jutta Resch-Treuwerth was also running her own advisory service covering marriage and family matters at her base in Hohen Neuendorf near Berlin. After her work with Junge Welt ended (at least for a time), this would become her principal professional focus.

After the changes which turned out to be a prelude to reunification in 1990, Resch-Treuwerth left Junge Welt in 1992 and launched herself as a freelance counsellor, working for various media outlets. In 1996 she set up a dating agency in Hohen Neuendorf. She worked as a moderator on a family advice show entitled - predictably - "Unter vier Augen" produced by the regional broadcaster "Ruppin Prignitz TV" and she wrote as a guest columnist for various regional newspapers. Finally, in March 2013, she returned to Junge Welt as a regular columnist, her contributions appearing under the headline "Unter vier Augen".

During the final part of her life Jutta Resch-Treuwerth suffered from cancer. She died in a Lauchhammer hospital in February 2015.

== Publication (selection) ==
- 1982: Leben zu Zweit, Verlag Neues Leben.
- 1986: Verliebt, verlobt, verheiratet , Verlag Neues Leben.
- 1986: Ich hab dich lieb – Briefgeschichten, Verlag Junge Welt, ISBN 3-7302-0018-6.
- 1987: Vierzehn geworden, Verlag Neues Leben, ISBN 3-355-00487-1.
- 2001: Unter vier Augen, Schwarzkopf & Schwarzkopf
- 2011: Warum denn nicht, Verlag Neues Leben, ISBN 978-3-355-01786-2.

== Awards and honours ==
- 1981 Patriotic Order of Merit in bronze
