= Harald Hauswald =

German photographer (born 1954)

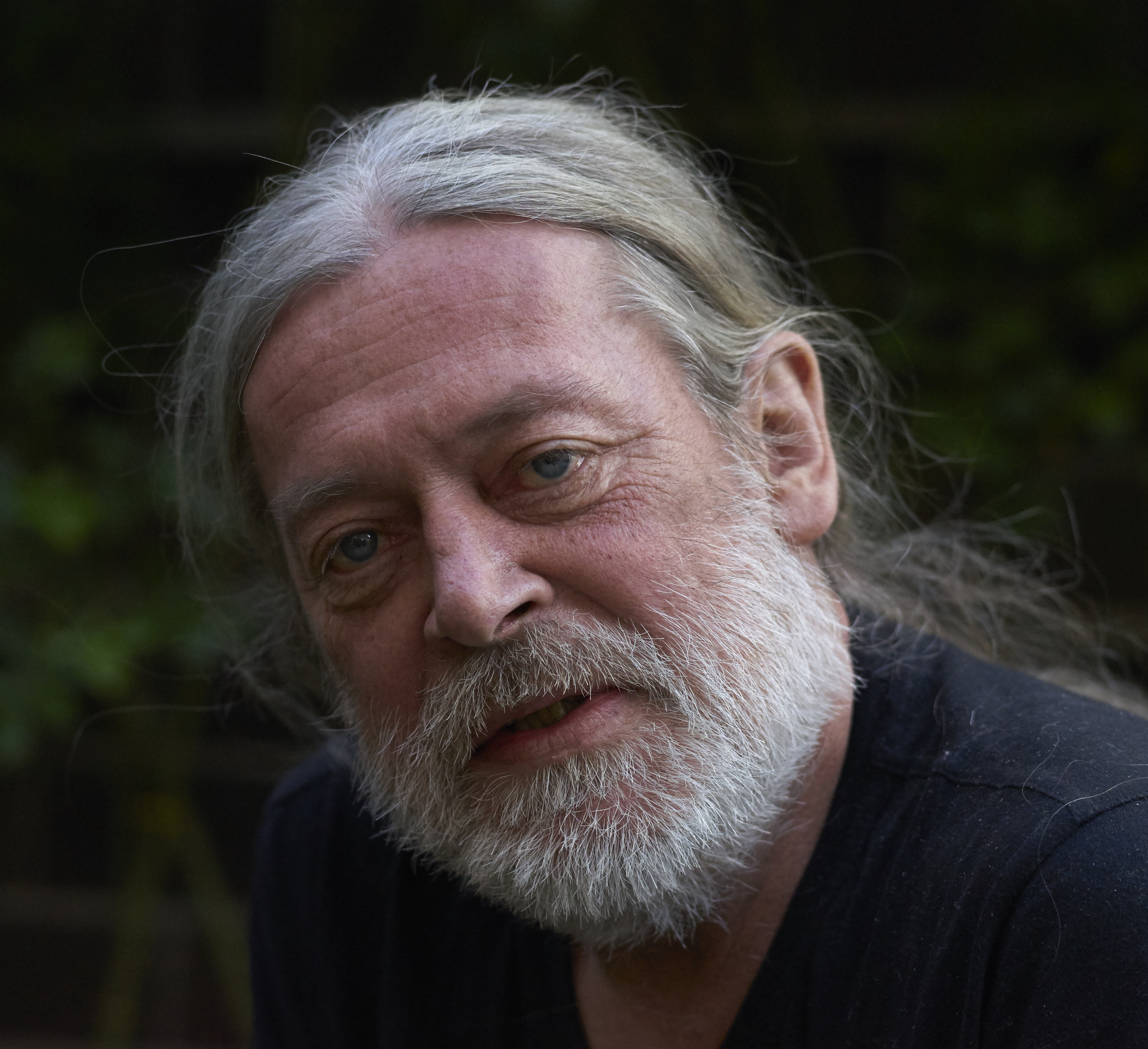
Harald Hauswald in 2015

Harald Hauswald (born 3 May 1954 in Radebeul) is a German photographer known for his boldly authentic images of everyday life in the GDR and Berlin. Together with Sibylle Bergemann and Ute Mahler he co-founded the Ostkreuz photo agency.

== Biography ==
Harald Hauswald was born in the provincial town of Radebeul near Dresden in 1954. After an apprenticeship as a photographer (1970-1972), working various miscellaneous jobs, completing his mandatory military service (1973-1974) and formal education at the Technical University Dresden (1974-1976), Hauswald finally moved to East Berlin in 1977. There, he initially worked as a telegram messenger in Prenzlauer Berg, which frequently took him across the district and gave him ample opportunity to take photographs with the camera he always carried with him. Thereafter he had several more odd jobs (including boilerman, restorer, technician at the Deutsches Theater and at a photography lab) and travelled around before returning to his trained profession as a photographer at the Stephanus Stiftung hospital and hospice in Weißensee in 1983. Prior to this, he had been to Poland in 1981, where he photographed the Solidarność Union's strikes and activities at the Gdańsk Shipyard.

The first exhibitions of his photographs took place in 1983. One was at the 'Kahn' youth club on the Insel der Jugend ('Isle of Youth') in Treptow-Berlin, and another at the popular Jugendklub Wilhelm-Pieck-Straße in Berlin-Mitte. Other exhibitions were in private apartments, community centres, and churches. A notable example was a 1985 exhibition at Meissen Cathedral, on the topic "Pollution of the Elbe River", which had to be taken down early due to content that could be interpreted as critical of the regime. Other subjects of his photographs were youth counterculture, ageing, and everyday absurd contrasts.

Hauswald's frank photography of the unglamorous daily life under the SED-dictatorship were considered 'unprintable' by mainstream publishers in the GDR. However, with the help of the few West German journalists permitted in East Berlin, he managed to publish his photography in a variety of magazines and newspapers (such as GEO, Stern, ZEITmagazin, taz, and Merian.)

In 1987 Hauswald co-authored the book Berlin-Ost: Die andere Seite der Stadt' (East Berlin: The Other Side of the City) together with dissident writer Lutz Rathenow. This (as well as his cooperation with Western journalists) gained him greater notoriety with the Stasi, who had already been surveilling him since his arrival in Berlin but intensified their harassment of him in the 1980s. In the official documentation of the MfS he was codenamed 'Radfahrer' (Cyclist), and at times he had up to 35 unofficial collaborators (IMs) reporting to the secret place on his daily activities.

Despite this, he managed to get permission to travel to West Berlin and southern Germany in 1988. The next year, in 1989, he was accepted into Association of Visual Artists (VBK) of the GDR. A nominally independent artists' organisation, the VBK was also under close surveillance by the East German state.

Since the end of the GDR regime, Hauswald has worked as a freelance photographer. He co-founded the Ostkreuz photography agency in 1990 and travelled internationally as a photojournalist during that decade. He has also been honoured for his artistic and journalistic integrity. On 23 September 1996 he was awarded the Federal Cross of Merit ribbon, which is approximately equivalent to the British Knight Companion order of chivalry. In 2006 he received the Einheitspreis for German Unity from the Federal Agency for Civic Education (Bundeszentrale für politische Bildung, stylised bpb).

For his 2007 book Alexanderplatz: Fotografische und literarische Erinnerungen ('Alexanderplatz: Photographic and Literary Memories') he was able to enlist numerous well-known authors to share their personal experiences and impressions of the Alexanderplatz. Among the contributers were writer and film director Freya Klier, satirical novelist Thomas Brussig, and journalist Alexander Osang.

In 2009, he presented several of his works at the group exhibition Ostzeit: Geschichten aus einem vergangenen Land ('EastTime: Stories from a Past Country') at the Haus der Kulturen der Welt in the Tiergarten district of Berlin.

In 2013, he published the photobook/photo essay Ferner Osten: Die letzten Jahre der DDR. Fotografien 1986–1990 ('The Far East: The Last Years of the GDR. Photographs 1986-1990).

In 2017, on the 30th anniversary of its initial publication, the Berlin-Ost volume was republished, with the new subtitle Die verschwundene Stadt ('The Vanished City'). It features a foreword by historian Ilko-Sascha Kowalczuk, who details the historical context of the publication and how the Stasi reacted to it.

In 2020, the C/O Berlin photography gallery held a major solo exhibition as a retrospective of Harald Hauswald's life and work, entitled Voll das Leben! / Retrospektive / Harald Hauswald.

== Exhibitions ==
- Ostzeit – Stories from a Vanished Country, House of World Cultures, 2009.
- Auferstanden aus Ruinen, Pool Gallery, 2009.
- 20 Years After German Unification: Critical Perspectives of Berlin Artists, 2010.
- Voll das Leben! / Retrospektive, C/O Berlin Foundation, 2020.

== Bibliography ==
- Ostberlin. Die andere Seite einer Stadt in Texten und Bildern. Munich: Piper Verlag, 1987. ISBN 978-3-492-02983-4. (in German) With Lutz Rathenow.
  - Die bibliophilen Taschenbücher 563. Dortmund: Harenberg-Ed., 1989. ISBN 3-88379-563-1. (in German)
  - Berlin: BasisDruck, 1990. ISBN 3-86163-006-0. (in German)
- Die DDR wird 50: Texte und Fotografien. Berlin: Aufbau-Verlag, 1998. ISBN 978-3-351-02479-6. (in German) Photography by Hauswald and Arno Fischer, edited by Volker Handloik and Hauswald.
- Seitenwechsel: Fotografien, 1979–1999. Berlin: Aufbau-Verlag, 1999. ISBN 978-3-351-02489-5. (in German and English)
- Die dritte Halbzeit: Hooligans in Berlin-Ost. Bad Tölz: Tilsner 2002. ISBN 3-910079-49-0. (in German) With text by Klaus Farin.
- Ost-Berlin. Leben vor dem Mauerfall / Ost-Berlin: Life before the Wall Fell Berlin: Jaron, 2005. (in German) ISBN 3-89773-522-9. With Lutz Rathenow.
- Gewendet vor und nach dem Mauerfall: Fotos und Texte aus dem Osten. Berlin: Jaron, 2006. ISBN 3-89773-532-6. (in German) With Lutz Rathenow.
- Alexanderplatz. Fotografische und literarische Erinnerungen. Berlin: Jaron, 2007. ISBN 978-3-89773-568-2. With texts by Freya Klier.
- Stadionpartisanen: Fussballfans und Hooligans in der DDR. Berlin: Neues Leben, 2007. ISBN 3-355-01744-2. Photographs by Hauswald and Knut Hildebrandt, text by Frank Willmann.
- Ultras, Kutten, Hooligans: Fussballfans in Ost-Berlin. Berlin: Jaron, 2008. ISBN 3-89773-588-1. With text by Frank Willmann.
- Auferstanden aus Ruinen Deutschland Ost: Fotos aus vier Jahrzehnten. Berlin: Jaron, 2009. ISBN 3-89773-628-4. Text by Jutta Voigt.
- Ostzeit: Geschichten aus einem vergangenen Land / Ostzeit: Stories from a Vanished Country. Ostfildern: Hatje Cantz, 2010. ISBN 978-3-7757-2486-9. Photography by Hauswald et al., texts by Marcus Jauer et al., ed. Jörg Brüggemann.
- Die Stadt. Vom Werden und Vergehen / The City: Becoming and Decaying. Ostfildern: Hatje Cantz, 2010. ISBN 978-3-7757-2659-7. (in German and English)
- Voll das Leben. 1. Edition, Steidl, 2021. Edited by Felix Hoffmann ISBN 978-3-95829-720-3. (in German and English)
