= Brigitte Zimmermann =

German journalist

Brigitte Zimmermann (born 22 May 1939) is a German journalist. Between 1983 and 1991 she was editor in chief of Wochenpost, East Germany's top selling weekly newspaper.

== Life ==
Brigitte Zimmermann was born in Sagan, a small town to the west of Breslau in Silesia. During the ethnic cleansing of 1944/45 the family were relocated, ending up in Weimar, where she grew up. This meant that from the age of 6 she lived in what was administered as the Soviet occupation zone until she was approximately 10½ at which point, in October 1949, the entire zone was relaunched as the Soviet sponsored German Democratic Republic (East Germany). Her father worked as a decorator: her mother worked in sales. By the time her mother crossed over to the German Federal Republic (West Germany), the government of East Germany, under pressure from an acute labour shortage resulting from the slaughter of war and massive emigration, was taking active steps to discourage "Republikflucht", and as a result of her mother's "desertion" Brigitte Zimmermann was blocked in her progress from her school final exams ("Abitur") to university-level studies. Instead, between 1958 and 1961 she worked as a carpenter at the VEB Mähdrescherwerks (factory) in Weimar.

She joined the ruling Socialist Unity Party ("Sozialistische Einheitspartei Deutschlands" / SED) in 1961, remaining a member until and beyond the party's demise in 1989/90. Zimmermann came to journalism through a trainee position as a youth correspondent with the mass-circulation Berlin-based daily newspaper Junge Welt ("Young World"). The newspaper took on her further training and made her its court reporter. She worked as a contributing editor with Junge Welt between 1962 and 1978, promoted to a position as departmental head in 1966 and then, from 1970, as deputy chief editor. Junge Welt throughout these years was the official newspaper of the Free German Youth ("Freie Deutsche Jugend" / FDJ), which in turn was the official youth wing of the East German SED (party). As recently as 2015 Zimmermann emerged from semi-retirement to provide for Junge Welt a tribute to Jutta Resch-Treuwerth, a distinguished former colleague on the paper who died in February of that year.

In 1965 and 1966 Zimmermann attended the International Komsomol Academy in Moscow. Following this she graduated in 1968 from the Institute of Journalism at Leipzig University, thereby obtaining, at the age of 29, a degree from the country's principal university-level journalism academy. During this time, in parallel with her work at Junge Welt, in 1973/74 she served as acting editor for the student journal, "Forum".

After her time at Junge Welt, between 1978 and 1982 Zimmermann worked with the Central Council of the FDJ, which made her a professional colleague of Egon Krenz who later emerged as the national leader. Zimmermann subsequently recalled their working relationship as "confrontational, but also sincere" ("konfliktgeladen, aber auch aufrichtig"). According to some sources, differences between the two of them nevertheless brought Zimmermann's FDJ job to an end.

In 1983 Zimmermann took over from Kurt Neheimer as editor in chief of Wochenpost, a post she retained till 1991. Towards the end of her tenure she was awarded the Patriotic Order of Merit. She was in charge at Wochenpost during the changes that led to reunification, formally in October 1990. Confronted with a new palette of competition from the newspapers in what had previously been West Germany, Wochenpost experienced a rapid drop in circulation, and a number of the less outstanding journalists had to be replaced. She nevertheless kept the publication afloat during the first year post-unification, although ultimately, in 2002, it would disappear from the market.

Zimmermann's next move, in 1991, was to Neues Deutschland, which had been the official mass-market newspaper of the old SED (party), and was by now re-inventing itself in an uncertain process that mirrored the experiences of the party itself. She served as deputy managing editor at Neues Deutschland between September 1992 and June 1999 at which point, shortly after reaching her sixtieth birthday, she embarked on a career as a freelance journalist. She continued to contribute a satirical column to Neues Deutschland.
