= Günter Rössler =

German photographer (1926–2012)

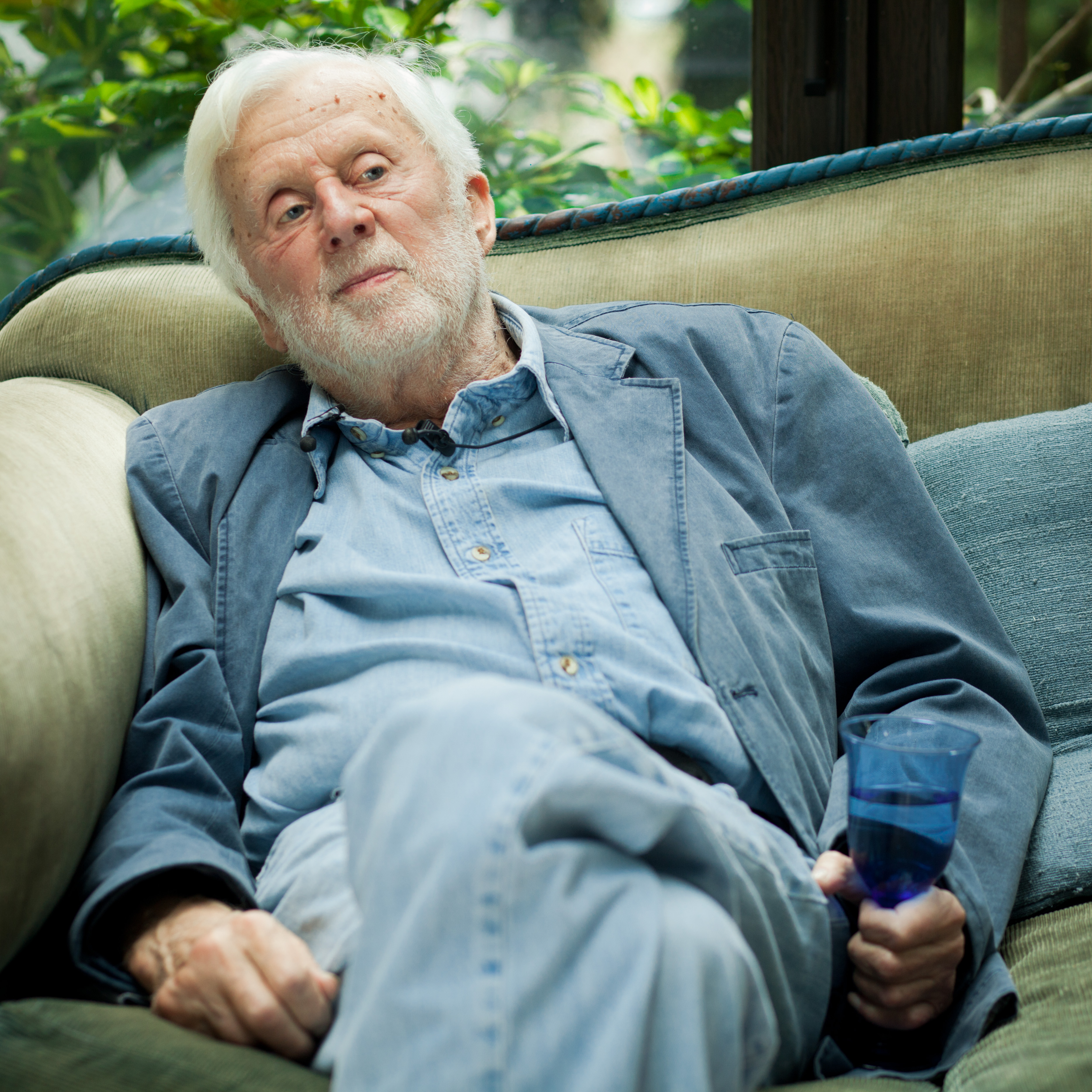
- Rössler at his home in 2009
- Born: Günter Rössler; 6 January 1926; Leipzig, Germany
- Died: 31 December 2012 (aged 86); Leipzig, Germany
- Resting place: Auenfriedhof Markkleeberg-Ost, Markkleeberg, district Leipzig
- Occupation: Photographer
- Website: Günter Rössler

Günter Rössler (6 January 1926 – 31 December 2012) was a German photographer who made a name for himself especially in the field of nude art photography. A pioneer of nude photography in East Germany and notable fashion photographer, Rössler was often referred to by the media as the Helmut Newton of East Germany, stylized since Playboy published in 1984 a photo-gallery titled: Mädchen der DDR (Girls of the GDR). Rössler however, never liked this comparison with Newton, saying: "with Newton the pose dominates, with me it is about the highest possible authenticity of the girls". Rössler significantly contributed to the history of German photography in the second half of the twentieth century, earning him recognition not only as a great photographer, but also as the "old master of German nude photography".

== Biography ==
Rössler was born in Leipzig. Between 1944 and 1945, he completed his high school education and at age 18 was immediately conscripted for military service in the German Army during World War II. On orders to recapture a hill held by the advancing Red Army, Rössler was severely wounded during the assault and one of few from his troop to have survived the hail of grenades, he was subsequently captured and taken prisoner of war. At the end of the War, Rössler left his hometown Leipzig for Bad Nauheim, where in 1946 he began working for a photo store, as salesperson, photographic laboratory technician and photo-retoucher.

Rössler began his photographer apprenticeship from 1947 and returned to Leipzig to study at the "University for Graphic and Book Design" (Hochschule für Grafik und Buchkunst). From 1951, he worked as freelance fashion and advertising photographer, as well as photojournalist. In the 1960s, Rössler devoted himself to nude photography and became one of the pioneers of this genre in East Germany.

From 1954 to 1990, Rössler was collaborating and contributing mainly to East German women's fashion magazines such as Sibylle (East Germany's equal to Vogue) and Modische Maschen, including the monthly culture and lifestyle magazine Das Magazin, as well as the photography magazines Fotografie and Fotokino-Magazin. Rössler also collaborated across the Eastern Bloc, especially with the iconic fashion-forward magazine Lada published in Sofia, Bulgaria's equal to Vogue; Lada (Bulgarian: Списание Лада), backed by its own fashion house, was referred to as the "fashion encyclopedia" of the Bulgarian woman and held high regard by women from all walks of life. It sold widely across the rest of the socialist states.

Rössler's first public exhibition of nude photographs—1979 in the "Kunsthaus Grimma"—caused sensation in East Germany. His subsequent exhibitions were also audience magnets. Since Rössler's photos were considered "not offensive", his exhibitions were also attended by school classes. Simplicity and abstraction on black and white photography make his photographs seem almost sculptural; The great naturalness of his models belonged to the concept of his nude photography.

In 1981, Rössler was admitted to the Verband Bildender Künstler der DDR (Association of Visual Artists of the GDR) and in 1996 appointed to the Deutsche Gesellschaft für Photographie (German Society for Photography).

In 1984, Playboy (West Germany-edition) published a ten-page article titled Mädchen der DDR (Girls of the GDR) with photos by Rössler. The reportage was rewarded by Playboy with the official sum of 10,000 Deutsche Mark, of which Rössler only received a mere 15%, the rest as was the usual practice in the German Democratic Republic with foreign received remuneration and currency exchange, was retained by the GDR's Ministry for Foreign Trade and Commercial Activities under Alexander Schalck-Golodkowski.

Along with East-German photographer Günter Rinnhofer, Rössler was one of the few photographers who were represented almost every month with photos in the photography magazines Fotografie and Fotokino-Magazin. Rössler worked mainly in black and white photography.

After Rössler's first wife Ruth died of cancer in 1991, Rössler later married his former model Kirsten Schlegel, 43-years his younger, whom he first met when she was 14 years old. Schlegel worked for Rössler as a model for fashion shoots and later as his assistant. They had one daughter born in 2003. In 1991, Rössler and Schlegel co-founded the photo model agency VOILÀ!.

In January 2011, on the occasion of Rössler's 85th-birthday, he appeared in an interview article by Das Magazin.

For Rössler's meritorious life's work, the city of Markkleeberg honoured the artist with the award of Medal of Honour on his 80th-birthday and entry into the Golden Book of the city. Rössler, who lived more than 50 years in Markkleeberg-East (Markkleeberg-Ost) near Leipzig, died there and was cremated on 11 January 2013 at the cemetery Auenfriedhof Markkleeberg-Ost.

== Publications ==
- Axel Bertram (compiler-editor): Aktfotografie. Greifenverlag, Rudolstadt 1992, ISBN 3-7352-0291-8.
- Akt. Edition Braus, Heidelberg 1998, ISBN 3-8295-6810-X.
- Sequenzen. Umschau Buchverlag, Frankfurt/Main 2002, ISBN 3-8295-6602-6.
- Mein Leben in vielen Akten. Verlag Das Neue Berlin, 2005, ISBN 3-360-01275-5.
- Aktfotografie 1953–2010. Verlag Das Neue Berlin, 2010, ISBN 978-3-360-02102-1.
- Starke Frauen im Osten. Fotografien 1964 bis 2009. Jaron Verlag, 2012, ISBN 978-3-89773-703-7
- Starke Frauen im Osten. Fotografien 1964 bis 2009. Limited Edition; linen bound with cover plate, hand signed and numbered. Jaron Verlag, Berlin 2012, ISBN 978-3-89773-705-1.

== Literature ==
- Roger Rössing (Hrsg.): Günter Rössler. Fotokinoverlag, Leipzig 1982.
- Thomas Tiltmann, Jana Kausch: Ästhetik des Verborgenen. Günter Rössler und die Aktfotografie der DDR. AV Akademikerverlag, Saarbrücken 2011, ISBN 978-3-639-38218-1
- Günter Rössler: Mein Leben in vielen Akten. Authored by Uta Kolano. Berlin 2005, ISBN 3-360-01275-5
- Günter Rössler. Balkanbilder. Published by Ralf C. Müller. Leipzig 2010. Eudora-Verlag, ISBN 978-3-938533-40-6
- Uta Kolano: Kollektiv d'Amour – Liebe, Sex und Partnerschaft in der DDR. Berlin 2012, ISBN 978-3-89773-669-6. With interview with Günter Rössler and Kirsten Schlegel.

== Documentary ==
- Fred R. Willitzkat: Die Genialität des Augenblicks – Der Fotograf Günter Rössler (The genius of the moment – The photographer Günter Rössler). Mitteldeutscher Rundfunk (MDR-TV), Germany 2012, 97 min., in German.
