= Sibylle (magazine) =

East German bimonthly fashion magazine (1956–1995)

- Editor-in-chief: Sibylle Gerstner; Margot Pfannstiel
- Categories: Fashion magazine
- Frequency: Bimonthly
- Publisher: Modeinstitut Berlin; Verlag für die Frau
- Founder: Sibylle Gerstner
- Founded: 1956
- Final issue: 1995
- Country: East Germany; Germany
- Based in: Berlin; Leipzig
- Language: German

Sibylle was a bimonthly fashion magazine that was published in East Germany and then in Germany from 1956 to 1995. The magazine was subtitled Zeitschrift für Mode und Kultur (German: Magazine for fashion and culture). It is known as the most famous fashion magazine of East Germany and was called Vogue of East Germany.

== History and profile ==
Sibylle was launched by a photographer, Sibylle Gerstner, in 1956. She was also the founding editor-in-chief of the magazine of which the goal was first to educate women on how to dress. In 1961 she was replaced by Margot Pfannstiel in the post. Following this change the goal of Sibylle became to encourage feminine elegance and fashion with no political concern. The magazine was published on a bimonthly basis first by the Modeinstitut Berlin and then, by the Verlag für die Frau. Therefore, the headquarters of the magazine moved from Berlin to Leipzig.

Sibylle covered brands from East German and other communist countries without featuring those reflecting the Western consumerism. In other words, it never focused on stimulating consumption or creating incentives to buy.

However, the magazine did not always represent the official approach of the state, particularly by the late 1960s and during the 1980s. Each issue of the magazine was controlled by the women's commission of the party's central committee before the publication. Ute Mahler, a photographer and curator who worked for Sibylle, argued that the East German authorities did not consider the magazine as a significant publication and therefore, censorship was not strict. Nevertheless, some of the issues of Sibylle were not permitted by the East German authorities due to its coverage of women wearing blue jeans or mini skirts; in one case, a frown was retouched into a smile.

Although Sibylle was a fashion-oriented magazine, it also covered articles dealing with art, literature, travel, theater and included interviews. The magazine allocated forty pages for fashion-related themes and the remaining forty pages for culture-related subjects. The work by German photographers Roger Melis, Günter Rössler, Werner Mahler and Sibylle Bergmann was frequently featured in the magazine. Arno Fischer was another photographer who worked for Sibylle. His revolutionary fashion photographs showing the models in the middle of the street were first published in the magazine. Dorothea Melis was one of the fashion editors of the magazine. Following her assignment to the post by Margot Pfannstiel she redesigned and modernized the magazine.

In addition to fashion photography, Sibylle included daily life photography which featured not only East Germany but also Eastern Europe countries and the Soviet Union. Those taken in Moscow were very frequent. The magazine became very popular among women due to its coverage of sophisticated self-sewing articles which was very popular in the country at that time. It was also sold in Moscow introducing the fashion trends in East Germany to the Soviet women.

For a long time the circulation of Sibylle was 200,000 copies. Following the reunification of Germany the magazine continued to be published. However, due to financial reasons Sibylle folded in 1995.

== Legacy ==
In 2001 a documentary film was made about Sibylle. It has also been subject of several exhibitions in different cities of Germany, including Rostock, Rüsselsheim and Cottbus. One of them was in Dresden which opened in April 2018. In June 2019 another exhibition entitled Sibylle – Die Ausstellung was held in Berlin.

In 2016 Ute Mahler published a book covering the photographs and other items published in Sibylle.
