= Rudi Wetzel =

German political activist and journalist

Rudi Wetzel (10 January 1909 - 31 August 1992) was a German political activist who became an East German journalist and newspaper editor after the Second World War.

== Life ==
=== Early years ===
Rudolf "Rudi" Wetzel was born in Rechenberg, a small town in the mining region of Saxony on the frontier with what was, at that time, the Austrian province of Bohemia. His father worked as a decorator and furniture painter. After leaving school he attended the Construction Academy in Dresden before embarking, in 1929, on the study of Pedagogy at the Dresden Technical University ("TU Dresden"). In 1929 he joined the Social Democratic Party of Germany ("Sozialdemokratische Partei Deutschlands"; SPD). In 1931 he switched to the Communist Party. During the next couple of years he served as a party officer as chair of the Communist Students's Association in Dresden. It was also during this time that he met the Hungarian Communist activist, Inke Rosza, who became his partner - probably also at some stage his wife.

Early in 1933 the Nazis took power and lost no time in transforming Germany into a one-party dictatorship. The Reichstag fire at the end of February 1933 was blamed on "communists" and indeed people with records as communist activists were among those most assiduously targeted by the authorities. Wetzel continued with his political activity after it became illegal and was first taken into "protective custody" in 1933, which put an end to his student career. In 1934 he was sentenced to a two-year prison term for "preparing to commit high treason". When the two years had been served he was transferred to the Sachsenburg concentration camp.

He was released in 1937, shortly after which he fled to Budapest with Inke. Then, travelling via Paris and London he made his way to Hull in eastern England where he trained and worked as a welder.

=== Swedish exile ===
In 1938 he moved on to Gothenburg and Jönköping in Sweden, where as a qualified welder he had no difficulty in obtaining work. He also joined the Swedish Metal Workers' Union.

After his emigration to Sweden the Nazi police departments back in Germany identified Wetzel as a public enemy. They incorrectly believed that he was still in Britain. Early in 1940 the Security Services in Berlin added his name to the "Sonderfahndungsliste G.B." (usually identified in English language sources as "Hitler's Black Book"), a list of (in the end) 2,820 individuals who would, in the event of a successful German invasion and occupation of Britain, be sought out by commando task forces and arrested as a priority.

In August 1939 Wetzel was the author of the so-called "Gothenburg Resolution" which was critical of the non-aggression pact concluded between Germany and the Soviet Union that month. This opened Wetzel up to criticism from the leadership of the exiled Communist Party leadership based in Moscow. Wetzel's "Gothenburg Resolution" insisted that, despite the non-aggression pact, it was still Hitler and his power structure that must be seen as the true enemies of the German working class, rather than the old imperialist powers of Britain and France that were the implicit targets of understandings between Hitler and Stalin. Walter Ulbricht, already prominent among the exiled German communists in Moscow, issued instructions that German communists in Sweden should "isolate" Wetzel. Even if subsequent events may have vindicated Wetzel's judgements, incurring the suspicions of the man who later became the first leader of the German Democratic Republic is unlikely to have boosted his career prospects in Germany's Soviet occupation zone after 1945.

In 1942 Wetzel relocated to Stockholm. The 1941 German invasion of the Soviet Union had led to a stark political reconfiguration affecting the various strands of the exiled German communist party. Wetzel's "Gothenburg Resolution" had become redundant, and by 1943 he was again fully engaged in party work. Around this time he and Inke separated, remaining on friendly terms. He became editorial secretary of "Politische Information", a German language party newspaper produced in the Swedish capital. He also produced a significant number of articles for it, often using one of a succession of pseudonyms, including "Ber Wernau", "Karl Scharf" and "Max Richter". His activities also came to the attention of the authorities in Germany, and he was formally deprived of his German nationality on 21 October 1944.

=== Soviet occupation Zone / German Democratic Republic ===
The Second World War ended in Europe in May 1945. The large central area of Germany surrounding Berlin, including Wetzel's Saxon homeland, was now administered as the Soviet occupation zone. He returned, now moving directly to Berlin, in January 1946, accompanied by his new Swedish wife, Inge: the marriage would prove short-lived. He was appointed to a senior management position with the press and broadcasting department of the Central Committee of the newly formed Socialist Unity Party ("Sozialistische Einheitspartei Deutschlands" / SED). In 1947 he became head of the foreign press section, with the title "Second Deputy Head of the Agitation Department" ("2. stellvertretender Leiter der Abteilung Agitation").

The contentious launch in April 1946 of the SED had been part of a nation building exercise planned with Moscow support by a team of leading exiled German communists during the war years and implemented during the later 1940s. In October 1949 the Soviet occupation zone was relaunched as the Soviet sponsored German Democratic Republic (East Germany), a new kind of one-party dictatorship. Wetzel was removed from his existing duties and sent to study at the "Karl Marx" Party Academy. Between 1950 and 1953 he served as managing editor of "Neuer Weg", a journal produced for SED party officials. At the same time he was a member of the presidium of the "International Journalists' Organisation".

During the early part of 1953 he was briefly editor in chief at the news-magazine "Friedenspost" (literally "Peace Post). After a few months he was switched to Wochenpost, a weekly mass-circulation newspaper newly launched by the party central committee to cover politics, economics, business and the arts. Here, as the publication's first editor in chief, he was effectively its creator, always subject to the party's requirements. Also in 1953 he took over from Karl Bittel as Chairman at the (East) German Union of Journalists ("Verband der Deutschen Presse" / VDP). However, his position became increasingly precarious after 1956.

On 27 October 1956, shocked by the attitude of the party leadership to the popular uprisings in Hungary and Poland, Wetzel joined with fellow editors to publish an open letter of protest addressed to the politburo. They called for "information faithful to the truth" ("wahrheitsgetreue(n) Informationen") and adherence to "Leninist standards of party and national life" ("Leninschen Normen des Partei- u. Staatslebens"). The wheels of the East German power structure ground into action and in January or March 1957, under pressure from the authorities, Wochenpost dispensed with the services of their founding editor. He was also removed from the chairmanship of the VDR. At the same time he was sharply criticised at a meeting of the Central Committee press department. The irritation of the leader, Walter Ulbricht, had been exacerbated by the fact that the editors' open letter to the politburo had included a line on the subject of "press freedom" which had already been rejected by the Central Committee when proposed for a prominent feature in Neues Deutschland, East Germany's principal daily newspaper. The fact that Wetzel and his fellow letter writers had included the rejected line in their open letter was seen by Ulbricht as a practical failure of personal loyalty on Wetzels' part.

During the ensuing years Wetzel was regarded with renewed suspicion by the East German leadership, and he held a succession of relatively low-profile journalistic positions. In June 1957 he became an editor with "Freie Welt", an illustrated magazine, but in February 1958 he was dismissed without notice on account of his "ideological failings" by the "Culture and Progress" publishing house. In 1959 he found an editorship with the magazine "Urania". He was also contributing to publications such as "Wissen und Leben".

=== Later years ===
In 1965 Wetzel became a freelance journalist. He wrote for the Swedish trades union newspaper "Grafis" and other Swedish publications a succession of articles about East Germany, and he contributed numerous articles about Sweden in the East German press. As an accredited journalist he also had opportunities to travel to the west.

By 1968 - possibly earlier - he was under permanent Stasi surveillance, identified as a friend of the dissident intellectual Rudolf Bahro. During 1975-77 he was involved in the preparation for publication of Bahro's important work "The Alternative", which led to the arrest of Bahro. Wetzel was on several occasions questioned by the security services about the book and its publications - openly in the west. His wife lost her job at the Academy of Sciences and Humanities. But there was a reluctance on the part of the leadership to exaggerate the significance of the work, coupled with a determination to present Bahro as a lone voice: possibly for this reason, Wetzel was not subjected to any serious state mandated retribution in respect of his involvement with "The Alternative".

Someone who had reached Wetzel's level of seniority in the journalism during the 1950s would normally have seen their eightieth birthday celebrated with a congratulatory message from the party, but early in January 1989 Wetzel's eightieth birthday passed without published comment in Neues Deutschland or any other mainstream publication. He had still not been forgiven for that open letter in 1956. Across the border in West Germany it was a different matter: newspapers such as the Frankfurter Rundschau marked the birthday of the communist "non-conformist" and "lateral thinker", quoting a maxim which he had himself used in the part: "Head held high and not the hands" ("Kopf hoch und nicht die Hände"). A couple of weeks later, however, on 25 January 1990, as the authorities struggled to come to terms with the changes slowly but surely transforming the old German Democratic Republic, an "extraordinary congress" of the VDP rehabilitated Wetzel. A few months later, still in 1990, he joined the Party of Democratic Socialism, which was a sometimes uneasy reincarnation, in contemplation of a democratic multi-party future, a relaunched version of the old SED. He did this, in his own words, "out of solidarity" ("aus Solidarität").
