= Margot Pfannstiel =

German journalist

Margot Pfannstiel (18 June 1926 - 10 October 1993) was a German journalist and author. She was Editor in Chief of the East German women's magazine Sibylle between 1958 and 1968. Both before and after her decade at Sibylle she was a chief reporter at the weekly news magazine Wochenpost.

== Life ==
Margot Pfannstiel was born in Altenburg, a country town to the south of Leipzig. Her father was an engineer. She grew up in Berlin where she was a child during the Second World War and where she attended school. She completed a commercial training and then, between 1943 and 1945, worked as a typist.

War ended in May 1945 after which a large region surrounding Berlin was administered as the Soviet occupation zone. Between 1945 and 1948 Pfannenstiel worked for the municipal administration in Miersdorf, just outside Berlin on its southeastern side. In 1947 she joined the Socialist Unity Party ("Sozialistische Einheitspartei Deutschlands" / SED), recently launched in preparation for the reinvention in 1949 of the entire occupation zone as the Soviet sponsored German Democratic Republic. Between 1948 and 1953 she worked as a volunteer reporter and journalist on the SED's mass circulation daily newspaper, Neues Deutschland.

In the wake of the events surrounding the brutally suppressed uprising of June 1953 there was discussion of replacing Walter Ulbricht as East Germany's leader. The death of Stalin three months earlier had left the East German leadership in a state of heightened nervousness, and it was not entirely clear who the new leaders in Moscow would be, nor how firm their support for Ulbricht might be. In the event Ulbricht remained in power and members of the East German political leadership who he believed had questioned his suitability for political survival were removed from positions of power or influence. Two of these were Wilhelm Zaisser and the managing editor of Neues Deutschland, Rudolf Herrnstadt. Margot Pfannstiel found herself identified as a member of the "Party-enemy Zaisser-Herrnstadt Group": she was removed from Neues Deutschland.

The weekly news magazine Wochenpost was launched in December 1953. Pfannenstiel was a co-founder and chief reporter. In 1958 she took over from Sibylle Gerstner as managing editor of the recently launched women's magazine Sibylle. Her reputation at this time was as an economics journalist, which may have made her appointment to run a women's magazine appear slightly strange, but she remained in post for ten years, so presumably the authorities were happy with her stewardship. One high profile appointment that she made, which in many ways came to outshine Pfannenstiel's own more direct contributions, involved Dorothea Melis, aged just 23 when appointed to the position of Sibylle's fashion editor.

Pfannenstiel left Sibylle in 1968, resuming her position as chief reporter at Wochenpost. She retired in 1986 but continued to work as a freelance journalist. Margot Pfannstiel died in Berlin on 10 October 1993.

== Awards and honours ==
- 1986 Patriotic Order of Merit in gold.
