= Klaus Wittkugel =

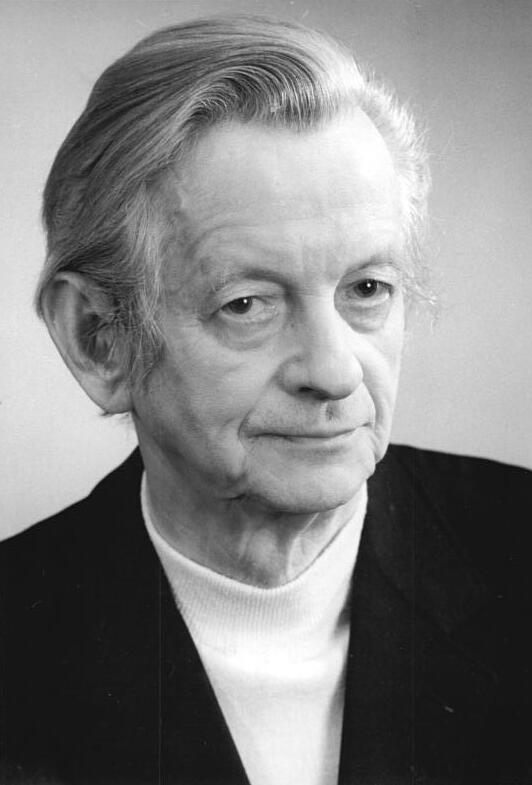
- Klaus Wittkugel (1985)
- Born: 17 October 1910; Kiel, Prussia, German Empire
- Died: 19 September 1985 (aged 74); East Berlin, East Germany
- Occupation: Graphic artist
- Political party: SED

Klaus Wittkugel (17 October 1910 – 19 September 1985) was one of the most important commercial and poster artists in the German Democratic Republic (1949–1989). For many years he was also a professor at the Berlin-Weißensee Arts Academy.

== Life ==
Wittkugel was born in Kiel in the extreme north of the country. His father was a businessman. Klaus Wittkugel himself undertook a commercial training in Hamburg between 1927 and 1929, while also attending the Hamburg State Arts Academy, and then studied in Essen at the Folkwang University of the Arts till 1932. Here he was a master-scholar of Max Burchartz. He then relocated to Berlin where between 1932 and 1935 he was employed as a commercial artist by a retail chain. From 1935 till 1937 he headed up a studio with a Berlin advertising agency, after which he worked in Berlin as a freelance commercial artist until war intervened.

He was conscripted for military service in 1939 and spent the war first as a soldier and then as a prisoner of war. War ended in May 1945, leaving what remained of Germany divided into zones of military occupation. Berlin was at the centre of a region administered as the Soviet zone of occupation which in October 1949 would be relaunched as the German Democratic Republic. In 1946 Klaus Wittkugel joined the newly formed Socialist Unity Party of Germany (Sozialistische Einheitspartei Deutschlands / SED) which in 1949 became the ruling party in the new Soviet sponsored East German state. In the meantime, between 1945 and 1949 he was employed as a graphic artist in the German (effectively East German) Central Commerce and Supply Department. He went on to work as the chief graphic artist for the Information Department till 1952. In 1949 he also obtained a teaching post at the Berlin-Weißensee Arts Academy, where he became a professor in 1952. He retained the professorship till his retirement in 1975. During these years he lived at an address in the much prized "Intellectuals' District" on the north side of East Berlin, close to "Street 201".

== Memberships ==
In 1950 Klaus Wittkugel was a founding member of the East German League of Visual Artists, membership of which quickly became, for practical purposes, mandatory for those wishing to pursue a career in the visual arts. He was the first chairman of The League's Graphic Artists' Section, and from 1984 an honorary member.

He became a member of the national Academy of Arts in 1961, serving as that prestigious institution's vice-president between 1968 and 1974.

He was a member of the Artistic Advisory Board of the Postage Stamps Commission in the Ministry of Posts and Telecommunications. Postage stamp design was important in the German Democratic Republic and it was a subject on which Wittkugel was influential. In addition he designed a succession of stamps and stamp booklet covers.

== Honours ==
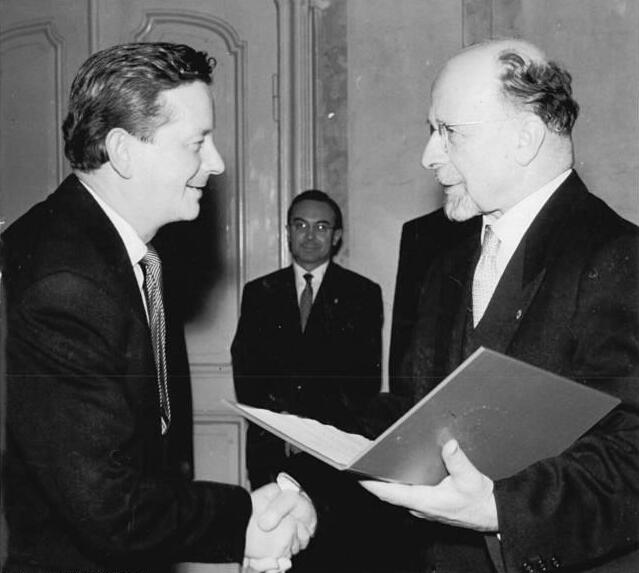
Klaus Wittkugel, on his fiftieth birthday, receiving the Patriotic Order of Merit in bronze from Walter Ulbricht

- 1958: National Prize of East Germany
- 1960: Patriotic Order of Merit in bronze
- 1963: Patriotic Order of Merit in silver
- 1969: Patriotic Order of Merit in gold
- 1970: National Prize of East Germany
- 1975: Johannes R. Becher Medal
- 1979: GDR Trades Union Federation Arts Prize
- 1980: Patriotic Order of Merit gold clasp
- 1982: Hans Grundig Medal
