= Ernst Rudolf Vogenauer =

German painter (1897–1972

- Born: 25 April 1897; Munich, Bavaria, German Empire
- Died: 29 December 1972 (aged 81); Berlin, German Democratic Republic
- Spouse: Minna Vogenauer
- Children: Georg Alexander Vogenauer

Ernst Rudolf Vogenauer (25 April 1897 – 29 December 1972) was a German graphic artist. After World War I, he worked as a poster designer and a book illustrator in East Berlin. He also designed banknotes, postage stamps, wooden toys, and ceramics.

== Early life ==
As a child, he lived in a bi-national family and was very fond of music and culture. His father, George Vogenauer (1868–1950), was a Catholic tailor from the Bavarian city of Königstein. His mother, Anna Maria née Haenni (1869–1950), was the Protestant daughter of a tailor and came from Uttigen near Bern. Ernst Vogenauer's parents were married in 1893 in Munich, where they lived from 1893 to 1945. The couple raised their four children with a taste for work and studies. Ernst was imaginative and an unstimulated child. Gifted in alto voice, violin playing and drawing, he aspired to become a graphic artist.

Ernst Rudolf's sister, Babette Vogenauer (1893–1950), emigrated to France in 1911 with her spouse and two brothers, Andreas Vogenauer, a German science teacher (1894–1952), and Gottfried Vogenauer (1902–1984), a German economics teacher and author. In 1955, Gottfried wrote a private chronicle about the Vogenauer-Haenni family tree and its German and French descendants. Gottfried also wrote a collection of poems, Reifende Seele ("Ripening Soul"). The manuscript is kept in a collection of handwritten documents at the Bavarian State Library.

== Career ==
Ernst Vogenauer studied in Munich during his early childhood and was a bright student of Fritz Helmut Ehmcke (1878–1965). At the same time, he worked for the Consee's art printing office in Munich. In 1921, he left Munich for a job at the National Printing Office in Berlin where he worked until World War II. He married his wife, Minna, in 1925, who a few years later had their first and only son. It was also at that time in the 1920s that he illustrated an edition of the Bavarian novel Der Wittiber ("The Widower") by the German writer Ludwig Thoma (1867–1921). He was gifted in various artistic crafts.

Poster "Ausstellungspark Theater-Cafe"

In spite of his respect for the Old Masters, he had an open mind about art and was attracted by futurism, cubism, and expressionism with regard to his official work for the National Printing Office of Berlin, and to avoid trouble, he often preferred to mark some of his private artistic works with the special signature "Saturn". His artistic friends were mainly Binder, Peter Kraemer (1896–1972), son of an American Bavarian painter also named Peter Kraemer, and Carl Rabus (1898–1983), a German expressionist painter, who painted a self-portrait with Vogenauer (circa 1927 to 1937) titled: Zwei Freunde, Selbst mit Ernst Vogenauer ("Two friends, Ernst Vogenauer and I"), now in the private collection of the art collector Gerhard Schneider.

Vogenauer was involved with German expressionism and participated in different international events such as the "First exhibition of modern art" in Bucharest.

After World War II, from 1946 to 1961, Vogenauer was an art teacher in the Weißensee Academy of Art Berlin (Kunsthochschule Berlin-Weißensee) in East Berlin.

== Other ==
- Private archives and documents of the French Caubet-Bachem family, descendants of the Bachem-Vogenauer and Vogenauer-Haenni families
- Private chronicle of the Vogenauer family by Gottfried Vogenauer in 1955.
