= Berlinische Galerie =

Coordinates: 52°30′15″N 13°23′56″E

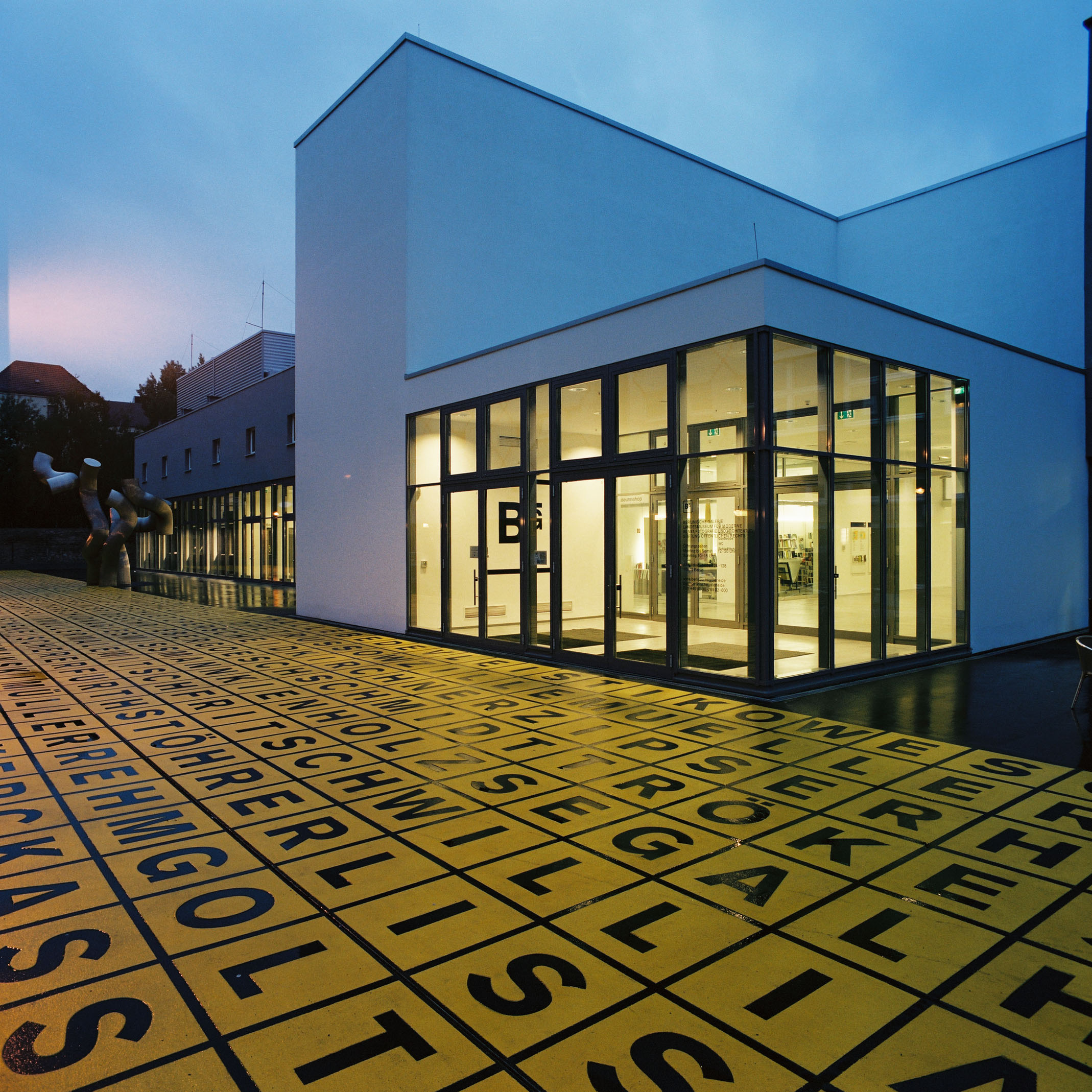
- Established: 1975
- Location: Kreuzberg, Berlin, Germany
- Type: Art museum
- Website: berlinischegalerie.de

The Berlinische Galerie is a museum of modern art, photography and architecture in Berlin. It is located in Kreuzberg, on Alte Jakobstraße, not far from the Jewish Museum. The Berlinische Galerie collects art created in Berlin since 1870 with a regional and international focus. Since September 2010, the museum's director has been the art historian Thomas Köhler, until then deputy director, succeeding Jörn Merkert. In June 2024 the Berlin Senate reappointed Köhler as director until 1 January 2029.

== History ==
The Berlinische Galerie was founded in 1975 as a society devoted to exhibiting art from Berlin. Its founding director was the art historian Eberhard Roters, who initiated the museum out of a perceived lack of attention to specifically Berlin art. Jörn Merkert directed the museum from 1987 to 2010, when he was succeeded by Köhler. For the first few years it was based in an office in Charlottenburg, and its exhibitions were displayed at the Akademie der Künste and the New National Gallery among others. In 1978 the Galerie moved into a former Landwehr officers' mess (now the Museum of Photography) on Jebensstraße, near Zoo Station. In 1986 it moved again, into the Martin-Gropius-Bau. In 1994 the collection became a public-law foundation.

In 1998 the Berlinische Galerie had to leave the Martin-Gropius-Bau due to reconstruction. After six years without a permanent home, it opened in its new location, in former industrial premises in Kreuzberg, in 2004. Built in 1965, the current building was originally a glass warehouse, and took the Galerie a year to renovate. The conversion of the former warehouse into a museum was designed by the architect Jörg Fricke. The hall, built near the Berlin Wall in the 1960s, had been used by the West Berlin Senate to store window glass as part of the city's emergency reserves during the Cold War. The museum reopened again in 2015 following a €6 million refurbishment that mainly involved updating the museum's security and technical equipment.

== Collection ==
The Berlinische Galerie collects art created in Berlin from the end of the 19th century (since 1870) to the present. The collection is interdisciplinary. Painting, sculpture, installation and media art, graphic art, photography, architecture and the documentary estates of artists are among the holdings. The collection consists of five collection areas: Fine Arts, Prints and Drawings, Photography, Architecture and Artists' Archives.

=== Fine Arts ===
The Fine Arts Collection contains around 5000 objects. Among them are works by prominent artists such as Max Beckmann, Hannah Höch, Naum Gabo, Georg Baselitz, Wolf Vostell, Ursula Sax and John Bock. Works by numerous artist groups are also represented, e.g. the Berlin Secession, Dada Berlin, the Eastern European avant-gardes, the Neue Wilde and the young art scene after the fall of the Berlin Wall in 1989. The Golden Twenties form a focal point.

=== Prints and Drawings ===
The collection Prints and Drawings comprises around 15,000 sheets, including prints and above all drawings. The works represent the diversity of art historical developments in Berlin: from Dada Berlin, late Expressionism from 1914, the Eastern European avant-garde of the 1920s to New Objectivity, New Figuration of the 1960s, East Berlin art since the construction and fall of the Wall, and contemporary drawing.

=== Photography ===
With around 73,000 photographs, the photographic collection is one of the most important in Germany. In addition to portrait, architectural and urban photography, the focus is also on advertising and fashion photography, photojournalistic works, photomontages, photograms and photographic concept works. A special feature is the artistic photography of the GDR. The museum also promotes contemporary Berlin photography through continuous and extensive acquisitions.

=== Architecture ===
The architecture collection comprises around 300,000 plans, 80,000 photographs, 4,000 design cartons for stained glass and mosaics, 2,500 models and around 800 metres of file material from estates, competitions and archives. The materials document Berlin's urban planning and architecture from 1900 to the present.

=== Artists' Archives ===
The collection preserves documentary material on artists, artist groups, gallery owners and art scholars (including the Art Nouveau artist Fidus, the November Group, the Ferdinand Möller Gallery and the sculptors Naum Gabo and Hans Uhlmann). A special focus is the extensive archive holdings on the Berlin DADA movement consisting of the estates of Hannah Höch and Raoul Hausmann.

== Exhibitions ==
=== Permanent Exhibition ===
On the upper floor, the museum's permanent exhibition entitled Art in Berlin 1880–1980 presents a selection of the main works in its collection from the fields of painting, graphic art, sculpture, photography and architecture in chronological order on more than 1,000 m^{2} (11,000 sq ft), updated by discoveries and new acquisitions. In October 2020, the tour of the collection was fundamentally renewed and presents art from the painting of the imperial period at the end of the 19th century to works of Expressionism, the Eastern European avant-garde, the architecture of post-war modernism and the Heftige Malerei of the 1970s.

=== Special Exhibition ===
The special exhibition programme on the ground floor ranges from classical modernism to contemporary art in Berlin. These are complemented by series of events with films, concerts, artist talks, curator tours and lectures.

==== List of special exhibitions (selection) ====
- 2010/2011: Nan Goldin: Berlin Work. Photographs 1984–2009
- 2010/2011: Susanne Kriemann: GASAG Art Prize 2010
- 2010/2011: Arno Fischer: Photographs 1953–2006. Hannah-Höch-Award 2010
- 2011/2012: Eva Besnyö: Woman Photographer 1910–2003. Budapest – Berlin – Amsterdam. The Berlinische Galerie plays host to Das Verborgene Museum
- 2011/2012: J. Mayer H.: RAPPORT. Experiments with Spatial Structure
- 2011/2012: Friedrich Seidenstücker: Photographs 1925–1958
- 2012: Boris Mikhailov: Time is out of joint. Photography 1966–2011
- 2012: Michael Sailstorfer: Forst. Vattenfall Contemporary 2012
- 2012/2013: The Shuttered Society. Art Photography in the GDR 1949–1989
- 2012/2013: Tue Greenfort: GASAG Art Prize 2012
- 2013: Tobias Zielony: Jenny Jenny
- 2013/2014: Vienna Berlin. The Art of Two Cities. From Schiele to Grosz (a cooperation with the Austrian museum Belvedere)
- 2014: Dorothy Iannone: This Sweetness Outside of Time. Paintings, Objects, Books 1959–2014
- 2015: Radically Modern. Urban Planning and Architecture in 1960s Berlin
- 2015/2016: Max Beckmann and Berlin
- 2016: DADA Africa. Dialogue with the Other (a partnership with the Museum Rietberg in Zurich)
- 2016: Heidi Specker: Photographs 2005/2015
- 2016: Erwin Wurm: Bei Mutti
- 2016/2017: Cornelia Schleime: A Blink of An Eye. Hannah-Höch-Preis 2016
- 2017: John Bock: In the Moloch of the Presence of Being
- 2017: Christine Streuli: Fred-Thieler-Preis 2017
- 2017: Faraway Focus. Photographers go travelling (1880–2015)
- 2017: Monica Bonvicini: 3612,54 m³ vs 0,05 m³
- 2017/2018: Jeanne Mammen: The Observer. Retrospective 1910–1975
- 2018: Loredana Nemes: Greed Fear Love. Photographs 2008–2018
- 2018: Eduardo Paolozzi: Lots of Pictures – Lots of Fun
- 2018/2019: Freedom. The art of the Novembergruppe 1918–1935
- 2019: Underground Architecture. Berlin Metro Stations 1953–1994
- 2019: André Kirchner. Berlin: The City's Edge 1993/94
- 2019: Lotte Laserstein: Face to Face
- 2019/2020: Original Bauhaus. The centenary exhibition (a cooperation project with the Bauhaus Archive Berlin, on the occasion of the 100th anniversary of the founding of the Bauhaus)
- 2019/2020: Bettina Pousttchi: In Recent Years
- 2020: Umbo Photographer. Works 1926–1956
- 2020/2021: Drawing the City. Paper-based works 1945 to the Present
- 2020/2021: Provenances. Wayfaring Art
- 2021/2022: Ferdinand Hodler and Berlin Modernism
- 2021/2022: Alicja Kwade: In Abwesenheit (In Absence)
- 2021/2022: Louise Stomps: Nature Shapes. Sculptures and Drawings 1928–1988. Das Verborgene Museum as a guest at the Berlinische Galerie
- 2022: Fashion–Clothing in Art. Photography, Fine Arts, and Fashion since 1900
- 2022: Sibylle Bergemann: Town and Country and Dogs. Photographs 1966–2010
- 2022/2023: Magyar Modern. Hungarian Art in Berlin 1910–1933 (a partnership with the Museum of Fine Arts in Budapest – Hungarian National Gallery)

== Friends of the Museum: Förderverein ==
For over 45 years, the Friends have been supported by around 1700 members (as of 2023), who support the work of the museum primarily financially. This also includes the members of "Jung und Artig", the circle of young friends. In addition to free museum admission, they receive special tours, studio visits, excursions and previews.

== See also ==
- List of art museums
- List of museums in Berlin
- List of museums in Germany

== Bibliography ==
- Van Uffelen, Chris. Contemporary Museums – Architecture, History, Collections, Braun Publishing, 2010, ISBN 978-3-03768-067-4, pages 222–223.
- Berlinische Galerie (ed.): Berlinische Galerie – Museum für Moderne Kunst, 2014, ISBN 978-3-7774-2460-6 (in German).
