= Wochenpost =

East German newspaper

- Ceased publication: 1996
- Language: German
- Country: East Germany

The Wochenpost (English: Weekly Post) was an East German weekly. It was founded in 1953, and circulation peaked at over one million copies per issue from 1971 to the German reunification. The academic Deirdre Byrnes writes that the paper was "one of the most influential" publications in East Germany. Its highest circulation was around 1.2 million copies, making the paper the most popular weekly in East Germany. Wochenpost considered a paper for intellectuals. The paper continued to be published after German reunification until it ceased publication in late December 1996.

The model for the Wochenpost was Die Grüne Post (The Green Post). Like the NBI (Neue Berliner Zeitung – New Berlin Newspaper), the Wochenpost covered a broad spectrum of cultural and political topics in East Germany, ranging from daily politics at home and abroad, to art and culture, and including reports on science, sports, and technology. In addition to recommendations on current fashion trends, it regularly featured advice columns with tips on health, cooking, and DIY projects, as well as television listings, various classified ads, and a puzzle page.

The magazine was published weekly by Berliner Verlag. The logo for the Wochenpost, under which it appeared for more than 40 years, was designed by the illustrator and graphic artist Johannes Hegenbarth.

== History ==
The paper published its first issue on 22 or 23 December 1953, around Christmas. The cover of the first issue was a depiction of a child blowing a candle out with the words "to all who are of goodwill."

It was co-founded by Margot Pfannstiel, who also worked as chief reporter, Heinz Knobloch, who took responsibility for "puzzles, mental recreation and humour" ("Rätsel, Denksport und Humor"), and Hilde Eisler. Pfannstiel left in 1958 and returned in 1968.

Its first editor-in-chief was Rudi Wetzel, who lost his job shortly after protesting the Soviet invasion of Hungary in 1956. Other members of the founding editorial team included Emil Rudolf Greulich, Peter Nell and Walther Victor.

Circulation of the paper peaked at over one million copies per issue from 1971 to the German reunification. The academic Deirdre Byrnes writes that the paper was "one of the most influential" publications in East Germany.

Work on the Wochenpost quickly became a principal vehicle for Heinz Knobloch over more than three decades. He served as its culture editor from 1957 to 1965, and between 1968 and 1988 contributed a weekly Feuilleton-format opinion column under the heading "With Both Eyes", and remained a feature writer until 1991. His feature articles were illustrated by Wolfgang Würfel.

The cartoonist Willy Moese drew several comic strips for the Wochenpost. Rudolf Hirsch (Schriftsteller) contributed court reports, covering both sensational trials against Nazi criminals, such as the Frankfurt Auschwitz trials and the Lischka trial, and more day-to-day crimes. For many years, Horst Rittner edited the chess column, which alternated between annotated games and chess compositions. Rosemarie Rehahn wrote film reviews and actor profiles.

The paper was popular as a source of "practical advice", such as how to decorate an apartment and how to dress fashionably. Wochenpost was not an opposition paper; the journalist Klaus Polkhen, who worked at the paper for many years, noted that it was "no more opportunistic than its readers".

After the German reunification, the paper was purchased by Gruner + Jahr and Robert Maxwell and relaunched in Berlin. From 1983 to 1991, Brigitte Zimmermann was editor in chief of the paper. By 1994 it was selling around 100,000 copies per week. The Independent compared the paper to Die Zeit. The paper was struggling by 1996 and ceased publication in late December.
