= Sibylle Bergemann =

German photographer (1941-2010)

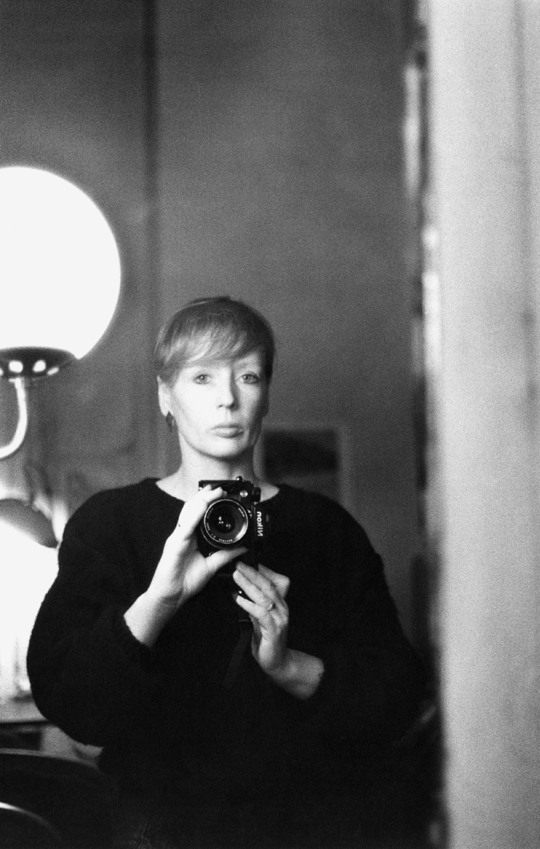
- Self portrait Sibylle Bergemann
- Born: 29 August 1941; Berlin, Germany
- Died: 1 November 2010 (aged 69); Gransee, Brandenburg, Germany
- Occupation: Photographer
- Spouse: Arno Fischer (m. 1985)

Sibylle Bergemann (29 August 1941 – 1 November 2010) was a German photographer. In 1990, she co-founded the Ostkreuz photographers agency. She is remembered for documenting developments in East Berlin during the Communist era and for her international assignments for Stern and later for Geo.

== Early life ==
Bergemann completed clerical training in East Berlin between 1958 and 1960. She developed an interest in photography while working on the editorial staff of the East German entertainment periodical Das Magazin. In 1966 she began to study photography under the photographer and university teacher Arno Fischer, who became her lifelong partner.

== Career as photographer ==
After first contributing to leading East German periodicals of the time, Das Magazin and Sonntag, in the early 1970s, her photographs started to appear in the women's fashion magazine Sibylle where she soon developed her own style. Her portraits were not analytical but rather descriptive, showing people as they appeared in real life. She moved on from fashion to photograph first her own country, East Germany, and later the rest of the world. In 1990, together with Ute Mahler and Harald Hauswald, she founded the Ostkreuz agency, which now represents a score of photographers.

Perhaps Bergemann's most important legacy is the series of black-and-white photographs she took of everyday life in East Germany as it evolved over the years. Later, she compiled photographic reportages about New York City, Tokyo, Paris and São Paulo; and even more recently, turning from black and white to colour, she travelled through Africa and Asia on assignments for Geo.

== Recognition ==
In 1994, Bergemann's talent was recognized when she became a member of Academy of Arts, Berlin. In 2007, she held an exhibition of her work at the Museum für Photographie in Braunschweig. The Museum of Modern Art in New York City holds twelve prints by Bergemann.

== Publications ==
=== Publication by Bergemann ===
- Polaroids. Berlin: Hatje Cantz, 2011. ISBN 978-3-7757-2843-0. With texts by Jutta Voigt, Bernd Heise, Frieda von Wild, and Arno Fischer. In German and English.

=== Publications with contributions by Bergemann ===
This list is not complete.

- Die Stadt. Vom Werden und Vergehen / The City. Becoming and Decaying. Ostfildern: Hatje Cantz, 2010. ISBN 978-3-7757-2659-7. In German and English.
- Ostzeit. Geschichten aus einem vergangenen Land / Stories from a Vanished Country. Ostfildern: Hatje Cantz, 2010. ISBN 978-3-7757-2486-9. In German and English.

== Exhibitions ==
- 2019–20 Medea Insurrection: Radical Women Artists Behind the Iron Curtain
