= Arno Fischer =

German photographer (1927–2011)

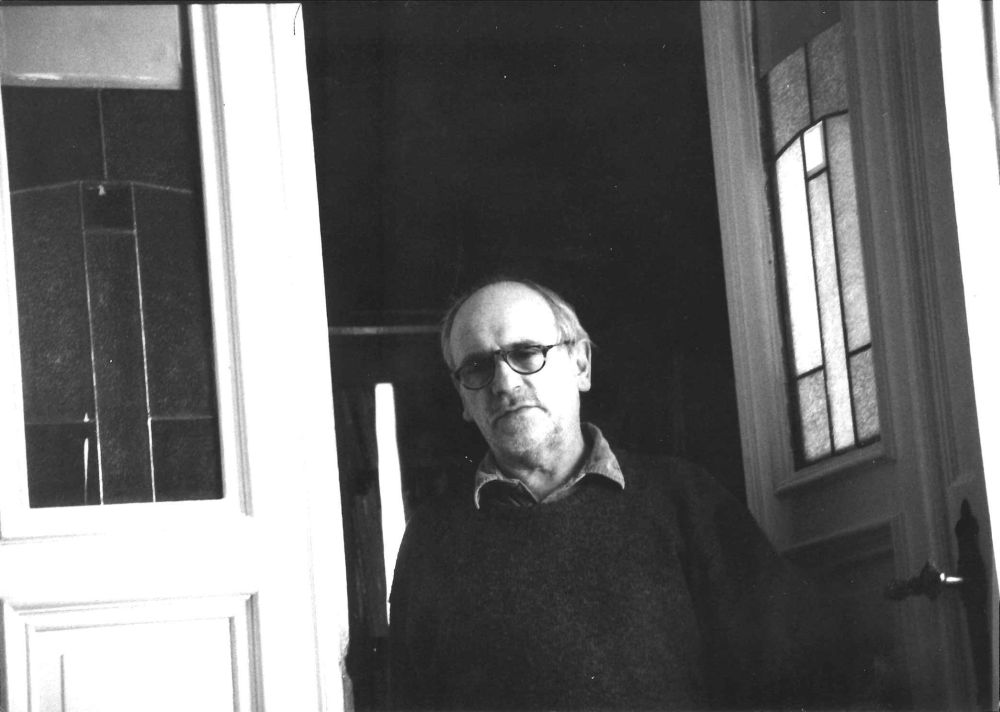
- Fischer circa 1995
- Born: 14 April 1927; Bezirk Wedding, Berlin, Germany
- Died: 13 September 2011 (aged 84); Neustrelitz, Mecklenburg-Vorpommern, Germany
- Occupation: Photographer
- Spouse: Sibylle Bergemann (m. 1985; died 2010)

Arno Fischer (Wedding, Berlin, 14 April 1927 – Neustrelitz, 13 September 2011) was a German photographer and university teacher.

== Life ==
=== Early years and war ===
Arno Fischer's father worked as a type setter. Arno attended school locally from 1933 till 1941 when he started training in aspects of carpentry (wood carving/modelling, pattern making). On reaching the age of 17 he joined the army in 1944/45, concluding his military career as a prisoner of war held by the British, who released him in 1946.

=== A lengthy training in sculpture ===
He was able to resume his civilian life in 1947, studying at the Käthe Kollwitz art school in Berlin where initially he attended drawing classes before switching to (wood) sculpture. He moved on in 1948 to Berlin's Weißensee Arts Academy where he continued with his study of sculpture and where he remained till 1951. By this time the political division of Berlin between the eastern part, which was administered by the Soviets and the western parts of the city, divided into three sectors controlled respectively by the French, the British and the Americans, was looking more permanent than had been widely anticipated a few years earlier, and the move to Weißensee involved a move from West Berlin to East Berlin. He moved on again in 1951, and from then till 1953 he was a student at the (recently renamed) Weißensee Academy of Art Berlin back in West Berlin, studying sculpture under Alexander Gonda.

Major exhibitions

Solo Exhibitions:

- 1985: Fotogalerie Friedrichshain, Berlin, Fotografien aus vier Jahrzehnten
- 1995: Laurence Miller Gallery, New York City, Berlin – Before the Wall
- 1996: Vidéothèque de Paris, Paris, Frankreich, Arno Fischer
- 1997: Staatliche Galerie Moritzburg, Halle/Saale, Arno Fischer. Photographien
- 1998: Galerie Zimmer, Düsseldorf, Arno Fischer. Ost-West-Berlin und andere Photographien 1943–1990
- 2000: Haus der Fotografie, Hannover, Arno Fischer. Photographien 1943–1989
- 2002: Literaturforum in the Brecht House (Berlin)
- 2002: Galerie Rosenkranz, Chemnitz, Arno Fischer. Der Garten
- 2005: Galerie argus fotokunst, Berlin, New York Ansichten 1978 und 1984
- 2006: Galeria Miejska we Wroclawiu, Wroclaw; Centrum Kultury Zamek, Galeria "pf" Poznan, Polen, Arno Fischer. Fotografie
- 2006: Comptoir-Kunstmagazin – Städtische Galerie, Sonneberg, Arno Fischer. New York. Fotografien 1978/1984
- 2007: Leonhardi Museum Dresden, Arno Fischer. Der Garten
- 2007: Galerie argus fotokunst, Berlin, Arno Fischer. Portraitfotografien
- 2007: Pankow Gallery, Berlin, Arno Fischer. Am Wege. Fotografie
- 2008: Kunstmuseum Moritzburg Halle (Saale), Arno Fischer. Der Garten
- 2009: Robert Morat Galerie, Hamburg, Arno Fischer. Der Garten
- 2009: Kunst- und Ausstellungshalle der Bundesrepublik Deutschland; Diesel Power Arts Museum, Cottbus; Eine Ausstellung des Instituts für Auslandsbeziehungen e. V.; Arno Fischer. Retrospektive
- 2010/2011: Berlinische Galerie – Fotografien 1953–2006. Hannah Höch Prize 2010
- 2010/2011: Hall of Exhibitions, Salamanca/Spanien; Kunstmuseum, Santander/Spanien; Eine Ausstellung des Institute for Foreign Cultural Connections
- 2012: Muzeum Historii Fotografii w Krakowie/Museum für Geschichte der Fotografie Krakau; Eine Ausstellung des Institute for Foreign Cultural Connections
- 2012/16. – 9 August. September : "ARNO FISCHER – Besuchen" in der Galerie SPRECHSAAL (Berlin – Mitte).
- 2012: Staatliches Museums- und Ausstellungszentrum ROSFOTO St. Petersburg; Eine Ausstellung des Institute for Foreign Cultural Connections

Joint Exhibitions:

- 1982: Ausstellungszentrum am Fučíkplatz, Dresden, Kunstausstellung der DDR
- 1984: Altes Museum, Berlin, Alltag und Epoche. Werke bildender Kunst der DDR aus fünfunddreißig Jahren
- 1986: Staatliche Kunstsammlungen, Cottbus, Fotografie in der Kunst der DDR
- 1987: Arles, Frankreich, Fotofestival Les Rencontres Internationales de la Photographie
- 1990: Braga, Portugal, Fotofestival Encontros da imagem
- 1991: Friedrich-Naumann-Stiftung, Königswinter (mit Ulrich Wüst)
- 1991: Centro Andaluz de la Fotograia, Almeria, Spanien, Imagina. Proyecto en torno a la otograia,
- 1991: Centre Régional de la Photographie Nord, Pas-de-Calais, Douchy-les-Mines Frankreich Berlin 1943–1990 d‘Arno Fischer
- 1992: Berlinische Galerie, Landesmuseum für Moderne Kunst, Fotografie und Architektur, Berlin, Nichts ist so einfach wie es scheint. Ostdeutsche Photographie 1945–1989
- 1992–1999: Tourneeausstellung des Instituts für Auslandsbeziehungen e. V., (ifa) in 16 Ländern und 33 Städten, Zustandsberichte. Deutsche Fotografie der 50er bis 80er Jahre in Ost und West
- 1993: Lissabon, Portugal, Fotofestival Mês da Fotograia
- 1997: Berlinische Galerie, Landesmuseum für Moderne Kunst, Fotografie und Architektur, Berlin, Positionen künstlerischer Photographie in Deutschland seit 1945
- 1998: Galerie am Fischmarkt, Erfurt, Signaturen des Sichtbaren – Ein Jahrhundert der Fotografie in Deutschland
- 1999: Kunstverein Ludwigshafen am Rhein, Zwischen Abstraktion und Wirklichkeit – Fotografie der 50er Jahre
- 2000: Fotogalerie Friedrichshain, Berlin, Fünfzehn Jahre Fotografie
- 2002: Berlinische Galerie, Landesmuseum für Moderne Kunst, Fotografie und Architektur, Berlin Paarungen – Künstlerische Positionen im Dialog
- 2003: Galerie für Zeitgenössische Kunst Leipzig, Öffentlich Privat. Das Bild des Privaten in der deutschen Nachkriegsfotografie
- 2004: Théâtre de la Photographie et de l‘Image, Nizza, Frankreich, La photographie allemande
- 2004: Wohnung Schiffbauerdamm 12, Berlin, Finissage. Abschied vom Schiffbauerdamm
- 2005: Willy-Brandt-Haus, Berlin, Utopie und Wirklichkeit – Ostdeutsche Fotografie 1956–1989
- 2006: Mori Art Museum, Tokio, Japan; Neue Nationalgalerie, Staatliche Museen zu Berlin, Preußischer Kulturbesitz, Berlin, Tokio-Berlin/Berlin-Tokio – Die Kunst zweier Städte
- 2006: Robert Morat Galerie, Hamburg, Sibylle Bergemann. Arno Fischer. Photographien
- 2006: Städtische Galerie, Sonneberg, Sibylle Bergemann. Arno Fischer. Photographien
- 2007: Cornerhouse Manchester – International Centre for Contemporary Visual Arts and Film, Manchester; University of Hertfordshire Galleries, Hatield, Großbritannien, Do Not Refreeze. Photography behind the Berlin Wall
- 2008: Edition Braus Wachter Verlag Galerie, Heidelberg, Menschenbilder. Sibylle Bergemann, Arno Fischer
- 2008: Kunst-Raum im Deutschen Bundestag, Berlin, Von Kunst und Politik. Fotografie in der Sammlung des Deutschen Bundestages
- 2008: Focal Point Gallery, Southend-on-Sea, Großbritannien, Do Not Refreeze – Photography Behind the Berlin Wall
- 2008: Städelsches Kunstinstitut und Städtische Galerie, Frankfurt a. M., REAL – Aus der Sammlung der DZ BANK
- 2009: Los Angeles County Museum of Art, Los Angeles, USA/Germanisches Nationalmuseum, Nürnberg; Deutsches Historisches Museum, Berlin, Art of Two Germanys/Cold War Cultures; Kunst und Krieg/Deutsche Positionen 1945–89
- 2009: Akademie der Künste, Berlin, Kunst und Revolte ‚89. Übergangsgesellschaft. Porträts und Szenen 1980–1990
- 2010: Eros und Stasi. Ostdeutsche Fotografie Sammlung Gabriele Koenig. Ludwig Forum für Internationale Kunst, Aachen
- Kunst- und Ausstellungshalle der Bundesrepublik, Deutschland, Bonn, Deutsche Fotografie. Macht eines Mediums. 1870–1970
- 7. Internationale Fototage Mannheim/Ludwigshafen, Die Kunst, Deutsche(r) zu sein

=== Photography ===
Later, Fischer recalled that he took his first photograph in 1944, of Berlin burning as Germany's defeat in the war loomed. He never received any formal training in photography; but nor, after 1944, did he ever lose his interest in it, and as his studies progressed he became aware that he was unlikely ever to make much money out of sculpture. His move into the world of photography started in 1955/56 with a year as a laboratory assistant at an X-ray institute. In 1956 he returned to the Arts Academy in Weißensee with a mandate to set up an archive, work as a general assistant, and "take photographs". By 1957, still without any formal photographic training, he had a job with The Academy as Senior Assistant to Prof. Klaus Wittkugel, a position he retained till 1971.

In addition he undertook photo-journalistic assignments for the fashion and arts women's magazine Sibylle and for other periodicals. His growing body of fashion and travel photography from the second part of the 1950s was set firmly in the new life photography movement. Fischer later said that the focus of his photography work was on the condition of society, the interpersonal relationships of people, the core condition of the individual and his/her existence. These features are abundantly evident in Situation Berlin, another project on which he worked between 1953 and 1960. By 1960 he was working intensively on preparing for the publication of the resulting collection by Edition Leipzig, evoking the moods and sights of the rapidly changing city in the 1950s. Pictures from the book, by now fully written and prepared for launch, were on display on the publisher's stand at the Leipzig Book Fair in the autumn of 1961. The fair was held shortly after the government had suddenly started their feverish construction of the Berlin Wall, which for the next (nearly) three decades would cut off East Berlin from the west. A group of officials stopped off at the publisher's stand to look at some of the pictures on display under the "Situation Berlin" banner. One said to the others the chilling words, "Berlin ist kein Situation mehr" ("Berlin is no longer a situation"). The reference was regarding the exodus of East Germans to the west through Berlin that had been blocked by the new wall, but the meaning for Arno Fischer and his publishers was that Situation Berlin would not be published in the foreseeable future.

=== Middle years ===
Arno Fischer was once asked whether in the wake of his experience with Situation Berlin he was ever tempted to try and escape from East Germany, but while he sometimes found the country's bureaucratic constraints limiting, he was generally accepting of the situation in which he found himself. A change of managing editor at Sibylle gave him freedom to develop, apply and promote his own ideas on fashion photography, while status as a distinguished photojournalist gave him excellent travel entitlements: some of his most celebrated fashion/celebrity shots, notably a set taken of Marlene Dietrich in 1964, were taken while traveling on assignment in Moscow. In 1965/66 he and a like-minded group of East German photographers founded a Photographers' Group which in 1969 became known as Direkt. Mutual acceptance of and by the establishment was also evident in the guest lectureship which he held in 1972/74 at the Higher Academy for Visual Arts (HGB / Hochschule für Grafik und Buchkunst) in Leipzig. From 1975 till 1982, together with Peter Voigt he was responsible for selecting the photographs shown on the Image Display Pillars flanking the Marx-Engels Forum which contained Ludwig Engelhardt's politically important Marx Engels Memorial. In 1981 Fischer was involved in the co-founding of the Photographers' Working Group in the national Visual Artists' Association (VBK) and 1983 he took a teaching contract back at the HGB, where between 1985 and 1993 he held a position as Professor for Photographic Arts.

=== Changes ===
Changes experienced during the build-up to reunification and its aftermath brought upheaval to the world of women's fashion magazines: Sibylle, after struggling on for a few more years, finally ran out of money in 1995. More positively, Fischer's international reputation was no longer constricted by the political isolationism of the old German Democratic Republic. With his wife, he involved himself in "Almediterrana 92", a major photographic project in Spain, and his work was increasingly exhibited across and beyond Germany. Situation Berlin was finally published in 2001. On the teaching front, Fischer took a lectureship in photographic journalism at the University of Applied Sciences and Arts in Dortmund, which he retained till 2000, and there was also a new teaching contract in Leipzig in 1993.

== Personal ==
In 1985 Fischer married Sibylle Bergemann, a former student who by this time was developing a formidable reputation of her own as a photographer.

Fischer died on 13 September 2011, less than a year after the passing of his wife.

== Public awards ==
- 1986 National Prize of East Germany
- 2000 Dr. Erich Salomon Award from the German Society for Photography
- 2010 Hannah Höch Prize for a lifetime of artistic accomplishment
