= Ute Mahler =

German photographer

- Born: Ute Schirmer; October 29, 1949 (age 76); Berka (Sondershausen), East Germany
- Education: Hochschule für Grafik und Buchkunst Leipzig
- Occupations: Photographer; Lecturer
- Spouse: Werner Mahler

Ute Mahler (née Schirmer; born 1949) is a German photographer. In 1990 she and her husband Werner Mahler were two of the seven co-founders of the "Ostkreuz" photography agency. Between 2000 and 2015, she was a professor of photography at Hamburg University of Applied Sciences.

== Biography ==
=== Provenance and early years ===
Ute Schirmer was born in Berka (Sondershausen) in the countryside north of Erfurt (Thuringia) and west of Leipzig. Her birth came three weeks after the region administered as the Soviet occupation zone was rebranded and relaunched as the Soviet sponsored German Democratic Republic (East Germany). It was in the German Democratic Republic that Schirmer grew up and, for nearly two decades, built a successful career as a photographer. Many of the well judged photographs, mainly of people, for which she is celebrated today were produced during that period, in the full knowledge that there was very little likelihood that they would ever be seen by anyone other than the photographer and her friends. In East Germany she would be known to the public primarily as a fashion photographer.

After her father's death in 2001 Ute Mahler found hundreds of photo-negatives that he had hidden away in the attic. These were his "personal unofficial photographs". In 2003 she arranged for a selection from the 1950s to be published.

"My father never received any training [in photography] but he was incredibly talented ... yet he placed no value on these honest authentic pictures. He thought that his carefully staged publicity images were more important."

Ute Mahler interviewed by Rory MacLean in 2010

Ludwig Schirmer (1929–2001), her father, had recently qualified as a miller and at the time of her birth worked in the village mill. He was also a passionate and talented amateur photographer, taking pictures of family and friends, weddings and other celebrations in the village. When Ute was around twelve everything changed, as he relocated the family to Lehnitz and, in 1961 opened a photographic studio in nearby Berlin. He had already by this time undertaken some paid photographic commissions in Thuringia, photographing agricultural machinery for a local tractor factory, but the move was nevertheless something of a leap in the dark. His pictures - at least the ones for which he was paid - were highly stylised and glossy publicity images, following the fashions of those times. There were pictures of combine harvesters, party officials and, his daughter would later recall, "hundreds of orchestral conductors". Increasingly successful commercially, Ludwig Schirmer was delighted that his daughter seemed to share his joy in photography, repeatedly insisting, "Ute, you're a [natural] photographer". Ute knew she could never be an "establishment photographer" of publicity images, and was totally unaware of her father's (secret) portfolio of private work: as a teenager she therefore rejected his encouragement. When she took pictures it was not in contemplation of a career in the visual arts, but because she felt herself driven to capture truth and reality.

=== Student years ===
After successfully completing her school career Ute Schirmer moved on to take an unpaid internship, which was a frequent prerequisite for university-level education in the German Democratic Republic, which had been left with a desperate shortage of working-age population thanks to the slaughter of war and mass emigration to the west during (especially) the 1950s. Schirmer work was at the "DEWAG", the party directed organisation that enjoyed a monopoly on advertising in East Germany. Based in Berlin, the DEWAG had branches across the country, and was responsible for various types of public information board and posters. In 1969 she enrolled at the "Hochschule für Grafik und Buchkunst" (loosely, "Fine Arts Academy") in Leipzig, emerging in 1974 with a degree in photography. While studying at the Leipzig academy, in 1972, Ute Schirmer teamed up with her near contemporary at Leipzig, Werner Mahler. It was the start of an active professional partnership lasting more than forty years. Shortly after she graduated, Ute Schirmer married Werner Mahler. The couple's son was born in 1975.

=== Freelancer ===
Although only a few months older than her husband, Werner Mahler had enrolled at the "Hochschule" four years later, and was therefore still less than halfway through his course in 1974/5 when Ute Mahler embarked on her professional career.

"We knew perfectly well that one out of three people was a Stasi member [or informer]. But nothing much happened. We did our work, took photos and staged exhibitions. However, we did not go as far as the dissidents who became active in the late 1970s. The reason why people in the photos have such expressions? I think people had arranged themselves [with the system]. There was the official country and the unofficial one. Those people who today are nostalgic and who transfigure experiences are talking about unofficial, private life, about being with family and friends where people felt safe."

Ute Mahler discussing life in the German Democratic Republic with her husband, Daniel Boese, Claudia Wahjudi and Jörg Colberg in 2009

She earned her living as a fashion photographer, working principally for Sibylle, the bimonthly East German fashion and arts magazine, based initially in Berlin and latterly in Leipzig, which over a long period frequently achieved circulation figures in excess of 200,000. As a freelancer she also contributed fashion images to other publications including, after 1990, the Hamburg-based weekly mass-circulation news magazine Stern. During the East German phase of her career censorship became part of life, but whether through self-censorship or through the way her images resonated with the authorities, Mahler generally carried the censorship burden relatively lightly. But there was the fashion shoot for which she decided to photograph her model on a construction site, surrounded by a form of wire cage. Her editor refused to publish the image: when she asked why not she received only the reply: "You know why not". She did. Sibylle's popularity with readers and focus on fashion may have ensured a measure of respect from the authorities which would not have extended to more obviously political publication. It did publish plenty of pictures which keen eyed readers could readily have construed as "political", but as Maher later explained to an interviewer, "...you have to be able to read images. Few of those in power could do that. And if someone found something, we could always say: I don’t understand, the picture only shows ... this and that. They had to show that the symbolic aspect of a photo was intended the way it could be understood."

She also raised her public profile as the "portraitist of the eastern rockers", producing all the "official" photo-portraits of Tamara Danz and Danz' rock group Silly through the 1980s. In 2014 that earned her plaudits from a reviewer in the Süddeutsche Zeitung who wrote that, "Mahler's trademark is this pared back, quiet, ostensibly casual imagery which gives her work from back then a timeless coolness". (Note: "Ute Mahlers Markenzeichen ist die reduzierte, leise, wie beiläufige Bildsprache geworden, sie gibt ihren Arbeiten von damals eine zeitlose Coolness...")

=== Ostkreuz ===
After reunification Ute and Werner Mahler were founder members of the Berlin-based "Ostkreuz" photography agency, which operates under a co-operative ownership structure.

"We [members of the OstKreuz co-operative] saw - still see - ourselves as documentary photographers, with a subjective perspective. I know that's a contradiction in terms, but we believe that objectivity is at best an illusion. Each photographer has his or her individual language and approach. There is nothing posed or contrived in our work. We don't have illusions"

Ute Mahler interviewed by Rory MacLean in 2010

She later explained the thinking behind the project to an interviewer: "Everything changed in 1990. Everything was new. Everything. We set up Ostkreuz as a survival strategy ... In those first days we had no idea how to run a [photographic] agency. We couldn't even sort ourselves a fixed telephone line. So we went across to West Berlin and spent 7,000 Marks on a Siemens mobile phone (Note: 7,000 Marks in 1990 was equivalent to slightly more than €5,000 or $6,000 in 2020.) ... [it] was too valuable to leave lying round the office. It weighed more than 5 kilograms (11 lb). We took it in turns to drag it home each evening. It was the only way people could contact us.

Over two decades "Ostkreuz" has grown into one of Germany's most successful agencies, despite an underlying ethical basis that rejects the cancerous growth in populism and commercialism that have been features of the period. Every few years the members take stock of progress, with a new book and exhibition, examining from the perspective of the nation some of the fundamental societal issues of homestead, identity, old age and hope. In 2005 the agency set up its own photographic academy: Mahler became a lecturer.

=== University-level teaching ===
For thirteen years Mahler held a teaching post at the fashion department of the Burg Giebichenstein Kunsthochschule (loosely. "Burg Giebichenstein Arts Academy") in Halle. Between 2000 and 2015 she also held a university professorship at the Hamburg University of Applied Arts and Sciences.

== Recognition ==
A number of Germany's most celebrated public collections hold photographs by Mahler. These include the Berlinische Galerie museum of modern art, photography and architecture, the F. C. Gundlach collection and the German Historical Museum collection in Berlin. They can also be found in the Kunstmuseum Moritzburg Halle (Saale) and in Cottbus at the Brandenburg Region Museum of Modern Art.

== Style ==
"Coming from the great and rich so-called 'live photography' tradition, Mahler's visual language is undoubtedly shaped by photo-reportage. But her own highly original way of seeing things discloses her personality and her concerns far beyond what is to be found in the usual quickly assembled image-based reporting. In determining the precise moment at which a situation becomes uncompromised and communicative, sometimes unexpected, sometimes even puzzling, Mahler moves outside the limits of photography which are generally assumed to be uncrossable. In her pictures the visible elements provide just a thin outer shell, which quickly melts away as soon as the interest of the observer in the essential content of the image is awakened. That content often comprises elements that mere language can only describe in the vaguest of terms, such as joy, love, loneliness, emptiness and high-spiritedness. Or frequently some combination of them all."

Wolfgang Kil

== Awards ==
- 1979: photokina photography prize
- 2011: arts, literature and photography prize from the Brandenburg lottery fund.

== Publications ==
- Monalisen der Vorstädte: Fotografien von Ute und Werner Mahler. Verlag Meier und Müller, Berlin 2013, ISBN 978-3-00-035371-0. (deutsch, englisch)
- Zusammenleben. Text von Sibylle Berg. Hatje Cantz, Ostfildern 2014, ISBN 978-3-7757-3822-4.
- Kleinstadt Fotografien von Ute und Werner Mahler, Hartmann Projects Verlag, Stuttgart 2018, ISBN 978-3-96070-029-6

== Exhibitions ==
- Zusammen Leben, Porträts von Arbeiterinnen in der DDR, 1984.
- Spurensuche, Galerie Ulrich Kneise, Eisenach, 2008
- Das Geheimnis bleibt, Modefotografie von Ute Mahler und Schülern, Burg Giebichenstein 2011
- Monalisen der Vorstädte- Fotografien von Ute und Wener Mahler. Galerie im Kloster, Obermarchtal 2013.
- Ute Mahler und Werner Mahler – Werkschau, Deichtorhallen, Katalog.
