= Ronald Paris =

German painter (1933–2021)

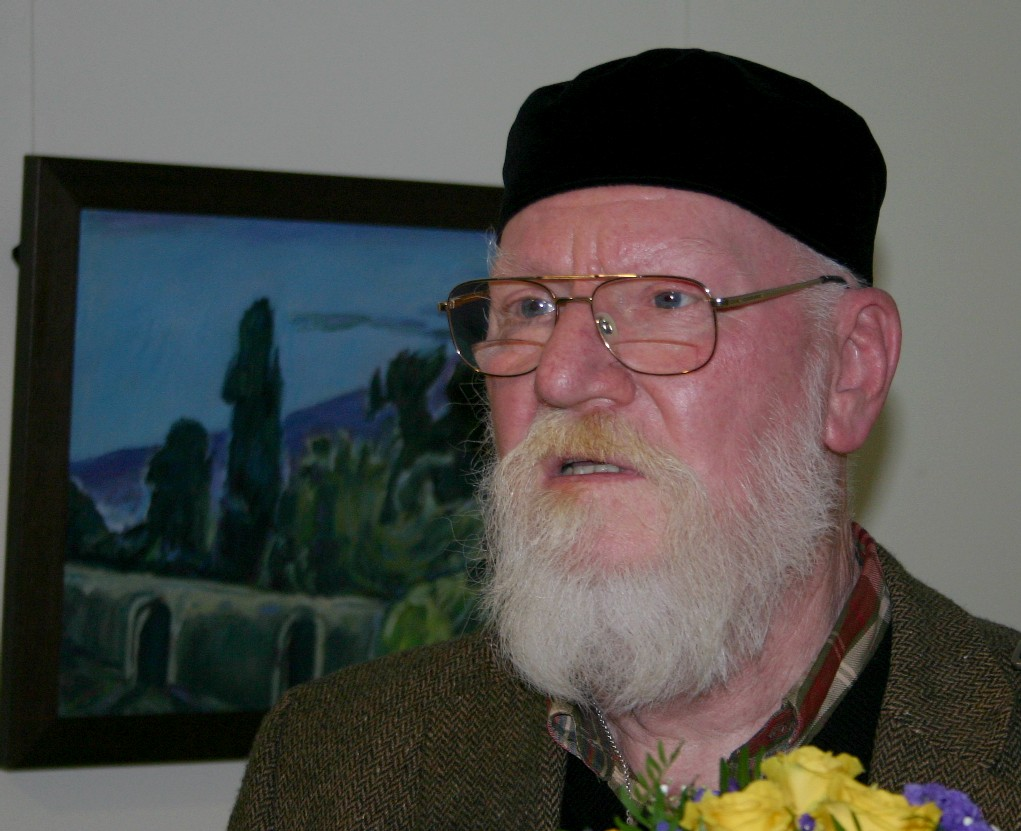
- Paris in 2012
- Born: 12 August 1933; Sondershausen, Thuringia, Germany
- Died: 17 September 2021 (aged 88)
- Occupations: Painter; Graphic artist
- Spouse(s): Helga Steffens; Isolde Hanke
- Children: 3

Ronald Paris (12 August 1933 – 17 September 2021) was a German painter and graphic artist.

== Life ==
=== Provenance and education ===
Ronald Paris was born in Sondershausen, a small town in central Germany with a long tradition as an army town. His father was a stage actor and singer: his mother was a housewife, qualified as a seamstress. As the war drew to a close, formally ending in May 1945, Paris was rescued by advancing American troops from a fire in the cellar of the school in Sondershausen. In 2004, in commemoration of this event, which involved the rescuing of many families, he produced an altar triptych for the Trinitatis Church in Sondershausen where, many years before, he had been baptized.

He left school in 1948, the year of his parents' divorce, and started an apprenticeship in nearby Weimar focused on glass art and stained glass. By this time his urge to become a painter had become firmly rooted: between 1950 and 1952 he undertook appropriate studies, starting with evening classes at the Visual Arts Academy in Weimar and moving on, in 1951, to the Workers' and Peasants' faculty at Jena where he qualified for an entitlement to attend a university. He then undertook a brief internship/traineeship at the Castle Museum in Gotha. Between 1953 and 1958 he studied Mural painting at the Visual Arts Academy at Weissensee (Berlin). Here his teachers included Kurt Robbel, Arno Mohr, Bert Heller, Gabriele Mucchi and Toni Mau.

=== Artistic and career development ===
In 1959 he embarked on a career as a freelance artist. In the same year he undertook a 3,000 km (1,800 mile) study tour to the Soviet Union, which took him to the Volga and back. In 1961 he joined the National Association of Visual Artists, which was for many purposes a prerequisite for an artistic career in the German Democratic Republic. Much later, between 1985 and 1991 he served as the Association's regional president for the Berlin district. It was in this capacity that in 1989 he was a co-signatory of a declaration calling for the party to avoid violence during the succession of events that led, in October 1990, to German reunification.

In 1961 his triptych, "Village Games in Wartenberg" ("Dorffestspiele in Wartenberg") was savagely criticised by the leadership of East Germany's ruling Socialist Unity Party, who insisted that his presentation of workers did not correspond with official idealised presentations. In 1962 Ronald Paris drew up the prestigious poster for the Brecht drama Schweik in the Second World War. Between 1963 and 1966 he was a "master-scholar" under Otto Nagel at the Berlin Arts Academy. In 1965 Ronald Paris was a co-founder of the "Intergrafik Treinnale", later becoming the event's president.

In 1969 Paris painted the popular singer-actor Ernst Busch for a series entitled "Artists as seen by artists" ("Künstler sehen Künstler"). Two versions of the Busch portrait were produced, and the second of them was exhibited in the seventh National Art Exhibition in Dresden. The circumstances proved controversial because the "portrait" by Paris showed not Busch in a characteristically heroic pose, but as a tired old man. Ronald Paris received much criticism over the matter, not least from Ernst Busch who was furious. In the end the painting was purchased by the Ministry for Culture and was subject to a high-profile "disappearance". It is now considered "lost".

Between 1993 and 1999 Ronald Paris was a professor at the "Burg Giebichenstein" Arts Acadademy in Halle. Since 1985 he has lived and worked in Rangsdorf near Berlin.

== Family and friends ==
Between 1961 and 1974, Ronald Paris was married to the photographer Helga Paris; they had two children, Robert (1962) and Jenny Helena (1964). From 1985 he was married to Isolde Paris. Their daughter, Anna Therese, was born in 1976.

The landscape artist from Schwerin, Wilhelm Facklam, was his maternal uncle.

Close friends included the painters Ursula Wendorff-Weidt and Gabriele Mucchi, along with the singer Wolf Biermann, the graphic artist Herbert Sandberg and Ursula's husband, the expressionist dance pioneer Jean Weidt.
