= José Montalvo (choreographer) =

French dancer and choreographer

- Born: 1954 (age 71–72); Toulouse, Haute-Garonne, France
- Occupations: Dancer, dance teacher, choreographer

José Montalvo (born 1954) is a prominent French dancer and choreographer. A 2001 winner of the Laurence Olivier Award for Best Dance Production, his work has been performed in Europe, America and Asia.

== Biography ==
=== Early life ===
José Montalvo was born in 1954 in Toulouse, Haute-Garonne, France. He is of Spanish descent, as his parents moved to France during the Spanish Civil War. He took dance lessons at the Toulouse National Dance Centre as a child. At the age of twenty, he moved to Paris to study Art History and Visual Arts, where he intended to become an architect. He then studied Dance with American choreographer Jerome Andrews. He went on to study Dance with Dominique Dupuy (fr) and Françoise Dupuy, when he learnt "expressionist" dance, pioneered by Jean Weidt. Later, he was trained by Carolyn Carlson, Lucinda Childs, Alwin Nikolaïs and Merce Cunningham.

=== Career ===
He started his career as a dancer at Les Ballets Modernes de Paris. He later transitioned as a dance teacher. In the late 1980s, he began working as a choreographer. One of his main dancers was Dominique Hervieu. He won several prizes, including one in Nyon in 1986, in Paris in 1987, and in Cagliari in 1988.

In 1988, together with Dominique Hervieu, he founded the Montalvo-Hervieu Company. The following year, in 1989, he helped organise dances with Les Danses à Voir et à Danser, a dance festival. In 1993, he organised the summer festival at the Théâtre national de Chaillot. Later that year, he made a videographic art piece called Double Trouble with Michel Coste, mixing choreography and technology. In 1997, he created Paradis, a highly successful dance performance which was performed in Europe, South America and Asia at an average of four times a week.

In 1998, together with Dominique Hervieu, he became the co-director of the Créteil and Val-de-Marne National Dance Centre. Two years later, he was appointed as the Dance Director of the Théâtre National de Chaillot.

He became a Laurence Olivier Award winner in 2001, when he was awarded the Laurence Olivier Award for Best Dance Production for Le Jardin Io Io Ito Ito, together with Dominique Hervieu. They also received the Choreography Prize from the Société des Auteurs et Compositeurs Dramatiques in 2005. According to a 1999 article from The New York Times, he is known for mixing "African, Caribbean and break dancing to contemporary, hip-hop and classical styles" and hiring "multicultural" dancers, giving way to what he calls a poetry of juxtapositions.

He is the artist-in-residence at the Théâtre National de Chaillot in Paris. For example, in 2012-2013, he choreographed Don Quichotte du Trocadéro at Chaillot.

At the end of the Bastille Day military parade on July 14, 2014, to commemorate the centennial of the First World War, he was commissioned by the French government a choreographic performance with 250 young dancers from the eighty countries who fought in the war on the Place de la Concorde. The eight-minute performance to a clarinet concerto by Mozart included echoes to La Sardane de la paix and La Colombe, two paintings by Pablo Picasso, as well as Les Oiseaux by Georges Braque. The dancers let doves fly away at the end of the performance, a symbol of peace through strength after the military parade.

== Dances ==
- Hollaka Hollala
- Pilhaou Thibaou
- La Mitrailleuse en Etat de Grace
- Paradis
- Le Jardin Io Io Ito Ito
- Le Rire de la Lyre
- Don Quichotte du Trocadéro
