= Karin Waehner =

German-born French dancer and choreographer

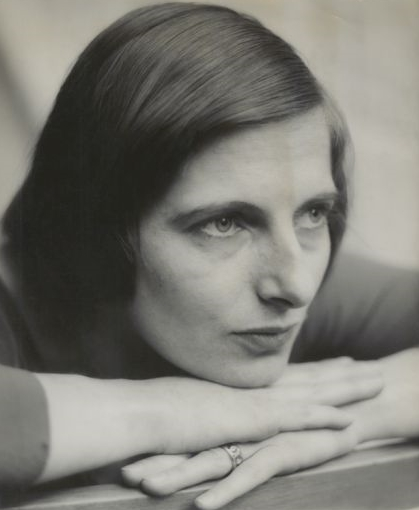
Karin Waehner (c. 1963)

Karin Waehner (birth name Ruth Karin Margarete Wähner, 1926–1999) was a German-born dancer and choreographer who is remembered for bringing modern dance to France after settling in Paris in the early 1950s. Initially a pupil of Mary Wigman in Leipzig, she received further training in Paris from choreographers including Boris Knyazev and Jacqueline Robinson (dancer). After acquiring French nationality in 1958, she founded her own company, Les ballets contemporains Karin Waehner. She taught at the Schola Cantorum de Paris from 1960. In 1982, she ran a modern dance course in La Rochelle, the first in any French conservatory. She is remembered as an outstanding instructor, training dancers from France and abroad.

== Early life and education ==
Ruth Karin Margarete Wähner was born in Gleiwitz, Germany, (now Gliwice, Poland) on 12 March 1926. In 1945, she moved to Dresden with her mother, who was also a dancer and dance teacher. After training as a gymnast at the Menzler-Marsmann Schule in the Hellerau district of the city (1945–46), she studied modern dance under Mary Wigman in Leipzig, receiving her diploma in education and choreography from Wigman in 1949.

== Career ==
On graduating, she was engaged for a year with her mother at the Theater in Giessen. For financial reasons, they then joined her brother in Buenos Aires, Argentina, where she spent two years dancing and teaching at Otto Weberg's dance school.

Waehner then returned to Europe and settled in Paris where she worked together with dancers including Jerome Andrews, Jacqueline Robinson and Dominique Dupuy. After acquiring French nationality, in 1959 she founded her own group, Les ballets contemporains Karin Waehner, while also training teachers of gymnastics at the École supérieure d'éducation physique. From 1960, she taught at the Schola Cantorum, which on her initiative was expanded to include a department of modern dance. She later became the school's director. From 1978, she taught a modern dance course at the Ècole de musique et danse at Bagnolet and in 1982, moved to La Rochelle where she ran the first contemporary dance course in any French conservatory. In addition, together with Jacques Garros and Jean Masse, each summer for the remainder of her life, Waehner ran summer courses in modern dance at the Centre Lafaurie Montadon in Castillon-de-Castets, Gironde.

Karin Waehner died in Paris on 10 February 1999. She was a modern dance teacher whose students included several dancers who later achieved national and international recognition.

== See also ==
- List of dancers
