= Kristián Mensa =

Czech actor, dancer and illustrator

Mr. Kriss
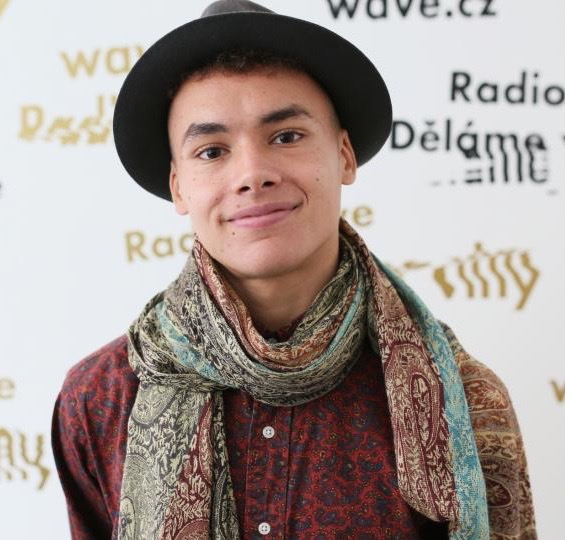
- Born: Kristián Mensa; October 21, 1997 (age 28); Prague, Czech Republic
- Occupations: Dancer, illustrator, actor
- Years active: 2015 - present
- Career
- Current group: Opatow Flavours
- Website: www.mrkriss.com

Kristián Mensa (born 21 October 1997), better known by his stage name Mr. Kriss, is a Czech actor, dancer and illustrator based in Prague, Czech Republic. He is the winner of 2019 Red Bull Dance Your Style - Czech Republic. He was also listed on the Huffington Post's 20 Under 20 list of gifted young innovators of 2018, as well as The World's Smartest Teens in 2018. In 2021, he received the Silver Medal of the President of the Senate of the Czech Republic for "youthful courage and inspiration". Mensa's art work has been reviewed by prominent news agencies around the world including Bored Panda, Designboom, Metro, BuzzFeed, etc.

== Early life and education ==
Mensa was born in 1997, in Prague, Czech Republic, in a family with African ancestry. His grandfather was from Kumasi, Ghana. He received his primary education from ZŠ s RVJ K Milíčovu, an elementary school in Prague. He attended Gymnázium Na Vítězné pláni, Prague from 2011 to 2018 where he completed his secondary education. In 2015, Mensa attended Arvada High School in Colorado, USA as an exchange student. From 2018 to 2019, Mensa attended University of Europe for Applied Sciences in Berlin and joined Vysoká škola kreativní komunikace (VŠKK) in the late 2019 where he studied Visual Effects and Animation.

== Career ==
=== Illustration ===
Mensa started his professional artistic career in 2015 with his solo exhibition, Brewed Awakenings, in Arvada, Colorado. From 2015 to 2019, he exhibited his art works throughout Europe at multiple solo and group exhibitions. Mensa is recognized for humanising architecture and layering colourful, tangible objects atop his simple drawings. His work and point of view came to the attention of Huffington Post, where he appeared in their 20 Under 20 list of gifted young innovators of 2018. Mensa was also listed in The World's Smartest Teens in 2018 by The Best Schools.

Over the years, Mensa collaborated with and created art works for renowned brands such as Heinz, Pilot, Red Bull, Adidas and WWF-UK. His art work has been featured in Bored Panda, Designboom, CCMA TV3, Metro.co.uk, DeMilked, Huffington Post, BuzzFeed, The Tax Collection, MyModernMet, Awesome Inventions, Courrier International, Art Sheep, AfroPunk, Red Bull and Arch Daily.

=== Dance career ===
At the age of 16, in 2014, Mensa participated in King Of The Kidz World Finals in Amsterdam where he finished in top 16. In 2017, Mensa won the dance competition, Break Central Vol. III in London. Subsequently, in the late 2017, he finished at the first place at Juste Debout in Bratislava and at Mindless - Experimental Dance Battle in Luxembourg.

During Eurovision Song Contest 2018 in Lisbon, Portugal, Mensa performed alongside Mikolas Josef who represented the Czech Republic. Also in 2018, he performed at I Love This Dance in Paris, France. At the 2019 Red Bull Dance Your Style - Czech Republic, Mensa, competing as Mr. Kriss, won the first place and qualified for participation in the first-ever Red Bull Dance Your Style world finals that took a place in Paris on October 12, 2019. Earlier that year, Mensa also won Break Central Vol. V in London.

In 2020, Mensa performed alongside Kylie Minogue for her music video of the song "Magic". Prior to that, Mensa has also performed in the music videos of several prominent musicians such as Rita Ora, Skyline and Baynk.

From 2020, Mensa has been affiliated with Uppercut Dance Theater and was invited to perform at Breakin' Convention festival with his solo work Found Lost. He has also collaborated with choreographers Akram Khan and Yoann Bourgeois and worked with musician Hania Rani. He has danced commercially for brands including Louis Vuitton and Zara, and alongside artist Armand Amar.

In 2025, Mensa co-created and performed in a contemporary stage work titled OO-LI alongside Korean dancer-choreographer Haeni Kim. The 60-minute piece brings together 30 dancers to explore themes of identity, constraint and coexistence, fusing breakdance and hip-hop dance with a soundscape of neo-classical and electronic compositions by Ólafur Arnalds and Nils Frahm, alongside live ambient music. The work at the Sejong Center for the Performing Arts in Seoul, South Korea as part of the Sync Next 25 festival. Also in 2025, Mensa performed in Steps at the Smetanova Litomyšl festival, a performance pairing modern dance with classical music alongside Haeni Kim and a string quartet led by violinist Daniel Matejča.

Later that year, Mensa performed as a dancer-actor in Kirill Serebrennikov's theatrical production Hamlet / Fantômes at the Théâtre du Châtelet in Paris. He also appeared as a dancer in the "Ulysse Arctic" segment of the immersive 360° concert film and live project Cercle Odyssey, directed by Neels Castillon, which premiered in 2025 with performances in Los Angeles, Mexico and Paris.

=== Film and acting ===
Beside being an artist and a dancer, Mensa is also an actor. He appeared in 2011's Czech film, Peklo s princeznou as a child artist. He has also worked in the Czech short film, Bo Hai in 2017 and Backstage in 2018. In 2020, Mensa appeared in a movie called Who is Mr. Kriss?, directed by Adolf Zika.

His bachelor's graduation film, In Our Hands (2024), produced at VŠKK, is an animated short film fusing dance and animation to examine the relationship between the human body and the natural world. It was selected for the Grand Competition of Animafest Zagreb 2024, as well as several other international festivals including Anifilm Liberec, Animafest Athens, the Bucharest International Dance Film Festival — where it received the Special Jury Award — and the Environmental Film and Screenplay Festival 2024, where it won Best Experimental Film.

=== Public speaking ===
In November 2017, Mensa spoke at the TEDxYouth@Praha in Prague.

== Accolades ==
Year	Award	Notes
2018	Huffington Post 20 Under 20	STEAM Pioneers
2018	The Best Schools – World's Smartest Teens	—
2019	Red Bull Dance Your Style – Czech Republic	Winner
2019	Red Bull Dance Your Style World Finals (Paris)	4th place
2021	Silver Medal of the President of the Senate of the Czech Republic	"Youthful courage and inspiration"
2022	Forbes Czech 30 Under 30	—
2024	Bucharest International Dance Film Festival – Special Jury Award	For In Our Hands
2024	Environmental Film and Screenplay Festival – Best Experimental Film	For In Our Hands
