= Helga Paris =

German photographer (1938–2024)

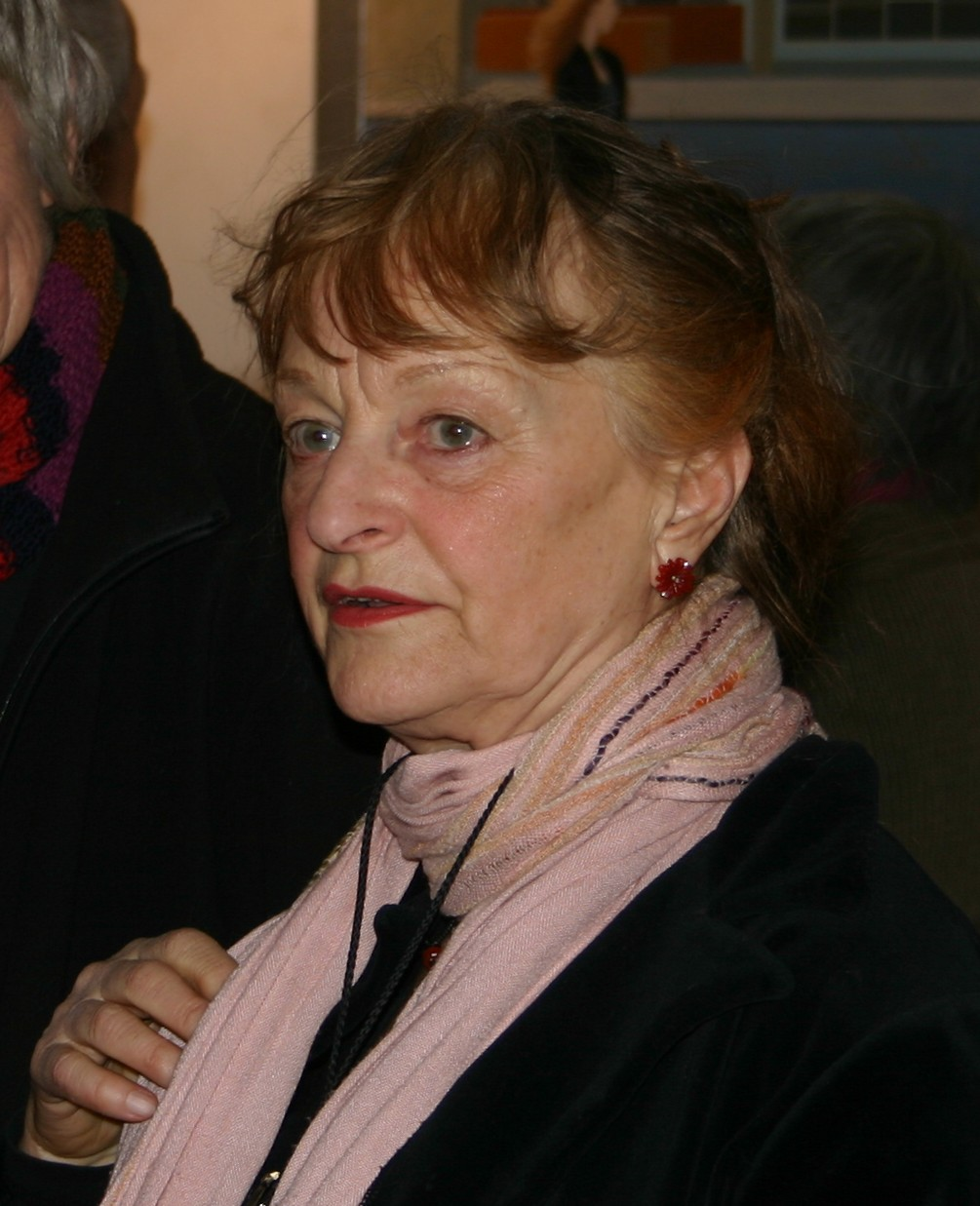
- Paris in 2012
- Born: Helga Steffens; 21 May 1938; Gollnow, Germany
- Died: 5 February 2024 (aged 85); Berlin, Germany
- Occupation: Photographer
- Spouse: Ronald Paris
- Children: 2

Helga Paris (née Steffens; 21 May 1938 – 5 February 2024) was a German photographer, known for her photographs of daily life in East Germany. She photographed theatre, and then turned to a series of people and streetscapes, such as Garbage Collectors (1974), Berliner Kneipen (1975), Leipzig Hauptbahnhof (1981), self portraits, and houses and faces from Halle for an exhibition that was cancelled -after catalogues and posters had been printed- in 1986. Her works, shown internationally, received recognition especially after German reunification as documents of a past.

== Life and career ==
Helga Steffens, daughter of Gertrud Steffens and typesetter Wilhelm Steffens, was born just over a year before the outbreak of the Second World War in Gollnow, a small town then in the north of Germany. In May 1945, she celebrated her seventh birthday, while the war ended in defeat for Germany. Her father and two brothers were still away, but in the meantime frontier changes mandated by the victorious powers and large-scale ethnic cleansing forced Helga's mother to flee with her two daughters. They ended up in Zossen, a small town a little to the south of Berlin. There she was raised by a community of mostly women, many of whom worked. She was introduced to photography by her aunts who took many photographs.

In Zossen, she completed school successfully with the Abitur in 1956. She then studied fashion design at the School of Engineering for the Clothing Industry (Ingenieurschule für Bekleidungsindustrie) in Berlin until 1960. She undertook an internship at VEB Treffmodelle. She then worked briefly as a lecturer of costume studies at a trade school, and worked as a commercial graphic designer for the DEWAG advertisement agency in Berlin. She was a costume designer at the Berliner Studenten- und Arbeitertheater, a theatre of students and workers, which introduced her to the artists' circle around Wolf Biermann. In 1960, she started to take photographs with a 6×6 Flexaret camera.

During this time she met the painter Ronald Paris; they were married from 1961 to 1974. Through her husband, she was able to establish contacts in the East German art scene of the time. She had developed a passion for photography but, like many of the leading photographers of the German Democratic Republic (GDR), was often described as self-taught. She believed that much of her photographic passion and skill were acquired from two aunts who were enthusiastic photographers, constantly taking pictures from the 1940s through the 1960s, which Paris carefully preserved in a collection of show boxes adapted for the purpose.

=== Professional work ===
Paris began taking photographs seriously around 1967. She was influenced by the work of Edvard Munch, Max Beckmann, Francis Bacon, and Werner Held. Between 1967 and 1968, she worked in the photo-laboratory of Walli Baucik. Her first free-lance job, in 1969, was to photograph slaughtering at a home in Thuringia; in 1970, she shot fashion photographs for the youth magazine neues leben. In 1972, she joined the Verband Bildender Künstler der DDR association of visual artists, which was virtually a prerequisite for success in what was now her chosen career.

In 1975, she photographed scenes from theatre productions by Benno Besson at the Berlin Volksbühne and by Alexander Lang and Friedo Solter at the Deutsches Theater. She presented her first personal exhibition in 1978 at the Dresden Academy of Fine Arts.

Her work was focused increasingly on people and streetscapes, initially in Berlin where many of her subjects were neighbours and friends. She documented social conditions in several series: Müllfahrer (Garbage collectors, 1974), Berliner Kneipen (Berlin bars, 1975), Möbelträger (Movers, 1975), Altersheim (Senior citizens' home, 1980), Berliner Jugendliche (Berlin youths) and Leipzig Hauptbahnhof (Leipzig main station, both 1981/82). She took photographs of Zossen where she had grown up, titled Erinnerungwn an Z. (Memories of Z.), self portraits from 1981, in 1984 portraits of women working at VEB Treffmodelle, She photographed people in Georgia, Poland and Transylvania, for example young men around the Rome main station. She photographed houses and faces from Halle from 1983 to 1985, with the approach to document everything like a foreign town in a foreign country (wie eine fremde Stadt in einem fremden Land). In Halle, she encountered greater difficulty than in Berlin because the people she photographed were strangers who sometimes reacted with hostility. She then took time to talk to people and ask before photographing them, making them more open to being photographed but still reluctantly, when the streets in the background showed that the city centre looked badly damaged because it was undergoing major and slow redevelopment. Her 1986 exhibition Houses and Faces. Halle 1983–1985, planned for the city's Marktschlößchen gallery, was cancelled a few days before the scheduled opening because her pictures gave publicity to the city's misguided building policy. By the time it was cancelled, a catalogue and exhibition labels for the photographs had already been printed.

Her career as a free-lance photographer survived German reunification, and for some commentators her photographs from the East German period gained a wider interest once the period they depicted had become history. In 2003, her twelve-part exhibition Self images 1981–1988 in the context of the Art in the German Democratic Republic exhibition drew much interest. From 1996, Paris was a member of the Berlin Academy of Arts. She left her archive of around 230,000 negatives and 6,300 films to the institution.

=== Personal life ===
Paris and her husband lived in the Prenzlauer Berg quarter of Berlin from 1966. They had two children.

Paris died at her Berlin apartment on 5 February 2024, at the age of 85.

== Grants and prizes ==
- 1992, 1994, 1996 Stiftung Kulturfonds, stipends and grant
- 1993 Grant from the Berlin Senate Administration for Science and Culture (Berliner Senatsverwaltung für Wissenschaft und Kultur)
- 2004 Hannah-Höch-Preis
- 2019 Culture Prize of the DGPH (German Society of Photography)

== Catalogues ==
- Diva in Grau. Häuser und Gesichter in Halle. Mitteldeutscher Verlag, Halle 2000. New revised edition: 2006, ISBN 978-3-89812-361-7.
- Inka Schube (ed.): Helga Paris: Fotografien. texts by Jean Francois Chevier, Elke Erb, Helmut Brade, Helga Paris, Inka Schube. Holzwarth, Berlin 2004, ISBN 978-3-935567-19-0. (exhibition catalague, 318 p.).
- Hannah-Höch-Preis 2004: Helga Paris. Fotografien 1967–1996. Berlinische Galerie, Berlin 2004, ISBN 978-3-927873-89-6. (exhibition catalague, 31 p.).
- Agneta Maria Jilek: Metaphorik des Urbanen. Die Fotoserie Häuser und Gesichter Halle 1983–1985 von Helga Paris. In: Franziska Eißner, Michael Scholz-Hänsel (eds.): Armut in der Kunst der Moderne. Jonas Verlag, Marburg 2011, ISBN 978-3-89445-448-7.
- Elke aus dem Moore (ed.): Helga Paris, Fotografie. ifa, Institut für Auslandsbeziehungen. Texts around Helga Paris. Hatje Cantz, Ostfildern 2012, ISBN 978-3-7757-3490-5.
- Leipzig Hauptbahnhof 1981/ 82. Spector Books, Leipzig 2020, ISBN 978-3-95905-324-2.
- Künstlerportraits. Spector Books, Leipzig 2021, ISBN 978-3-95905-513-0.
