= José Montalvo =

José Montalvo may refer to:

- José Montalvo (writer), Chicano writer, poet, and community activist.
- José Montalvo (footballer), Spanish former footballer
- José Montalvo (choreographer), French dancer and choreographer
