= Michael Weidt =

German photographer (born 1946)

- Born: 22 February 1946 (age 80); Berlin-Moabit, Soviet occupation zone in Germany
- Occupations: Photographer especially of photo-portraits
- Known for: Failed attempt to escape over the Berlin Wall
- Spouse(s): 1. ______; 2. ______; 3. ______
- Parent(s): Ursula Wendorff-Weidt (1919-2000); Jean Weidt (1904-1988 - stepfather)

Michael Weidt (born 22 February 1946) is a German photographer. He is known, in particular, for his portraits of East German theatre and movie stars. His repertoire has also covered the worlds of music, dance and the visual arts more generally.

Weidt grew up in the German Democratic Republic (East Germany). Early in 1964, aged just 18, he attempted an escape to West Berlin in order to be reunited with his grandmother who had brought him up during his early childhood, and whom he badly missed. The escape attempt failed, but Weidt survived.

== Life ==
=== Family provenance ===
Weidt comes from an artistic family. His mother, Ursula Wendorff-Weidt (1919-2000) was an artist-illustrator. His step father was the dancer-choreographer Jean Weidt (1904-1988). The ceramicist Andreas Weidt is his half brother.

=== Eventful beginnings ===
Michael Weidt was born at his grandmother's home into the chaotic winter aftermath of war at Berlin-Moabit, a district on the western side of inner Berlin. A midwife attended the birth, but it was his grandmother who spotted that his umbilical cord had not been properly cut and secured; it was his uncle who rushed the infant to the local hospital. The baby barely survived the loss of blood. For the first six years of Weidt's life his grandmother undertook much of the necessary childcare, while during the daytime his mother studied painting and graphic arts at the Weißensee Arts Academy. Of his relationship with his mother, he recalled that she was "a very enchanting woman ... not at all like a mother, more like a friend..." His mother married the choreographer Jean Weidt when he was 6 and he was taken with his parents to live in Schwerin in the northern part of what had become, in October 1949, the German Democratic Republic (East Germany). His stepfather worked as the Ballet master in Schwerin between 1952 and 1955. The rest of Michael Weidt's childhood and adolescence were in several important ways defined by enduring unhappiness over the separation from his grandmother who had looked after him during the crucial early years.

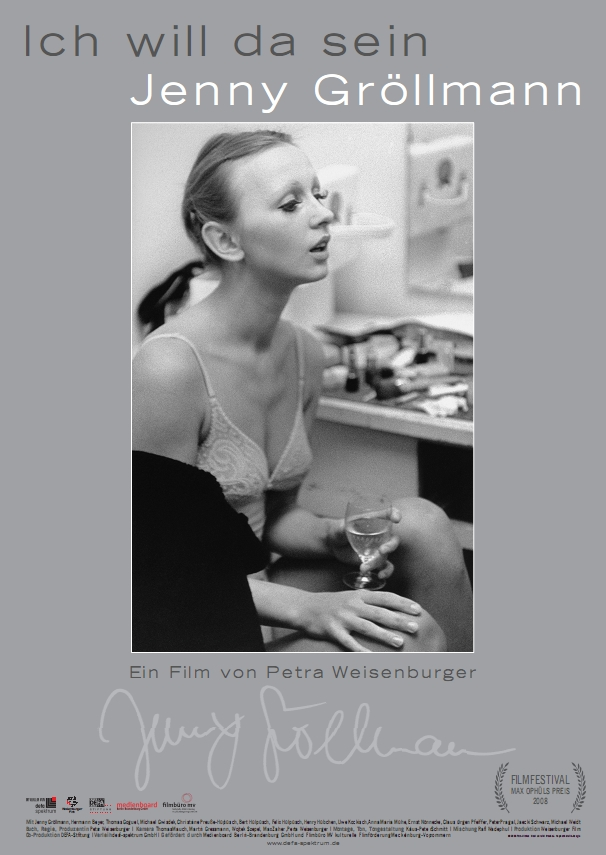
Jenny Gröllmann: photographed by Michael Weidt in her dressing room at the Maxim Gorki Theater in 1975

It was during the early 1950s in Schwerin that Weidt got to know the actress Jenny Gröllmann (1947-2006), who became a lifelong friend. Between 1955 and 1958 Weidt lived with his parents in Karl-Marx-Stadt (as Chemnitz was called at that time), after which the family returned to the Berlin area, now living in Rangsdorf, directly to the south of the city. Michael Weidt, aged 12 in 1958, found himself living only about 25 km (15 miles) away from his grandmother whom he visited regularly. Nevertheless, he was in East Germany and his grandmother was in West Berlin; in August 1961, concerned by the continuing diminution through emigration of the working age population, the East German government constructed the Berlin Wall. The visits stopped.

=== Escape plan ===
In 1964, shortly before they were due to take their school final exams, Michael Weidt and a friend decided to try and climb over the wall into West Berlin, in order that Michael might be reunited with his grandmother, and the friend with his father who worked as a publisher in the west. The attempt failed and the two narrowly avoided being shot by border guards as they crossed the open ground between the "inner wall" and what they believed to be the "outer wall". One of the border guards informed them that if they had waited a couple of hours, the guards would have been asleep and the boys would have made it to the other side. They were treated unsympathetically by the guards who placed them in separate corners and held a gun pointed in the face of each during interrogation. Their jail terms, each lasting three months, were followed by a longer period "out on probation".

=== The unofficial student ===
Between 1965 and 1967 Weidt undertook a two-year stint as a "guest student" of Arno Fischer who was teaching at the Weißensee Arts Academy. He could not be accepted as a full-time student because no sponsoring organisation could be found to send him. He had never sat for his school final exams; details of the education he received from Fischer remain unclear. Weidt himself recalls:

"I am simply very happy that I got to know him, and he set me on my way, although initially I did not realise it. He gave me a camera and sent me to the bus stop. There were people there ... I like that, if something happens. And if nothing happens, if someone has a funny walk or something. For me it is always great, when people are in the picture, even if they're very small. Sometimes you have to search". (Note: "Ich bin sehr glücklich darüber, dass ich ihn kennengelernt habe und er mich auf den Weg gebracht hat, obwohl ich erst nichts begriffen habe. Er hat mir ‘ne Kamera gegeben und mich an die Bushaltestelle geschickt. Da sind Menschen. Menschen hab‘ ich immer drin. Ich mag das, wenn was passiert. Auch wenn nichts passiert, wenn jemand bloß läuft oder so. Es ist mir immer ganz wohl, wenn Leute drauf sind, auch wenn sie ganz klein sind. Manchmal muss man auch suchen.")

A student contemporary was Sibylle Bergemann (who later married Fischer). Weidt published his first professional photograph in 1967; it was a panorama shot of the Karl-Marx-Allee in East Berlin, published as a double-page spread in "Das Magazin".

=== The professional ===
In 1968 he embarked on a full-time career as a freelance photographer in East Berlin. He received work from the East German fashion magazines, "Sibylle", published in East Berlin and Leipzig based "Praktische Mode". Later, in an interview, he cheerfully explained; "Photographing the women was huge fun. The fashion never interested me". (Note: "„Die Frauen zu fotografieren, das hat unheimlich Spaß gemacht. Die Mode hat mich nie interessiert.")

He quickly became a member of the so-called "Direkt" group of freelance photographers. Others included his old teacher, Arno Fischer and Sibylle Bergemann, along with Roger Melis and Brigitte Voigt. He was soon getting fashion photography assignments from other publications such as Neue Berliner Illustrierte, and more work from "Das Magazin".

In 1978 Weidt had his first exhibition at Berlin's "Kunst in Heim" gallery. From 1978 he was working with a Nikon FM 35 mm camera, fitted with an "Objektiv" 35 mm or 85 mm lens.

In 1989 and 1990 Weidt undertook two "semi-secret" photo-trips to Paris, from which his exhibition "Pictures of Paris" ("Pariser Bilder") resulted, though he has not yet fulfilled an ambition to published a collected volume featuring those Paris images. His favourite photograph, featuring the single small figure on one end of the picture of a woman, walking urgently beside a simple fence in the Montmartre quarter of Paris, was first published in 1990 and dates from one of these Paris trips, though he himself describes it as "timeless". (Note: "...ein super Foto – für mich. Ich weiß nicht, ob‘s andern gefällt. Das muss es gar nicht, es ist erst mal für mich. Weil es so zeitlos kommt.")

=== Family division ===
By the time his photography career took off, Weidt was living in Berlin, but he was living in East Berlin. For more than eight years after the failure of his attempt to cross the Berlin Wall, accessing West Berlin from East Germany was for most citizens not officially possible, and West Berliners, similarly, were not able to visit the east. There was a scheme in operation for the most deserving East German political prisoners to have their freedom purchased by the West German government, but through the 1960s this scheme's existence was unacknowledged, and it was in any case not designed to accommodate the needs of a photographer from East Berlin who simply wished to see his grandmother in West Berlin. The position changed following a slight political thaw in relations between the two German states. In October 1972 a new so-called "Verkehrsvertrag" (literally "Traffic agreement") between the East and West German governments came into force. The agreement included various provisions to reduce the trade restrictions. On the travel rights of individual citizens, there was no change in the rules governing the rights of East Germans to visit the west, but West Berliners now acquired the chance to undertake one day visits to relatives in the east.

=== Family reunited ===
After 1972 Weidt and his grandmother resumed contact when she began to visit him in East Berlin, crossing at the Friedrichstrasse crossing point, known colloquially as the Palace of Tears ("Tränenpalast") on account of tears shed there at the end of day visits when western visitors parted from their eastern relatives. His grandmother made herself a special bag in which she used to smuggle Rolling Stones and Beatles albums not officially available in the German Democratic Republic. Weidt enjoyed the kudos among his comrades that comes from having a grandmother who smuggles banned music across the frontier. The albums always arrived undamaged.

During the later 1980s there was further relaxation in the tensions between the two Germanies, and Weidt wrote to the authorities begging to be allowed to cross the wall and visit his grandmother for her ninetieth birthday, since she had no other relatives to look after her. Permission was granted on condition that he told no one and in the end he was able to stay with his grandmother for three days on the occasion of her ninetieth birthday. Following a succession of further begging letters to the authorities, he was eventually permitted to visit his grandmother on several subsequent occasions, on at least one occasion remaining with her in West Berlin for ten or more days.

When, in November 1989, protesters broke through the Berlin wall Weidt was in West Berlin already, visiting his grandmother. With a suddenness that many found incomprehensible at the time, East Berliners were free to cross into West Berlin without having to battle for official permission. Having watched the television and explained to his grandmother that with effect from the next Monday he would be free to visit her at any time, Michael Weidt climbed into his car and became one of the first East Berliners to drive across the border from west to east, as bemused East Berliners crowded at the abandoned "Invalidenplatz" frontier post, soon to walk across cautiously in the other direction. He arrived home in Rangsdorf to tell his wife that the border was open. Pausing only to collect her papers his wife demanded the car keys and headed out of the house; Weidt never saw her again.

He sat down in front of the television only to see a recording of himself in his car, pausing at the abandoned frontier buildings as he wondered what to do, and then accelerating on across as the western television company's bus passed by in the other direction.

=== Political reunification ===
The process of reunification has unfolded progressively, but is crystallised in the Reunification Treaty, signed on 12 September 1990, which set the date for formal reunification at 3 October 1990. Weidt continued to work as a freelance photographer, but was also increasingly active as an assistant movie producer, working on films such as Das Mambospiel (1997) by Michael Gwisdek, The Crossing (1999) by Nora Hoppe, Schussangst (2002) by Dito Tsintsadze, The Red Coloured Grey (2003) by Srdjan Koljevic, Jam Session (2004) by Izabela Plucinska, Erinnere Dich, wenn du kannst! (2004) by Sigi Rothemund and La Fine del Mare (2005), again directed by Nora Hoppe. Since the turn of the century he has also participated as an eye witness in two documentary films covering his life in the German Democratic Republic (1949-1989); with his friend, Ich will da sein – Jenny Gröllmann (2008) and, after her death, Ich wollte nur meine Großmutter besuchen – Ein Porträt über Michael Weidt und die DDR (2010), produced by Ingo Woelke.

A major exhibition of Weidt's photographs took place in Saarbrücken in January 2011. More recently, there was an exhibition entitled "Erzähl mir, Augenblick" (loosely: "explain to me in an instant") at the new gallery in Wünsdorf (a short distance to the south of his Rangsdorf home-base) in March/April 2016. The Wünsdorf exhibition, which was an intensely personal one, included pictures taken on his visits to Havana in 2010 and 2011.

== Personal life ==
Michael Weidt's three marriages all ended in divorce. (He insists that divorce was a relatively painless process in the German Democratic Republic.) He currently (2016) lives with his partner, the documentary film-maker Petra Weisenburger, in the Pankow district of Berlin.
