= César Geoffray =

French composer

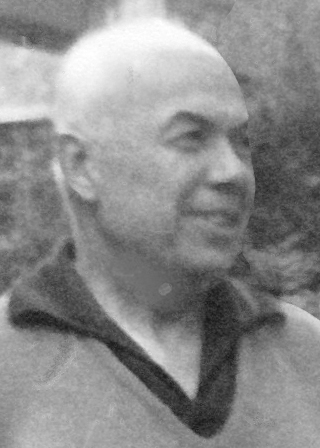
image of César Geoffray

César Geoffray (20 February 1901 – 24 December 1972) was a French composer, choral director, and music educator.

Geoffray was born in Lyon, and began his career as a child musician in the circus, then as a conductor in a theatre during the silent film era. He was inspired by meeting composer Florent Schmitt and painter Albert Gleizes early in life. He founded the choral movement known as A Coeur Joie. His students included choreographer Hélène Carlut and dancer Françoise Dupuy.
