= Dominique Dupuy =

Dominique Dupuy may refer to:

- Dominique Dupuy (racing driver) (born 1957), French racing driver
- Dominique Dupuy (biologist) (1812–1885), French botanist and malacologist
- Dominique Dupuy (dancer) (1930–2024), French dancer and choreographer of modern dance
- Dominique Martin Dupuy (1767–1798), French revolutionary leader
- Dominique Dupuy (politician) (born 1990), Haitian politician
