= Vaughan Tomlinson =

South African cartoonist and illustrator

- Born: South Africa
- Occupations: Cartoonist; Illustrator
- Years active: 2010s–present
- Known for: Oddly Enough; single-panel magazine cartoons

Vaughan Tomlinson is a South African cartoonist and illustrator based in New York City. He is best known for his single-panel observational comics and for creating Oddly Enough, a weekly comic strip syndicated by Comics Kingdom since 2025. His work has appeared in publications including The Guardian, Private Eye, Reader's Digest, The Wall Street Journal, The Times, The Oldie, and Airmail.

== Life and career ==
Tomlinson was born in South Africa to a British family. His multicultural upbringing, spanning life across multiple continents, has been cited as a formative influence on the international perspective that characterises his work. He later relocated to New York City, where he has been based as a working cartoonist.

Tomlinson did not pursue cartooning as a primary career immediately. He has described his path into the field as gradual, beginning as an occasional creative outlet before becoming more focused during the COVID-19 pandemic, after which he developed a consistent working rhythm of submitting batches of cartoons to publications each week.

His cartooning style is rooted in the tradition of single-panel cartoons, comparable to those published in The New Yorker, in which each idea must stand independently without additional panels to elaborate the joke. Tomlinson has described his creative process as observational—drawing on small, often-overlooked moments of everyday life encountered in public spaces. He is known for blending British dark humour—dry, irreverent, and ironic—with observations from contemporary urban life. His cartoons frequently feature robots, animals, insects, and aliens as subjects.

He is a member of the National Cartoonists Society.

== Magazine cartooning ==
Tomlinson established his reputation primarily as a magazine cartoonist. His single-panel cartoons have been published in a wide range of international print outlets, including The Guardian, Reader's Digest, Airmail, Alta, Private Eye, The Oldie, The Wall Street Journal, The Times, Funny Times, and Weekly Humorist.

His work attracted growing online attention through his Instagram account, where his following grew from tens of thousands of fans in the early 2020s to nearly 100,000 by the mid-2020s. His cartoons have been aggregated and featured across several popular internet culture platforms, including Bored Panda and Sad and Useless.

== Oddly Enough ==
In March 2025, Tomlinson launched Oddly Enough, a weekly single-panel comic strip, through Comics Kingdom, the comics syndication platform operated by King Features Syndicate. The strip takes an observational approach to everyday life, described by Comics Kingdom as "blending sharp satire with whimsical surrealism". The panel does not rely on conventional punchline structures; instead, according to Tomlinson, the humour emerges from a subtle shift in perspective or an observation the reader might otherwise have missed.

The strip was profiled by The Daily Cartoonist in April 2026, which noted that Tomlinson had completed one full year of contributions to Comics Kingdom and described him as a "magazine cartoonist" in the tradition of single-panel gag cartooning. Reader responses to Oddly Enough have included reinterpretations and extensions of the cartoons' jokes, a feedback loop that Tomlinson has acknowledged as part of his creative process.

== Style and influences ==
Tomlinson's work is characterised by quietness of setup and lateness of turn. Critics and commentators have noted that his cartoons do not pursue loud or complex premises, instead relying on careful attention to mundane detail. His British heritage is widely cited as foundational to the dry, self-deprecating register of his humour, while his experience of living in South Africa, New York, and across multiple countries has contributed to a broadly international sensibility.
