= Jan Saudek =

Czech photographer

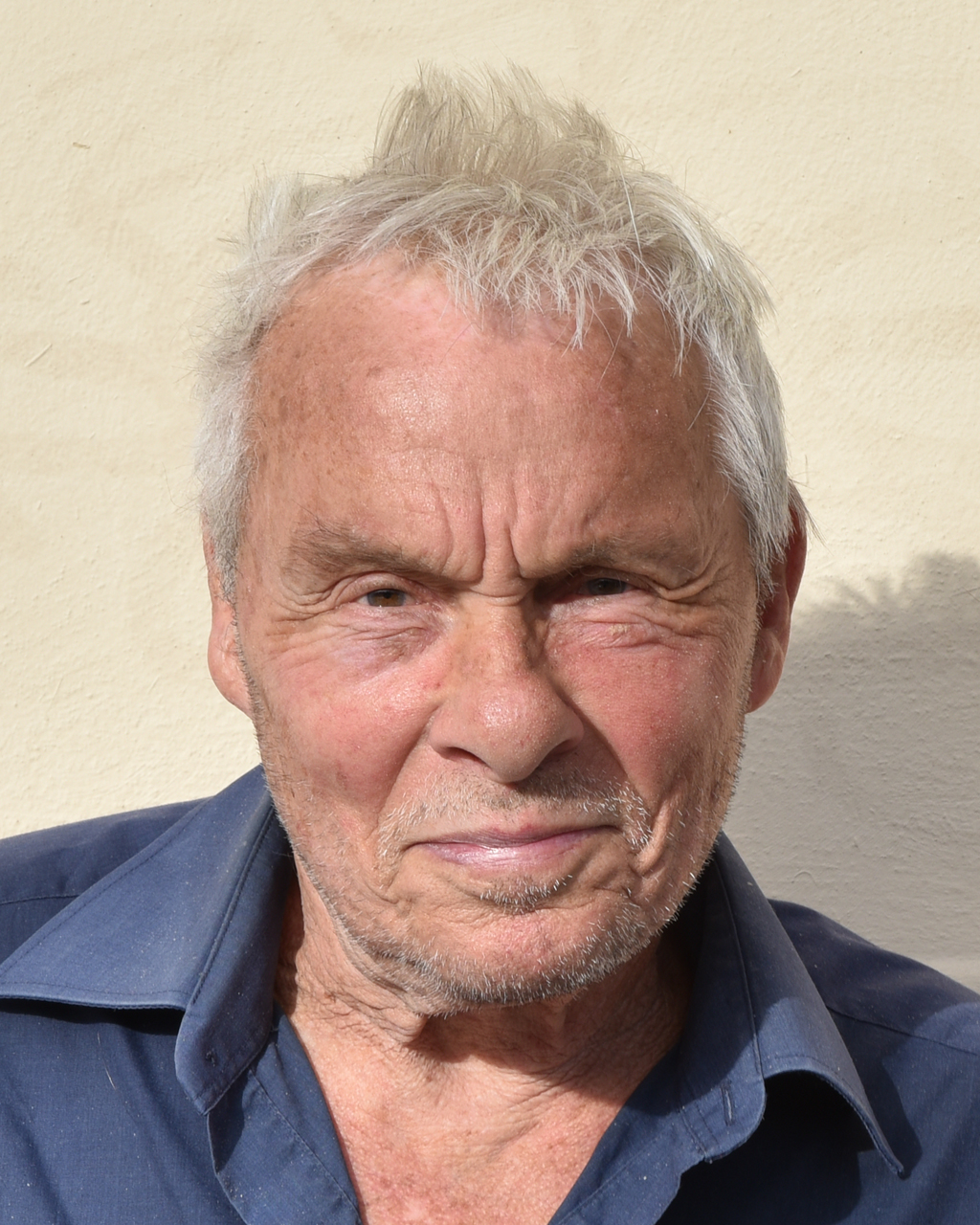
- Jan Saudek (2024)
- Born: 13 May 1935 (age 91); Prague, Czechoslovakia
- Occupations: Art photographer, painter
- Notable work: The World of Jan Saudek: Photographs, Jan Saudek-Il teatro de la vita, Story from, Czechoslovakia, My Country, and Photographs by Jan Saudek

Jan Saudek (born 13 May 1935) is an art photographer and painter.

== Life ==
Saudek and his twin brother Karel (also known as Kája) were born to a Slavic (Czech) mother and Jewish father in Prague in 1935. Their mother's family came to Prague from Bohemia, and their father from the city of Děčín in the northwest part of that area. During World War II and after the invasion of the German Nazis, both sides of his family were racially persecuted by the invaders. Many of his Jewish relatives died in Theresienstadt concentration camp during the war. Their father Gustav was deported to Theresienstadt concentration camp in February 1945. Although their mother and many other relatives died, both sons and father survived the war. A Communist-dominated government gained power after the war to rule the country, enforced by the Soviet Union and considered to be behind the Iron Curtain.

According to Saudek's biography, he acquired his first camera, a Kodak Baby Brownie, in 1950. He apprenticed to a photographer, and in 1952 started working in a print shop; he was restricted to this work by the Communist government until 1983. In 1959, he started using the more advanced Flexaret 6x6 camera, and also engaged in painting and drawing. After completing his military service, he was inspired in 1963 by the catalogue for American photographer Edward Steichen's The Family of Man exhibition, and began to work to become a serious art photographer. In 1969, Saudek traveled to the United States, where he was encouraged in his work by curator Hugh Edwards of the Art Institute of Chicago.

Returning to Prague, Saudek had to work at his photography clandestinely in a cellar, to avoid the attentions of the secret police. With his work turning to themes of personal erotic freedom, he used implicitly political symbols of corruption and innocence. From the late 1970s, he became recognized in the West as the leading Czech photographer, and also developed a following among photographers in his own country. In 1983, the first book of Saudek's work was published in the English-speaking world. The same year, he became a freelance photographer; the Czech Communist authorities allowed him to stop working in the print shop, and gave him permission to apply for a permit to work as an artist. In 1987, the archives of his negatives were seized by the police, but later returned.

During the 2000s Saudek lost all his photo negatives in a dispute with a former partner. The pictures were managed and displayed by Saudek.com, his son’s company, against Jan’s will. In 2012 High Court in Prague invalidated contracts between Jan and Saudek.com, effectively returning control over the works to the artist.

Saudek lives and works in Prague. His brother Kája Saudek was also an artist, the best-known Czech graphic novelist.

== Work ==
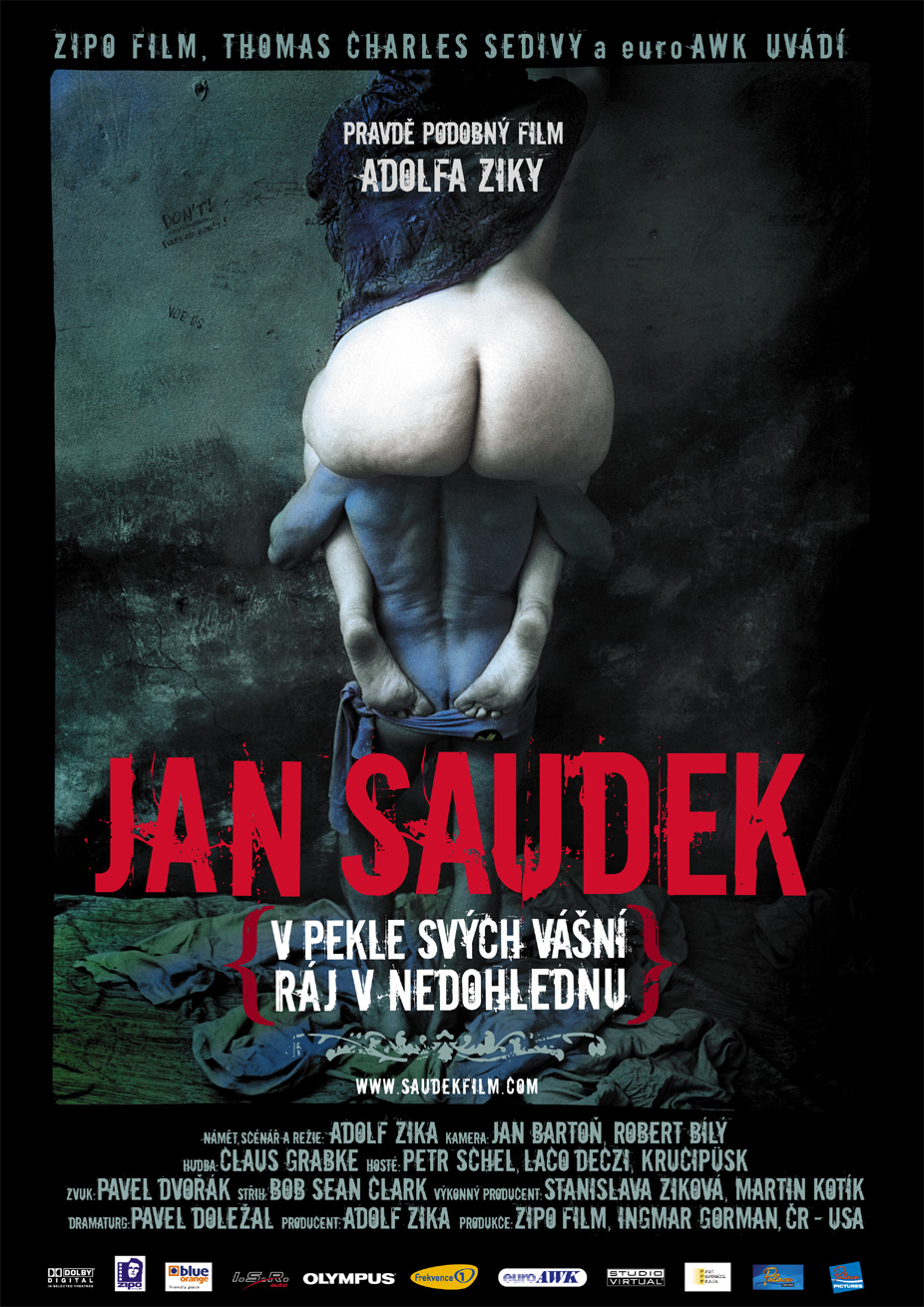
Poster for a film by Adolf Zika: Jan Saudek: Bound by Passion (2008).

His best-known work is notable for its hand-tinted portrayal of painterly dream worlds, often inhabited by nude or semi-nude figures surrounded by bare plaster walls or painted backdrops. He frequently re-uses elements (for instance, a clouded sky or a view of Prague's Charles Bridge). In this his photographs suggest the studio and tableaux works of mid-19th century erotic photographers, as well as the works of the 20th-century painter Balthus, and of Bernard Faucon.

Saudek's early art photography is noted for its evocation of childhood. His later works often portrayed the evolution from child to adult (re-photographing the same composition/pose, and with the same subjects, over many years). Religious motifs and the ambiguity between man and woman have also been some of Saudek's recurring themes. During the 1990s, his work at times generated censorship attempts in the West because of its provocative sexual content.

Saudek's imagery has sometimes had a mixed reception internationally. He gained early shows in 1969 and 1970 in the United States. In Australia, in June–July 1977 his work was welcomed by curator Jennie Boddington at the National Gallery of Victoria, who sent the show to the Australian Centre for Photography in August, in the Centre's third year. Both shows were accompanied by the same exhibition of four young Australian photographers. Jan Saudek: Story from Czechoslovakia, My Country, then appeared again in Melbourne at Church Street Photographic Centre in December and was reviewed favourably by women's activist Beatrice Faust. Shepparton Civic Centre showed Photographic images 1956-1981 by Jan Saudek in June–July 1982, followed by Benalla Art Gallery in September 1982. Decades later, by contrast, his photograph Black Sheep & White Crow, which features a semi-naked pre-pubescent girl, was removed from the Ballarat International Foto Biennale in Victoria, Australia just before the opening on 21 August 2011; objections had been made related to allegations of child prostitution for his subject.

Saudek's photographs have been featured as covers for the albums of Anorexia Nervosa (New Obscurantis Order), Soul Asylum (Grave Dancers Union), Daniel Lanois (For the Beauty of Wynona), Rorschach (Remain Sedate), and Beautiful South (Welcome to the Beautiful South).

== Publications ==
- Jan Saudek-Photo, and Jiri Masin Milos Macourek, House of Lords of Kunštát, Brno, Czech Republic, 1970.
- The World of Jan Saudek: Photographs. Jacques Baruch Gallery, Chicago, IL, 1979.
- Jan Saudek-Il teatro della vita. Giuliana Scimè, Selezione d'Imagini, Monza, Italy, 1981.
- Story from, Czechoslovakia, My Country, and Photographs by Jan Saudek. Aperture Nr. 89, New York, 1982.
- The World of Jan Saudek. Anna Fárová, The Master Collection Book III, Rotovision, Geneva, Switzerland 1983.
- Images from, Czechoslovakia. University of Iowa Museum of Art, Iowa City, IA, 1983.
- Story photo. Daniela Mrázková, Mlada Fronta, Prague, 1985.
- Jan Saudek-35 Jahre Photos / 35 Years of Photography. Manfred Heiting, Photography Forum Frankfurt, Frankfurt, Germany 1986.
- 50 Jahre moderne Farbfotografie. Manfred Heiting, Photokina, Cologne, Germany 1986.
- Jan Saudek-200 Photographs 1953-1986. Musée d'Art Moderne de la Ville de Paris, Paris, 1987.
- 20 Years of Czechoslovak Art: 1968-1988. Anne Baruch, Chicago, IL 1988.
- The Second Israeli Photography Biennale, Museum of Art, Ein Harod, Israel, 1988.
- Jan Saudek-100 Fotografías 1953-1986. Primavera Fotografica, Barcelona, Spain, 1988.
- Jan Saudek-Monsieur Nicole (fashion catalog "Matsuda"), New York 1989.1991 (?).
- Photographs Tschechoslowakische der Gegenwart. Edition Braus, Heidelberg, Germany, 1990.
- Jan Saudek-Life, Love, Death & Other Such Trifles. Art Unlimited, Amsterdam, 1991.
- Jan Saudek-Theatre of life. Daniela Mrázková, Panorama, Prague, 1991.
- Jan Saudek-l'amour. VIS & VIS Nr. 10, Paris, 1992.
- Jan Saudek, Galerie Municipale du Chateau d'Eau, Toulouse, France, 1992.
- Photo La Collection de la FNAC, Calais des Estats de Bourgogne, Dijon, France 1993.
- Jan Saudek-life, love, death & other such trivia. Slovart, Prague, 1994.
- Jan Saudek-Jubilations and Obsessions. Rosbeek, Amsterdam, 1995.
- Jan Saudek-Letter. Sarah Saudek, Prague, 1995.
- The World of Jan Saudek 1959–1995. Museum of Art, Olomouc, Czech Republic, 1995.
- Jan Saudek 1895 Krišal Gallery, Geneva, Switzerland, 1995.
- Photographie des 20. Jahrhunderts. Museum Ludwig, Taschen, Cologne, Germany 1996.
- Security and search in, Czech Republic photography of the 90s. Vl. Birgus / Mir.Vojtěchovský, Kant, Prague, 1996.
- The Photography Book. Phaidon Press, London, 1997.
- Jan Saudek-Photographs 1987–1997. Taschen, Cologne, Germany, 1997.
- The Body in Contemporary, Czech Republic Photography. Vl. Birgus Macintosh Gallery, Glasgow, Scotland, 1997.
- Jan Saudek. Christiane Fricke, Taschen, Cologne, Germany, 1998.
- From Sudek to Saudek- Czech Photography in the 20th Century, The Eli Lemberger Museum of Photography, Tel-Hai, Israel, 1998.
- Masterpieces of Erotic Photography. Carlton, London, 1998.
- Jan Saudek three-Love. BB Art, Prague, 1998.
- Zärtliche Betrachtung schöner Damen-aus der Sammlung Photo Fritz Gruber. Wienand Verlag, Cologne, Germany, 1998.
- Absolut Originale, Absolit Originale Collection. Stockholm, Sweden, 1999.
- Jan Saudek 1959–1999. Mennour Gallery, Paris, 1999.
- Jan Saudek Single-married divorced widower. Slovart, Praha, Czech Republic, 2000.
- 20th Century Photography. Museum Ludwig, Cologne, Germany 2001.
- Jan Saudek-Realities. Arena Edition, Santa Fe, NM, 2002.
- Czech and Slovak Photography 80s and 90s of the 20th century. the Art Museum, Olomouc, Czech Republic 2002.
- Absolut Generations. 50th Venice Biennale, Venice, Italy 2003.
- Dictionary of, Czech Republicech and Slovak artists 1950–2004. Chagall Art Centre, Ostrava, Czech Republic 2004.
- Saudek. Daniela Mrázková, Slovart, Prague, 2005.
- The Best of Jan Saudek. Saudek.com, Prague, 2005.
- Chains of Love. Saudek.com, Prague, 2007.
- Evenings with a photographer. IDIF, Prague, 2007.
- ACP-learn creative shooting. Zoner Press, Brno, Czech Republic, 2007.
- 2006/2007 National Theatre. Gallery, Prague, 2007.
- Jan Saudek (1998, Taschen) ISBN 3-8228-7916-9.
- Pouta lásky (Chains of Love). [Saudek.com] ISBN 80-239-8225-7.
- Saudek. Prague: Slovart. ISBN 80-7209-727-X.
- Saudek, Jan: Ženatý, svobodný, rozvedený, vdovec. Prague: Slovart, 2000. ISBN 80-7209-701-6.
- Saudek, Jan: Národní divadlo 2006/07. National Theatre 2006/07 Season. Prague: Národní divadlo, 2007. ISBN 9788072582716.

== Films and radio ==
- Jan Saudek: Prague Printemps (1990). (26-minute film by Jerome de Missolz about Saudek).
- Jan Saudek: Bound by Passion (2008). (feature-length film by Adolf Zika about Saudek).
- Saudek Brothers Documentary, Czech Radio, 2001

== Solo exhibitions ==
1963

- Divadlo Na zábradlí, Prague, Czech Republic

1969

- Indiana University Bloomington, Bloomington, IN

1976

- Art Institute of Chicago, Chicago, IL
- Jacques Baruch Gallery, Chicago, IL

1977

- Australian Centre for Photography, Sydney, Australia
- National Gallery of Victoria, Melbourne, Australia
- RIP, Arles, France

1978

- Cincinnati Art Museum, Cincinnati, OH

1979

- G. Ray Hawkins Gallery, Los Angeles, CA

1980

- FNAC - Montparnasse, Paris
- photokina, Cologne, Germany

1981

- Cincinnati Art Museum, Cincinnati, OH
- Jacques Baruch Gallery, Chicago, IL
- Marcuse Pfeifer Gallery, New York

1984

- Musee National d'Art Moderne, Centre Georges Pompidou, Paris

1985

- Münchner Stadtmuseum, München, Germany

1986

- Centre national de la photographie, Paris
- Photography Forum Frankfurt, Frankfurt, Germany

1987

- Musee d'Art Moderne de la Ville de Paris, Paris

1989

- Photography Forum Frankfurt, Frankfurt, Germany
- Jan Kesner Gallery, Los Angeles, CA

1990

- Robert Koch Gallery, Los Angeles, CA
- Gallery Yokohama, Yokohama, Japan
- RIP, Arles, France

1991

- Musee National d'Art Moderne, Centre Georges Pompidou, Paris
- Portfolio Gallery, London

1992

- Galerie Municipale du Chateau d'Eau, Toulouse, France

1993

- Month of Photography, Palffy Palace, Bratislava, Slovakia

1994

- Parco Gallery, Tokyo

1995

- A Gallery for fine photography, New Orleans, LA

1996

- Museum of Art, Olomouc, Czech Republic

1997

- Museo Ken Damy, Brescia, Italy
- Paris Photo, Krišal Gallery, Paris

1998

- Bergamot Station Art Center BGH Gallery, Santa Monica, CA
- Municipal House in Prague, Czech Republic
- The Museum of Photography, Tel-Hai, Israel

1999

- Paris Photo Gallery Mennour, Paris
- VB Photographic Centre, Kuopio, Finland

2000

- Carousel de Louvre, Paris Art Gallery Mennour, Paris

2001

- Comenius Museum, Naarden, Netherlands
- University of Nottingham

2003

- Broel Museum
- Biennale de Venise, Italy
- FIAC, Galerie K. Mennour, Paris
- Krišal Gallery, Geneve, Switzerland

2004

- Krišal Gallery, Geneve, Switzerland
- Lattuada Studio Gallery, Milan, Italy

2005

- House White Unicorn, Prague, Czech Republic
- Gallery of Photography Past Rays, Japan
- K. Mennour Gallery, Paris

2006

- International fotobienále, 6th edition, Moscow, Russia
- IN FOCUS Gallery, Cologne, Germany

2007

- Galerie Jan Saudek, Prague, Czech Republic

2008

- Velvet Gallery, Bojnice, Slovakia
- Royal Palace (along with JPWitkinem (Joel-Peter Witkin?)), Milan, Italy

2009

- Gallery Velvet Kelly, Žilina, Slovakia
- Monopoli-Castello Carlo V., Italy

2010

- Fotografija Gallery, Ljubljana, Slovenia
- Fotofestival Nordic Light, Kristiansund, Norway
- Kunsthandel gallery, Graz, Austria
- Nordic Light (int. Festival of photography) Kristiansund, Norway
- Fotografia Galerija, Ljubljana, Slovenia

2011

- Chamber Gallery U Schell, Budweis, Czech Republic
- Visio Art Gallery, Plzeň
- Mondo Bizzarro Gallery, Rome, Italy
- Phototheatron, Athens, Greece
- Galerie Esther Woerdehoff (group exhibition), Paris
- Ballarat Int. Photo Biennale, Melbourne, Australia

2012

- Int. Photofestival Spillimbergo & Udine, Italy Centres of Art, Tarnow, Poland

2013

- Blatenský Fotofestival, Blatná, Czech Republic
- Galerie Malá Synagoga, Trnava, Slovakia

2015: Valeria Rabbit Hole Art Room, Warsaw, Poland 2020: Malostranská beseda, Prague, Czech Republic

== Collections ==
Saudek's work is held in the following permanent collections:

- The Art Institute of Chicago, Chicago, IL
- Boston Museum of Fine Arts, Boston, MA
- Centre Georges Pompidou, Paris
- International Museum of Photography at George Eastman House, Rochester, NY
- The Metropolitan Museum of Art, New York
- Moravian Gallery in Brno, Czech Republic
- Musée d'Art Moderne de la Ville de Paris, Paris
- Musée Paul Getty, Los Angeles, CA
- Museum Ludwig, Cologne, Germany
- National Gallery of Australia, Canberra, Australia
- National Gallery of Victoria, Melbourne, Australia
