= Hugh Edwards (curator) =

American curator

Hugh Edwards (1903–1986) was an American curator of photography, based in Chicago, Illinois at the Art Institute of Chicago during the 1960s. Considered highly influential, Edwards was one of a handful of key curators, along with Alfred Stieglitz, Edward Steichen and John Szarkowski, who worked to gain the acceptance in the United States of fine art photography and documentary photography as art forms.

== Early life and education ==
Hugh Logan Edwards Jr was born as the only child of his parents in the river city of Paducah, Kentucky, at the confluence of the Tennessee and Ohio rivers. His family was deeply attached to the rivers of the American South: his father was an engineer on a steamboat and his grandfather was a river pilot. A great uncle had fought on the Confederate side of the Civil War, taking a family slave to act as valet, and fighting in the Battle of Shiloh.

Although Edwards did not have formal education beyond high school, he became a highly cultured, self-taught man who was fluent in French and Italian, the better to read literature of those countries in the original languages. He became known for his love of music and collection of American and European literature.

== Career ==
Edwards's first job after high school was as a librarian in Paducah at the McCracken County Public Library. His parents encouraged him to continue his study of piano and he moved to Chicago, which opened a larger world to him.

He became an assistant at the Art Institute of Chicago. In 1959, he was appointed as Curator of Prints & Drawings, serving until 1970. He was responsible for the significant collection of photographs there and expanded the collection, acquiring some three thousand prints. He also organized seventy-five shows during his time at the Art Institute. In many cases, Edwards led the Art Institute to be the first museum to offer a solo show to young photographers who later became important in the field, such as Robert Frank, Raymond Moore, and others. Edwards struggled to curate in the small, cramped gallery space and without the financial resources to produce accompanying exhibition catalogs.

Shy and retiring, and without a college education, Edwards did not become a public champion of photography and rarely wrote about it beyond reviewing. But in the years before the art world's acceptance of photography, Edwards offered vital support and encouragement to many emerging photographers, including Jan Saudek, Duane Michals, Algimantas Kezys, Danny Lyon and others. According to Lyon, "Edwards ushered in what is known as the Golden Age of Chicago Photography. He expressed himself mostly in conversation and through the photographers he chose to exhibit."

Edwards was also a practicing photographer; during the 1950s he worked on a decade-long project to document the people of a roller rink in Harvey, Illinois. He ceased photographing in 1961. When asked why he no longer photographed, he responded, " 'Why should I?' Hugh answered. 'Other people take them for me'.”
