= Edith Allard =

American ballerina

Edith Allard (March 16, 1927 – September 26, 2012) was an American ballerina.

== Early life and career (1927–1949) ==
Allard was born on March 16, 1927, to Russian parents in Chicago, Illinois. She had an older sister, Jean (1922 - 2022). Her family lived in Hoopeston, Illinois for several years where she began grammar school and her dance education. Later, they moved to Chicago and Allard studied with Mary Vandas. In 1945, she was awarded a scholarship to study at the School of American Ballet in New York for one year. While at the School of American Ballet she studied with Oboukoff, Pierre Vladimiroff, Ann Barzel, and Muriel Stuart. By 1949 she had danced with Ruth Page's Chicago Opera Ballet, the Radio City Music Hall corps de ballet, and touring companies, including the Markova-Dolin company as soloist.

== Career in Europe (1949–1971) ==
In 1949, Allard left New York for Paris, motivated to study with the famous Russian ballerinas Lubov Egorova, Olga Preobrajenska, and Nicholai Zveroff from the Diaghilev ballet. Allard later credited dancer Jerome Andrews with inspiring her to go to Paris. She remained in Paris for 11 years. During the Paris years Allard was contracted at several locales: Theatre du Chatelet as soloist, music and ballet festivals with John Taras as choreographer at Aix en Provence and Geneva, Switzerland; opera season in Genoa, Italy; Danse et Culture as a soloist touring France; and the company "Le Rendezvous Manqué" with John Taras, touring Paris, Monte Carlo, Germany, Holland, Italy, Norway, Denmark, Sweden, Boston, and New York.

In 1960, Allard was contracted at the Malmö City Theatre in Sweden as soloist for one year, followed by a summer touring operetta company as soloist. She danced in My Fair Lady in Gothenburg, Sweden, then was contracted at the Stora Teatern in Gothenburg. She remained in Gothenburg until 1971, and also worked as a soloist during this period. Allard took a year-long leave of absence from 1963 to 1964 to dance with the Jazz Ballet in Stockholm, and then as Premiere danseuse at the National Opera in Tel Aviv, where she also taught company classes. Returning to Gothenburg after her leave, she remained at the Stora Teatern until she retired at age 44, the age of retirement for Swedish dancers.

== Retirement and teaching career (1971–2012) ==
Immediately following her retirement as a dancer, Allard's teaching career began. From the fall of 1971 until 1974 she was the company teacher for the Opéra National de Lyon. She guest taught at Rosella Hightower's Centre de Danse in Cannes and several courses for the Federation Française de Danse Classique et Contemporaine. Allard returned to Sweden in 1974, where she continued her teaching career in Stockholm. Allard taught professional dancers and children at the Balett Akademien, Ivo Cramer's Ballet, the Cullberg Ballet, Norrköping Ballet, Kulturama, and other schools.

Allard taught dancers at all levels at the Royal Opera School for eight years, and taught at the University College of Dance for sixteen years. From 1984 to 1985 Allard was at the La Scala Theatre Ballet in Milan as teacher and assistant under the direction of Rosella Hightower. After that she served as guest teacher for the Ballet d'Avignon at the Opera d'Avignon, at the Teatro Massimo in Palermo, Italy, and all levels at the Royal Ballet School in London. Allard retired from teaching at the University College of Dance in 1992, and afterwards became an instructor for exercise groups for heart and lung patients, as well as teaching the Chinese exercise program of Qigong.

Allard married Ingemar Larsson in 1974, who died in May 2009. Allard remained in Stockholm, Sweden, until her death on September 26, 2012, at the age of 85.
