= Meopta =

Czech company

Meopta s.r.o.
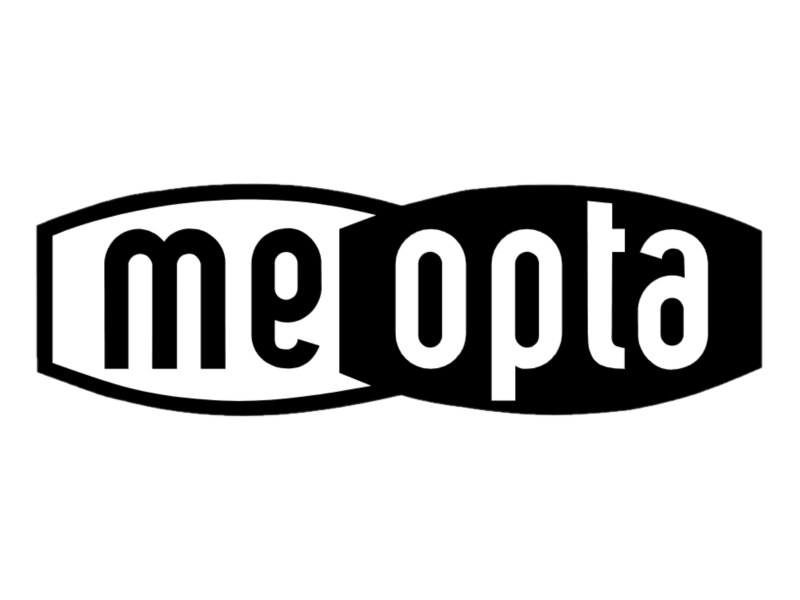
- Formerly: Optikotechna
- Type: Private
- Industry: Optics and optoelectronics
- Founded: 1933; 93 years ago
- Founders: Alois Beneš; Alois Mazurek
- Headquarters: Přerov, Czech Republic
- Area served: Worldwide
- Products: Optical components; Optomechanical systems; Optoelectronic systems
- Revenue: CZK 3.3 billion (2025)
- Operating income: CZK 1.217 billion (2022)
- Net income: CZK −1.16 billion (October 2023–December 2024)
- Total assets: CZK 18.775 billion (2024)
- Owner: The Carlyle Group
- Number of employees: c. 1,100 (2026)
- Website: www.meopta.com

Meopta s.r.o. is a Czech manufacturer of optical, optomechanical and optoelectronic components and systems, headquartered in Přerov. It supplies manufacturers of semiconductor production and inspection equipment, as well as customers in the medical, industrial and defence sectors. Its products include optical assemblies for digital projectors and sighting and observation systems for armoured vehicles.

Alois Beneš and Alois Mazurek founded Optikotechna in Přerov in 1933. After its nationalisation in 1945, the factory became part of Meopta, a state-owned enterprise formed in 1946 from several optical and precision-engineering manufacturers. Its historical products include Flexaret cameras, photographic enlargers and Meopton cinema projectors. After privatisation in the 1990s, the business came under the ownership of the Czech-American Rausnitz family. Investment firm Carlyle acquired control in October 2023.

== History ==
Alois Beneš and Alois Mazurek founded Optikotechna in Přerov, Czechoslovakia, in 1933. Beneš financed the venture and housed it in his premises in Přerov. Mazurek took charge of production. The factory’s first products were lenses and condensers; photographic enlargers were added as the business expanded.

Zbrojovka Brno bought Optikotechna in 1935, and a new factory designed by Robert Motka was built in 1936–1937. The company supplied sights, periscopes and binoculars to the Czechoslovak Army. In early 1939, it acquired the rights to manufacture twin-lens reflex cameras developed by the firm Bratři Bradáčové. The acquired Flexette design became the basis of the Flexaret camera range. During the German occupation of Czechoslovakia, Optikotechna ordered to supply optical equipment to the German armed forces.

After nationalisation in 1945, Optikotechna joined Srb a Štys, ETA and SOMET in the new state-owned enterprise Meopta, established in 1946. After 1948, the firms Jindřich Suchánek and Bratři Bradáčové also became part of Meopta. Its products included photographic enlargers, still and movie cameras, projectors, microscopes, surveying instruments and military optics.

Meopta manufactured cinema projectors for domestic use and export. During the 1950s, it adapted its Meopton III projector for widescreen films and developed the Meopton IIIa. Czechoslovak State Film requested changes to the projectors for widescreen screenings in its cinemas.

In 1953, Meopta’s design and development department in Přerov became the Institute for Research in Optics and Fine Mechanics (ÚVOJM). An internal design studio followed in the 1960s. Its designers included Danuše Mazurová, who worked on Meo 35 projectors and photographic enlargers, and Eduard Kupka, whose work included 16 mm projectors and stereoscopic viewers.

Military orders began declining in the second half of the 1980s. During the restructuring that followed, Meopta sought new civilian business, including laser levelling equipment and medical products. Meopta Přerov became a joint-stock company in 1991, and its optical-component division became a separate company, Meopta–optika, in 1994. By 2000, Meopta–optika was owned by Czech-American businessman Paul Rausnitz and his nephew Gerald Rausnitz. Paul Rausnitz also acquired a controlling stake in Meopta Přerov in March 2000.

Work on Meopta’s research centre began in 2010 and finished in 2011, with funding from the Ministry of Industry and Trade. The project included reconstruction of the research building and new equipment for laboratories and prototype workshops.

Investment firm Carlyle acquired control of Meopta in October 2023, with the Rausnitz family retaining a minority stake. In June 2024, Meopta–optika merged into its parent company, Meopta s.r.o.

== Meopta U.S.A. ==
The company which became Meopta U.S.A., Inc. was founded by the Czech-American Rausnitz family in New York in 1960 under the name Tyrolit Company, Inc. At that time, its main business was selling grinding wheels in the United States and Canada. Tyrolit gradually shifted to manufacturing optical products and was renamed Meopta U.S.A., Inc. in 2005.

Meopta U.S.A. adopted the name Global Photonics in March 2024. Gooch & Housego completed its acquisition of Global Photonics on 18 June 2025. The business, based in Trinity, Florida, became known as G&H Tampa.

== Operations ==
ASML, KLA and Applied Materials use Meopta’s optical and optomechanical assemblies in machines that manufacture, measure and inspect semiconductor wafers. The assemblies are used in lithography machines and equipment for measuring and inspecting semiconductor wafers. Optical components and mechanical parts are made at Meopta’s Přerov site, where the company also assembles systems in cleanrooms and tests them.

The company also manufactures military sights and observation systems. It produces and tests assemblies for the Universal Tank and Anti-Aircraft System (UTAAS), a sighting and fire-control system developed by Saab for the CV90 infantry fighting vehicle. In April 2025, Meopta presented the first periscope assembly for vehicles ordered by the Czech Army. Its five-year contract with Saab covers more than 500 assemblies for vehicles destined for Czechia, Slovakia, Sweden and Denmark.

Meopta makes X-ray image intensifiers and supplies optomechanical assemblies for use in dentistry and ophthalmology. It also makes parts for digital cinema projectors.

== Cameras ==
Cameras
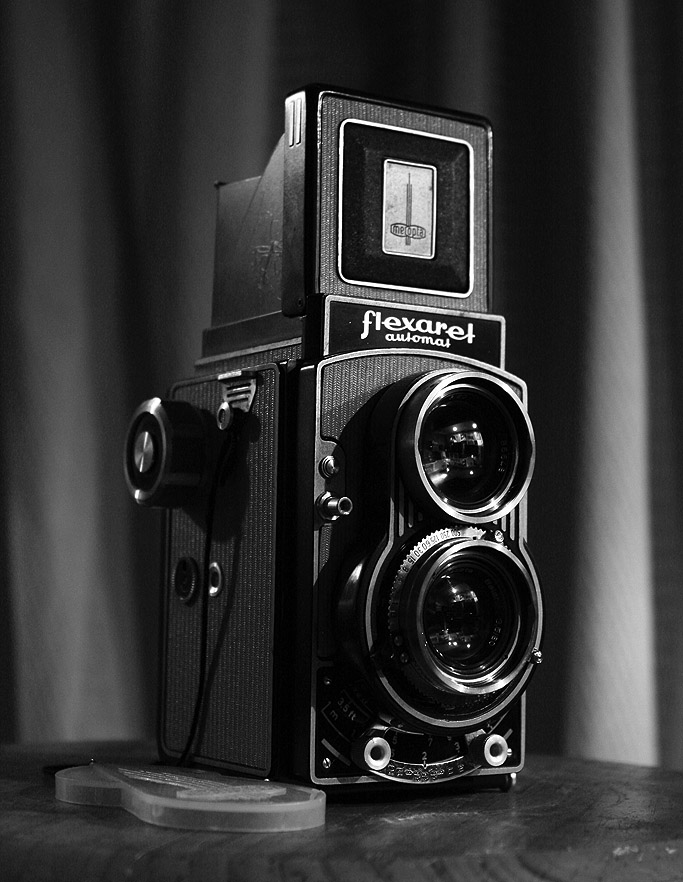
Flexaret VII Automat 1967

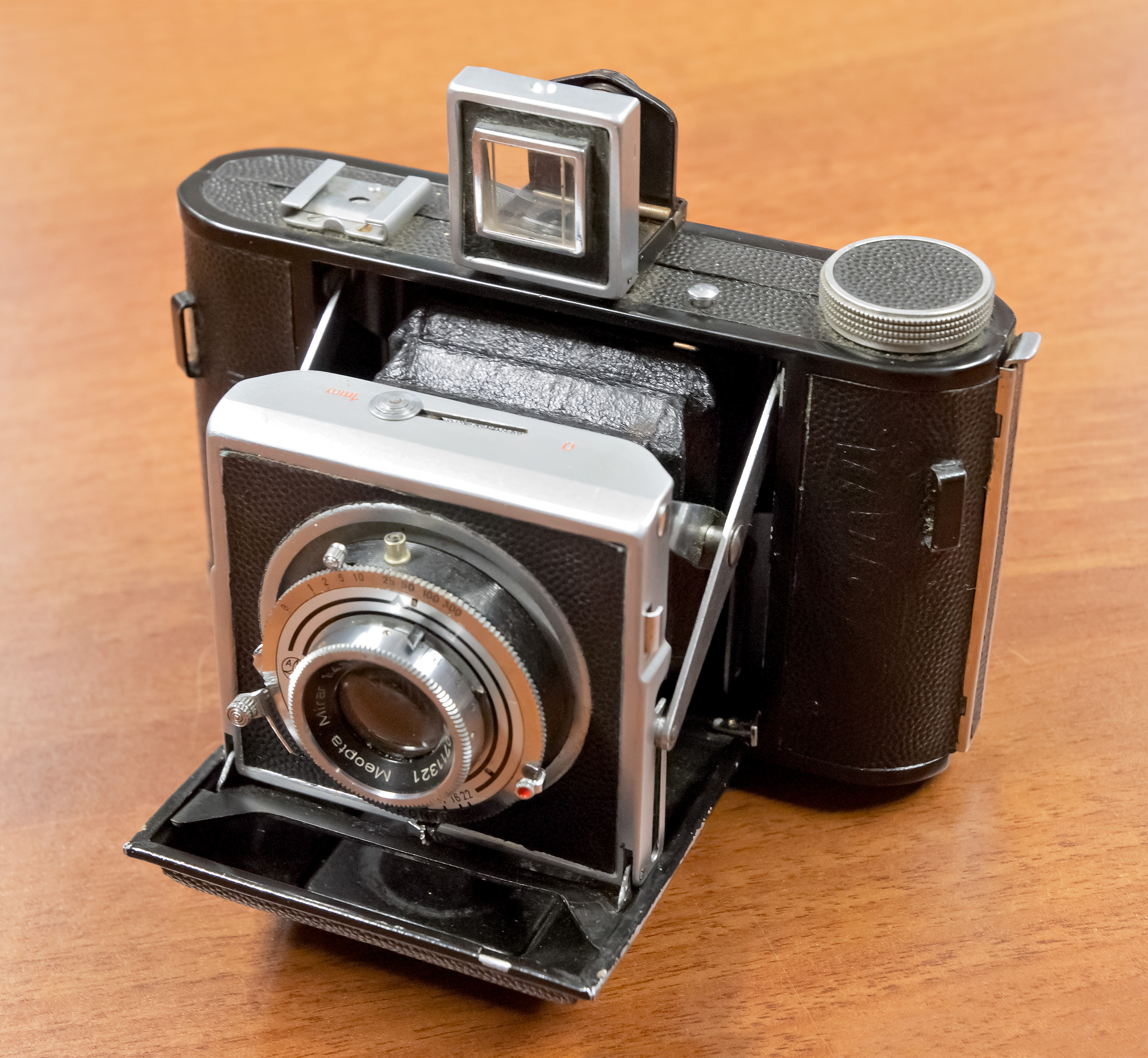
Milona

Large format 13x18

- Magnola

TLR 6x6

- Flexette
- Autoflex
- Optiflex
- Flexaret
- Flexaret II
- Flexaret III
- Flexaret IV
- Flexaret V
- Flexaret Standart
- Flexaret automat VI
- Flexaret automat VII

Folding 6x6

- Milona

Panoramic 6x23.5

- Pankopta

Interchangeable lens 35 mm

- Opema I
- Opema II

Fixed lens 35 mm

- Cola
- Etareta
- Optineta
- Opema 95
- Axoma AF 96

Stereo 35 mm

- Stereo 35

Subminiature 16 mm

- Mikroma
- Mikroma II
- Mikronette

Stereo 16 mm

- Stereo-Mikroma
- Stereo-Mikroma II

== Enlargers ==
Professional enlargers

- Agrand (1967–68) – 10x12
- Meogrand (1968–70) – 6x9

Large format

- Laborant (1939) – 9x12
- Magnitarus 10x15 (1954–68)
- Magnitarus 13x18 (1954–72)
- Herkules (1955–69) – 18x24

Medium format 6x9

- Multifax (1933)
- Magnifax (1954–67)
- Magnifax II (1958–73)
- Magnifax 3 (1972–80)
- Magnifax 3a (1981–84)
- Magnifax 4 (1985)
- Magnifax 4a (1998)

Medium format 6x7

- Opemus 7

Medium format 6x6

- Opematus (1940-45)
- Opemus 6x6 (1953–70)
- Opemus II
- Opemus IIa (1960–69)
- Opemus III (1969–75)
- Opemus Standard (1970)
- Opemus 4 (1974–77)
- Opemus Standard 2 (1977)
- Opemus 5 (1978–80)
- Opemus 5a (1982–84)
- Opemus 6 (1985)
- Opemus 6 Standard (1986)
- Opemus 6a (1998)
- Opemus 6 Student
- Opemus 6 Super

Medium format 6x4.5

- Ideal (1934)

Medium format 4x4

- Colombo (1936)
- Opemus 4x4 (1953-70)

Small format 24x36

- Axomat (1938)
- Axomat Ia (1960–69)
- Axomat II (1969–71)
- Axomat 3 (1974–77)
- Axomat mini
- Axomat 4 (1978–80)
- Axomat 4a (1980–84)
- Axomat Standard
- Axomat 5 (1985)
- Axomat 5 Standard (1986)
- Axomat 5a (1998)
- Axomat 5 Autofocus
- Axomat 5 Student
- Proximus (1961–67)
- Proximus 2 (1970)

Subminiature 11x14

- Mignoret (1961–62)

=== Enlarger Heads ===
Color Heads

- Barevná hlava (Color Head)
- Meochrom
- Meochrom 2
- Meopta Color 3
- Meopta Color 4-ES

Variable Contrast Heads

- Meograde

Projection Heads

- Projekční hlava (Projection Head)

Power Supplies

- Meochrom trafo
- TR 100
- ST 100

== Movie cameras ==
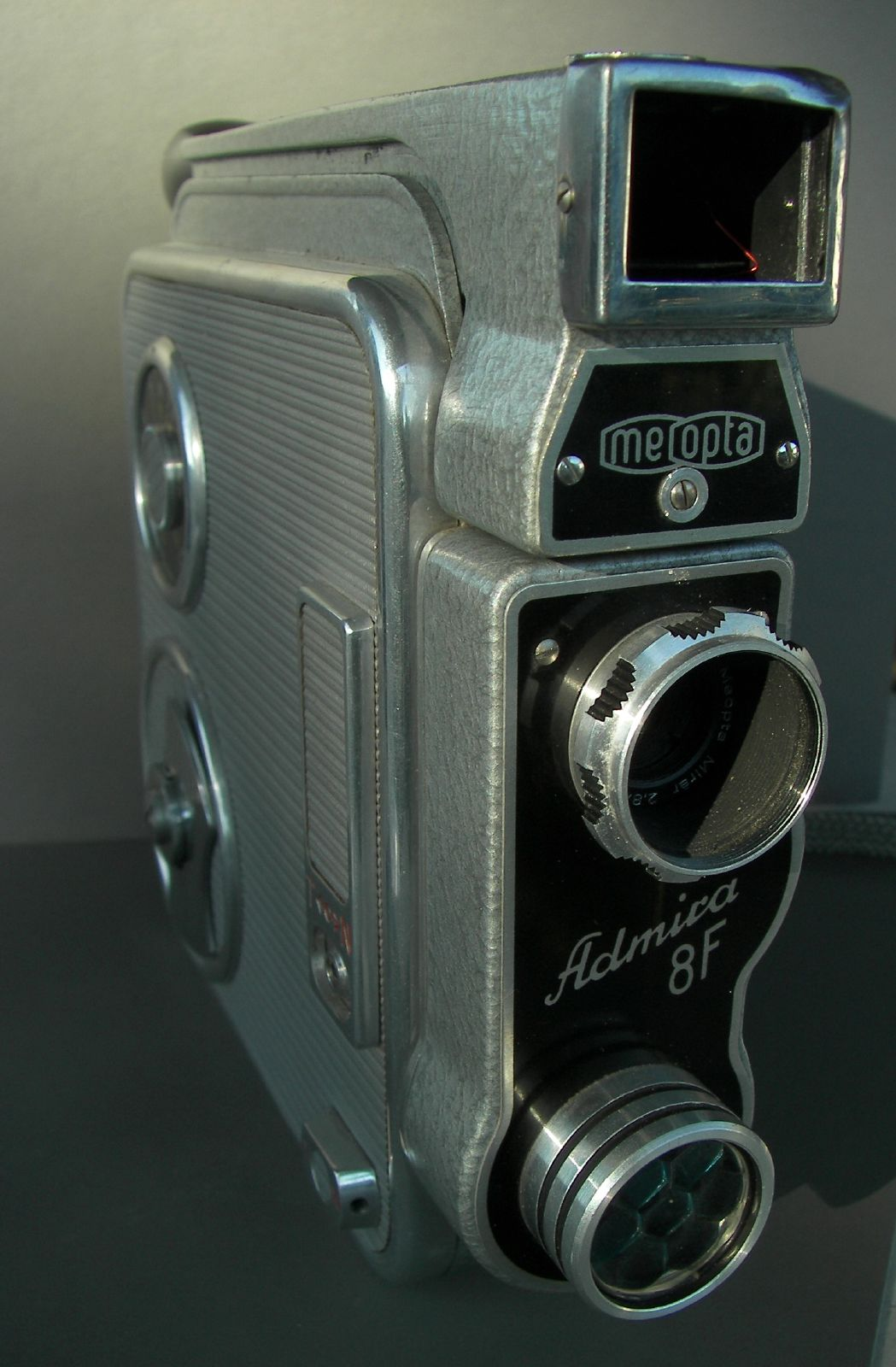
Admira 8 F

8 mm Cameras

- OP 8 (1939)
- Somet 8 (1956)
- Admira 8 C (?–46)
- Admira 8 D (1946–51)
- Admira 8 E (1952–57)
- Admira 8 II (1955–58)
- Admira 8 IIa (1958–61)
- Admira 8 IIb (1958–62)
- Admira 8 F (1960–64)
- Admira EL 8 (1962–64) – the only camera with zoom lens
- A8 G (1964–68)
- A8 G0 (1966–67)
- A8 G2 (1966–68)
- A8 G0 Supra (1968–73)
- A8 G1 Supra (1968–71)
- A8 G2 Supra (1968–71)
- A8 L1 Supra (1971–77)
- A8 L2 Supra (1971–77)

Supra is an indication for Super 8.

9.5 mm Cameras

- Admira Ledvinka (1934)

16 mm Cameras

- Admira 16 (1932)
- Admira 16 A Electric
- Admira 16 A1 Electric (1963–68)

== Movie projectors ==
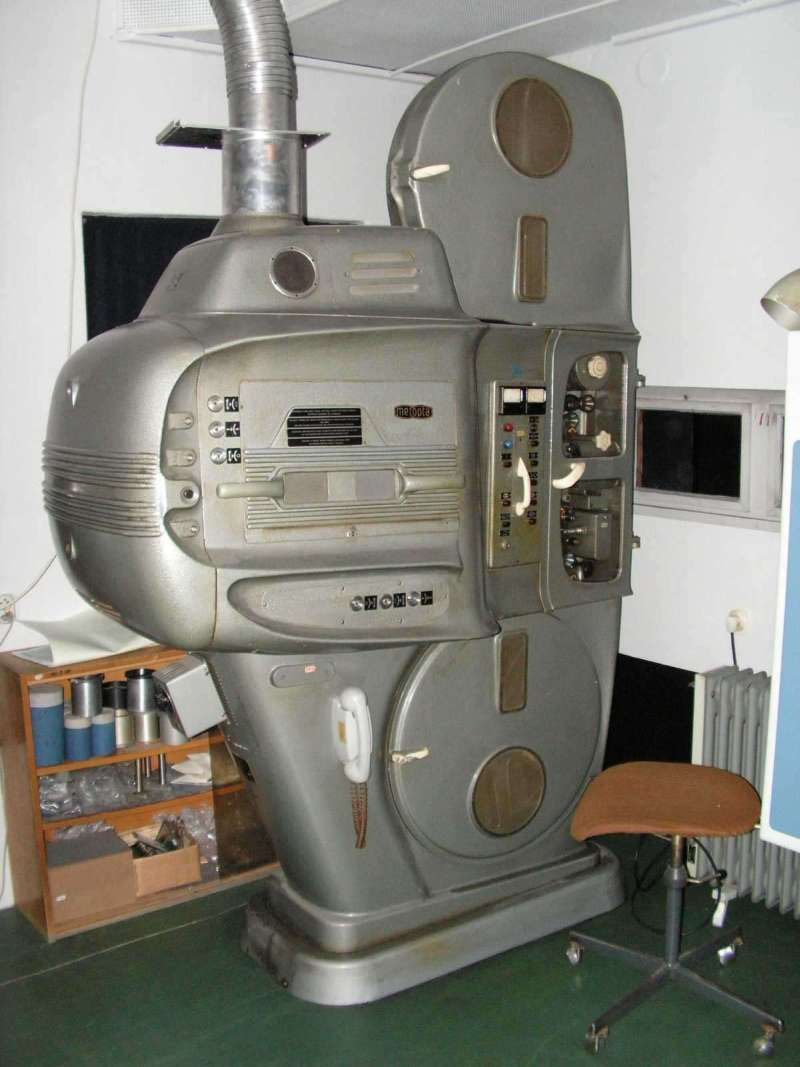
Meopton UM 70/35

8 mm projectors

- OP 8 (1936)
- Somet 8 (1938)
- Optilux (1945–50)
- Atom (1940–45)
- Meo 8 (1954–60)
- AM 8 (1960–69)
- Meocord (1966–67)
- AM 8 Super (1967–70)
- Meolux (1969)
- Meolux 2 (1972–77)
- KP 8 Super
- KP 8 Super 2 (1976–80)
- Meos Duo (1977–86)
- Meos (1978)

9.5 mm projectors

- Scolar (1934) – modular projector for 9.5mm/8mm and 5x5 slides
- Jubilar 9.5 (1945–50)

16 mm projectors

- Almo 16 (1936)
- Pictureta (1936)
- OP 16 silent and sound (1938)
- OP 16 (1951)
- Opefon (1945)
- Club 16 (1962–63)
- Club 16B
- Club 16C
- Meoclub 16 (1965)
- Meoclub 16 Automatic (1968)
- Meoclub 16 Automatic H (1970)
- Meoclub 16 Automatic S (1974–78)
- Meoclub 16 Electronic (1980–84)
- Meoclub 16 AS 2 (1982–84)
- Meoclub 16 Electronic 2 (1984)
- Meoclub 16 AS 3
- Meoclub 16 AS 3a

16 mm cinema projectors

- Meopton I (1945–50)
- Meopton II (1945–50)
- Meopton IIa (1966)

35 mm cinema projectors

- Eta 7 (1947)
- Meopton III (1955–57)
- Meopton IV (1959) - IV S with magnetic soundhead
- Meopton UM 70/35 (1963–73)
- Meo IVa
- Meo 5X series (1978-?)

== Sport optics ==
Meopta is producing Binoculars, Telescopic sights, Red dot sights and Monoculars on the field of sport optics and caters hunters, birdwatchers and sport shooters. In 2019 the production includes the following series of products:

Binoculars:

- Meostar B1
- MeoRange (available only in EU, with laser rangefinder integrated)
- MeoPro HD
- MeoSport
- Optika HD

Rifle Scopes

- Steyr AUG factory optics
- MeoTac
- MeoStar R2
- Meostar R1
- MeoPro Optika 6
- MeoPro
- ZD

Reflex sights

- MeoSight III
- MeoRed
