= Jean Weidt =

German dancer and choreographer (1904–1988)

- Born: Hans Weidt; 7 October 1904; Barmbek, Hamburg, Germany
- Died: 29 August 1988 (aged 83); Rangsdorf, East Germany
- Occupations: Dancer; Choreographer
- Political party: KPD
- Spouse: Ursula Wendorff-Weidt
- Children: Michael Weidt (stepson) 1946; Andreas Weidt 1956

Jean Weidt is the name generally used by and in respect of Hans Weidt (7 October 1904 – 29 August 1988) who was a dancer and choreographer. As a young man he participated in the Hamburg Uprising. He was born and died in Germany, but between 1933 and 1948 he made his life outside Nazi Germany, chiefly but by no means exclusively living and working in Paris.

Jean Weidt is identified in several sources as a pioneer of expressionist choreography.

== Life ==
=== Hamburg: early years ===
Hans Weidt was born in Barmbek, at that time a village a short distance outside Hamburg on its east side. He grew up in conditions of poverty with a father described in one source as an "alcoholic social democrat". In the economic austerity and socio-political turbulence of post-war Germany he left home aged sixteen in order to pursue his passion to become a dancer. He took gardening jobs and for a time worked in the port as a coal trimmer in order to support himself and fund his dance lessons. He studied briefly with Sigurd Leeder in 1921, also taking lessons with Olga Brandt-Knack. Between 1925 and 1928 he performed with his first dance group, appearing at venues that included the Curiohaus and little Kammerspiele Theatre, both in Hamburg, presenting his pieces "Aufruf" ("The Call"), "Der Arbeiter" ("The Worker") and "Tanz mit der roten Fahne" ("Dancing with the Red Flag"). By the end of the decade he had been talent spotted by Olga Brandt-Knack and made his debut at the Hamburg State Opera, in 1928 taking the lead role in "Der Gaukler und das Klingelspiel" ("The Juggler and the Bell Game"), and coming to the attention of the youthful theatre impresario Gustaf Gründgens, the writer Klaus Mann and the dancer-choreographer Mary Wigman.

In the wake of Germany's military defeat and the subsequent economic collapse, politics in the country had become increasingly polarised: Hans Weidt became an active member of an artistic left-wing movement. He was an active participants in the Hamburg Uprising which erupted in October 1923. He identified himself as a member of the working class and he wanted to dance on working class themes for working class audiences. His dancing was "not so much about expressionism or some such aesthetic movement, but a kind of "Agitprop art" - political propaganda - which still needed to be completely convincing artistically. [Their] purpose was to find an appropriate and contemporary format for content that had previously been denigrated."

=== Berlin: success and more politics ===
With his company "The Red Dancers", in 1929 Weidt moved to Berlin where he took to presenting socio-political dance evenings. The theatre director Erwin Piscator engaged him at the Renaissance-Theater, after which, starting in 1931, he presented pieces at the Wallner Theatre organising a series of productions that included "Tai Yang erwacht" ("Tai Yang awakened") by Friedrich Wolf, for which the stage set was designed by the young John Heartfield.

Weidt reacted to the growth of Fascism in Germany by joining the Communist Party in 1931. He developed a close co-operation with "Truppe 31" ("Troup 31"), a politically engaged group of performance artists around the actor-director Gustav von Wangenheim, and included Ludwig Renn, Hans Rodenberg, John Heartfield and Arthur Pieck. The group promoted socio-critical productions including (but not restricted to) "Die Mausefalle" ("The Mousetrap"), "Passion eines Menschen" ("Passion of a People") and "Die Ehe" ("The Marriage"). Weidt became a leading protagonist of political theatre under what in retrospect has become known as the Weimar Republic, his choreographies dealing with working class topics. He warned early, loudly and frequently about the growth of Fascism in Germany and across Europe, and created the choreography for "Potsdam" (1932), in which the dancers perform with grotesque masks that symbolise Hitler and de facto accomplices such as Hugenberg, and von Papen. The message was clear.

The Nazi Party took power in January 1933 and Hans Weidt was immediately arrested. His training room and apartment in southside Berlin were destroyed together with his dancing masks and sculptures, notably some by Richard Steffens. Weidt himself spent the next few weeks in Charlottenburg Jail where he was mistreated and beaten up. Eventually, however, the theatre director Karlheinz Martin was able to secure his release.

=== Paris: exile and more balletic success ===
In May 1933 Hans Weidt escaped to Moscow, from where he moved into Paris which was becoming the informal headquarters of the German Communist Party in exile. In Paris he got to know Jean Gabin, Maurice Chevalier, Pablo Picasso (for whom he several times sat as a model) and Josephine Baker. Paris now became the focus of his professional life, although he continued to undertake tours that included Prague and Moscow. It was around this time he took to using the French language version of his name, becoming known as "Jean Weidt". Later in 1933 he founded the "Weidt Group" ballet company, which performed at Communist party sponsored rallies. Works included "Unter den Brücken von Paris" ("Under the Paris bridges"), "L’été aux champs" ("Summer in the fields") and "Sur la grande route" ("On the highway"). Some of his programme sheets included contributions from Jean Cocteau. From a younger generation, Louis Armstrong had some of his first engagements from Jean Weidt, and toured with the company across Europe between 1933 and 1936.

In 1938 Weidt established "Ballet 38" in Paris, becoming by now one of France's top dancers and choreographers, and heading up what he himself later identified, according to his son Andreas, as the country's "Undisputed Number 1" of the modern French dance scene. His choreography was responsible for the French cinema success of "Der Zauberlehrling" ("The Sorcerer's Apprentice") produced by the German Max Reichmann.

=== War ===
The French and British governments declared war on Germany in September 1939 in response to the implementation of a German-Soviet agreement to partition Poland. It was not immediately clear to the inhabitants of Paris and London what war with Germany would involve, but for Jean Weidt, and for thousands of others who had moved to France or Britain as refugees from political and / or race-based persecution in Nazi Germany, the period of waiting was relatively short. Weidt was identified as an enemy alien, facing arrest and internment. He was able to avoid arrest in Paris by escaping to (French) North Africa and ended up in Casablanca, but after the invasion of May 1940 and the installation of a new government in France, Casablanca came under the control of the Vichy government, and Weidt spent several months in a concentration camp in Algeria. Later on, when a new camp commander took over, he was on at least one occasion let out and permitted to dance for soldiers at the Algiers Opera House.

Further regime change followed in November 1942 following the Anglo-American military occupation of what was known at the time as French North Africa. Jean Weidt volunteered to join the British army, now taking an active role in the fighting against Nazi Germany in North Africa and, subsequently, in Italy.

=== Return to Paris ===
War ended in May 1945 and Weidt was discharged from the British army during the spring of 1946. He immediately returned to Paris, intending to settle there, and established the "Ballets des Arts". The theatre manager Charles Dullin arranged for him to use a studio at the Sarah Bernhardt Theatre. Coincidentally, it was the same studio that the impresario Sergei Diaghilev had made available to Nijinsky back in 1909. By this time, he was being supported in his dance activities by Dominique (1930-) and Françoise Dupuy. The Dupuys, respectively a dancer and a choreographer, and his youngest protegees who originally met one another in 1946 at a dance-class held by Jean Weidt, would later continue to present Wendt's choreography well into the twenty-first century. In Paris, Weidt built up his company and despite lack of money and frequently dire living conditions, undertook various tours across a shattered continent, including one to occupied Germany and another, in 1947, to Copenhagen. The 1947 tour of Copenhagen, which involved the "International choreography concours" where Weidt one first prize with a revolutionary piece called "La Cellule/Die Zelle" ("The Cell"). Back home in Paris, however, critics were unimpressed by his triumph in Denmark, and Jean Weidt's choreography seemed to have fallen out of fashion since the end of the war. There was a further successful tour of the Netherlands and Belgium, and his reputation remained strong in what remained of Germany, but funding continued to be a challenge. In 1948, he finally relocated to the eastern part of Berlin, since 1945 administered as part of the Soviet occupation zone, where the prospect of relatively generous government financial support for ballet beckoned.

=== Return to Berlin ===
Still in 1948, Weidt was appointed to take charge of the newly established "Dramatische Ballett" at the Berlin Volksbühne (peoples' theatre). There followed assignments in Schwerin, Hamburg and Chemnitz along with the creation in 1954, in collaboration with Hanns Eisler, of the Störtebeker Festival. In 1966 Walter Felsenstein appointed Weidt to a position with the Komische Oper Berlin. At the same time, with 40 young amateur dancers, he created the "Young Dancers" group, which he headed till his death in 1988.

In his extreme old age Jean Weidt developed the "Dance Hour" series, in which all the top dance companies of the German Democratic Republic (East Germany) took part. It was by some criteria Jean Weidt's most successful post-war production.

In 1988, the year of his death, Jean Weidt was made an honorary citizen of Rangsdorf, a district of Teltow-Fläming a short distance to the south of Berlin where by this time he lived.

== Personal ==
Jean Weidt married the painter and graphic artist Ursula Wendorff-Weidt in approximately 1952. Through the marriage he acquired as a step son the photographer Michael Weidt.
