= Toni Mau =

German painter

Toni Mau (2 September 1917 – 22 November 1981) was a German painter, graphic artist and arts academy teacher.

== Life ==
Between 1934 and 1939, and again between 1941 and 1943, Toni Mau studied at the Teaching Institute of the Berlin Museum of Applied Arts (Unterrichtsanstalt des Kunstgewerbemuseum) in Berlin-Charlottenburg. Her teachers included Hans Orlowski and Max Kaus. Between her periods of study she worked as a freelance artist and teacher, resuming her freelance career after 1943. In May 1945 the end of the war put an end to Nazi dictatorship, while a large region surrounding Berlin found itself designated and administered as the Soviet occupation zone. For a period in 1945 and 1946 Mau worked for the Red army, which she was able to combine with work as an art teacher in Werneuchen, a small town a short distance outside Berlin where a large Soviet military presence was being set up around the military airfield. She returned to Berlin in 1946 and undertook a further period of study at the Fine Arts Museum with Max Kaus. Between 1948 and 1953 she was again working freelance.

"Landscape, portrait, still life ... each is painted by the artist in a personal way. The language of the picture shows not just what was there at a particular time and place, but incorporates a permanent image of warmth, tension and sadness: it is relaxed or shrill, robust or sensitive, and thereby an image of the personality. This cannot be separated from time and context, even if the subject of the image comes from the world of fantasy"
"Landschaft, Porträt, Stillleben usw. werden von jedem Künstler auf persönliche Weise gestaltet. Die Formen-sprache zeigt nicht nur den jeweiligen Gegenstand, sondern ist auch Ausdrucksträger von Heiterkeit, Ernst, Trauer, sie ist leise oder laut, robust oder sensibel und damit Ausdruck der Persönlichkeit. Diese kann nicht getrennt von Zeit und Umwelt entstehen, auch wenn der Gegenstand aus der Welt der Phantasie stammt."

Toni Mau, 1978

In October 1949 the Soviet occupation zone was relaunched as the Soviet sponsored German Democratic Republic. By 1953, as the division of Berlin which had been implicit in the postwar settlement became increasingly stark politically and physically, Toni Mau had moved her base from West Berlin to East Berlin. She became a member of the East German Association of Visual Artists on its foundation in 1951 or 1952, and a number of commissions connected with new building projects followed. In 1953 she was appointed to a teaching post at the prestigious Academy for Visual arts in Berlin-Weissensee. However, she soon became involved in the Formalism Struggle and became the target of powerful criticism: in 1957 found herself having to abandon her teaching career despite the excellence of her teaching, to which former students have attested. She continued to work as an artist. She had already turned her attention to screen printing, a technique which at the time was largely overlooked, and which she now helped to revive.

Toni Mau died in Berlin on 22 November 1981. Her works can be seen at the Academy of Arts, the Märkisches Museum and the Kupferstichkabinett (museum of prints and drawing) in Berlin, the Kupferstich-Kabinett in Dresden, the Rostock Art Gallery and the State Museum in Schwerin as well as at public collections in Finland and Cuba. Others of her works are held in private collections.
