= Flexaret =

Czechoslovak medium-format twin-lens reflex camera 1939–1970

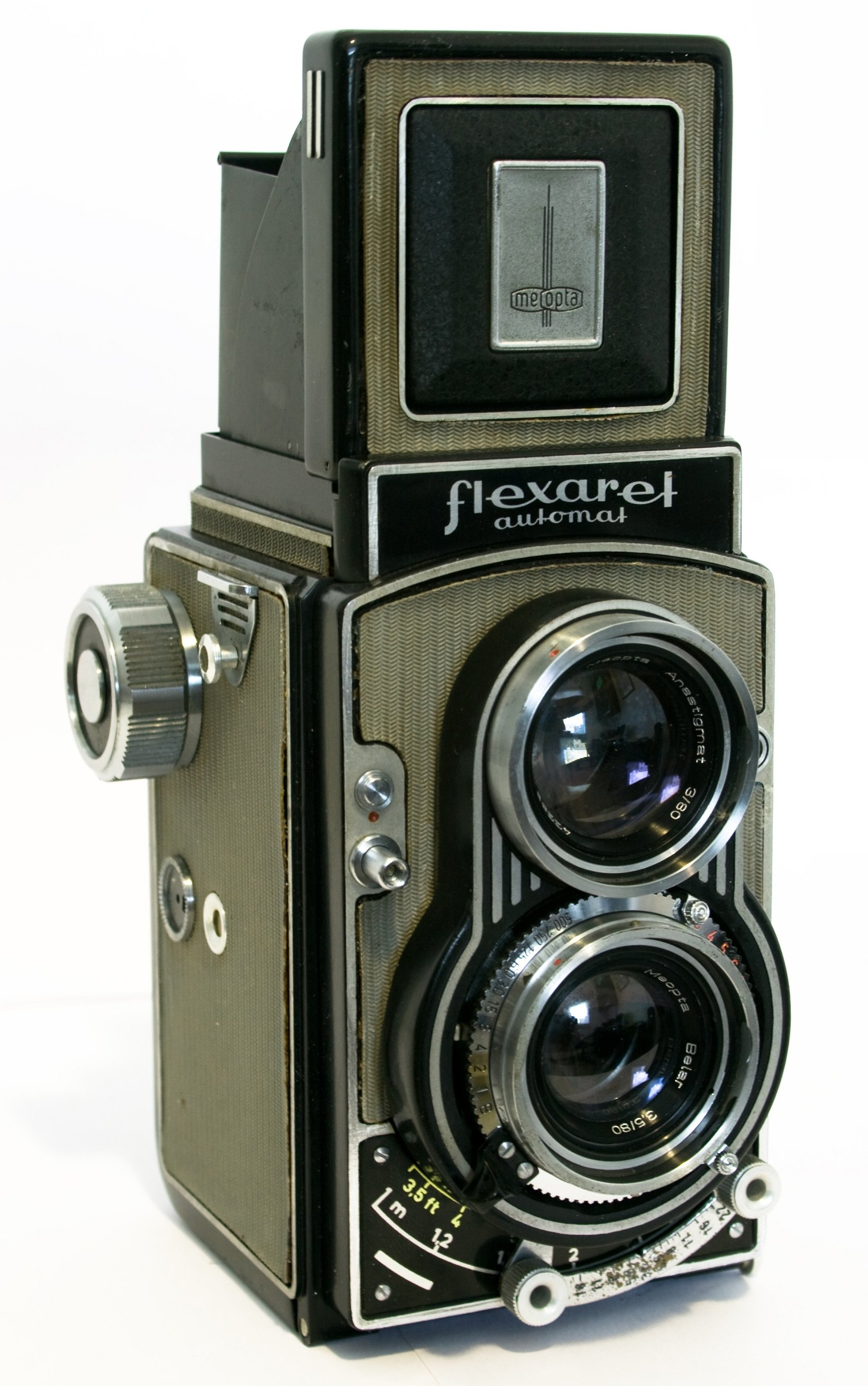
Flexaret Automat

Flexaret is a brand of cameras manufactured from 1939 to 1970 in Czechoslovakia by the company Meopta. All models of Flexaret are twin-lens reflex cameras with aluminum body, taking square "6×6" format photographs on a 120 roll film. Some models were also capable of using 35 mm film with the help of a special adapter.

== History ==
In 1939, the company Optikotechna bought a factory producing photographic equipment in Přerov. Optikotechna initially developed and improved older models (known as Autoflex and Flexette). The development of a new camera called Flexaret started in the post-World War II years in the Meopta company, founded in 1946. The camera was intended rather for amateur photography; the handling was easy and technical parameters were simple. The Flexaret rapidly became popular in Czechoslovak households and its popularity lasted until the 1960s. However, the strategy of the Council for Mutual Economic Assistance among communist states demanded subordination of national interests to the central planning process dictated by the Soviet Union. The tradition and competition were suppressed by political interests. The last cameras were produced after the 1968 Soviet invasion and in 1970 when the production was cancelled due to lack of parts from East Germany, after which the brand was replaced by the inferior Soviet Lubitel camera line.

The Czech photographer Jan Saudek called Flexaret "our [Czech] national pride".

== Literature ==
- Einhorn, Erich: Fotografujeme zrcadlovkou Flexaret, Prague: SNTL, 1960 (in Czech)
- Einhorn, Erich: Flexaret v praxi: Příručka o jeho obsluze a příslušenství i o možnostech jeho využití v jednotlivých oborech fotografické práce, Prague: SNTL, 1968 (in Czech)
