= Ursula Wendorff-Weidt =

German painter (1919–2000)

- Born: Ursula Wendorff; 6 August 1919; Berlin-Moabit, Berlin, Free State of Prussia, Germany
- Died: 23 September 2000 (aged 81); Berlin-Spandau, Berlin, Germany
- Education: Weißensee Arts Academy
- Occupations: Artist, illustrator
- Spouse: Jean Weidt
- Children: Michael; Andreas

Ursula Wendorff-Weidt (6 August 1919 – 23 September 2000) was a German artist and illustrator who, in the words of one admiring obituary writer, "shaped people's living spaces as art spaces with brush and pencil for half a century", especially in Berlin.

== Life ==
Ursula Wendorff was born in Berlin-Moabit, a district of west-central Berlin. She studied between 1937 and 1943 at the "Meisterschule für Graphik" (art college) in Berlin, while also, at one stage taking evening classes in art with Otto Nagel. Nagel had already established a reputation as an artist and teacher, but he was also known to be a former Communist activist and was regarded with suspicion by the government Following his release from Camp Sachsenhausen in 1937, banned from teaching, so Wendorff was not permitted to describe herself as his "Meisterschulerin" (loosely, "star pupil") of Otto Nagel till after 1945. Her illegal art classes with the maestro took place in the back room of a pub which also housed a small "whores' room" (one-room brothel) which had the advantage that it virtually excluded any possibility of an official visit from "the authorities". Between 1946 and 1951 she studied at the Academy for Visual and Applied Arts in Berlin-Weissensee where she was taught by Werner Klemke, Ernst Rudolf Vogenauer and Eva Schwimmer.

By this time she was based in the eastern part of Berlin, which since 1945 had been administered as part of the Soviet occupation zone (relaunched in October 1949 as the Soviet sponsored German Democratic Republic / East Germany). Ursula Wendorff's first brush with a version of fame came in 1950. Three days before the Berlin Palace (already badly degraded by Anglo-American bombing) was blown up on the orders of the party, she produced her "Schloßvandalismus" ("Palace Vandalism") cycle, thereby becoming instantly known to Berliners in general and the city authorities in particular.

Her first child, the photographer Michael Weidt, was born in February 1946, and initially brought up by his maternal grandmother while his mother concentrated on her art studies. Around 1952 Ursula Wendorff married the already well-known dancer-choreographer Jean Weidt. By this time, having received her degree in 1951, she was launching her career as a freelance artist, concentrating on producing illustrations for children's books.

Between 1952 and 1988 she produced a long succession of "movement studies" featuring her husband. This led to further studies from ballet and dance theatre and a long association with the Berlin "Comic Opera" ("Komische Oper") under its long-standing chief choreographer Tom Schilling who became a particular family friend of the Weidts.

She came to wider public attention through her watercolours, prints, pen-drawings and book illustrations. The final part of Ursula Wendorff's lengthy degree course, which was published as a children’s book in 1952 under the title "Brotfibel" (loosely, "Bread starter") which she authored. The volume's defining feature was not its text but the author's illustrations. The success of the little book with East German readers and their parents formed the basis for her professional career. Between 1952 and 1989 Ursula Wendorff-Weidt produced approximately 2,000 book illustrations for roughly 250 works. She provided illustrations for a range of world classics which the authorities deemed worthy to be republished in East Germany. These included works by Balzac, Brecht, Gogol, Gorki and Maupassant. What many of these mainly classical nineteenth century writers had in common was a propensity to view the rapidly expanding middle class society of nineteenth century Europe in a less than flattering light. Much the same judgment can readily be applied to the two great German late nineteenth century classics by Theodor Fontane which appeared in new East German editions with illustrations by Wendorff-Weidt: Irrungen, Wirrungen and Effi Briest. Her richly inventive technique employed a combination of etching, woodcut printing and lithography. Commentators commended the sensitivity with which she adapted her technique according to the characters and milieux created or evoked by each author. Most of her book-illustration commissions came from or through the youth publisher Neues Leben or, in respect of the re-issued classics, the venerable publishing firm of Rütten & Loening in East Berlin.

== Memberships ==
Ursula Wendorff-Weid twas a member of the Association of Visual Artists ("Verband Bildender Künstler") till 1990. (This was a virtual inescapable prerequisite for any successful career in the German Democratic Republic.) In 1991 she became a member of the Brandenburg Association of Visual Artists, a post-unification successor oergansation of artists in the newly relaunched state of Brandenburg.

== Celebration and recognition (selection) ==
- 1956: Regional arts prize for Karl-Marx-Stadt
- 1959: Prize for Illustrations from the East German Ministry for the arts (MfK)
- 1975: Pablo Neruda Medal
- 1976: Theodor Fontane prize (Potsdam)
- 1976: Johannes R. Becher medal in silver
- 1979: East German Medal for Meritorious Service
