= Olga Brandt-Knack =

German politician (1885–1978)

Olga Brandt-Knack (born Olga Brandt: 29 June 1885 – 1 August 1978) was a Hamburg dancer, choreographer and dance teacher. She was also politically engaged, having joined the Social Democratic Party in 1918. Her career at the Hamburg State Opera was abruptly terminated in 1933 after the new government decided she was "politically unreliable". During the ensuing twelve years she was kept under surveillance by the security services and temporarily arrested by them. She supported herself during this period by working as an appointments clerk in the medical sector. After 1945, by which time she was aged 60, she rejoined the (no longer outlawed) Social Democratic Party and turned to city politics, serving between 1946 and 1953 as a high-profile member of the "Hamburgische Bürgerschaft" ("Hamburg Parliament").

== Life ==
Olga Brandt was born in Hamburg. Her dancing career began, when she was ten, at the children's dance school of the Hamburg State Theatre (as the city's State Opera was known at that time). She was a solo dancer by 1907 and became, in 1922, the leading ballerina of the ballet company. With a training in classical ballet and Expressionist dance, she was a member of the Hamburg Theatre company between 1900 and 1932. She participated in numerous foreign tours, guesting with her group in places such as Stockholm, Copenhagen, The Hague/Scheveningen and Lille. In 1908 she founded the "Deutsche Tänzerbund" (loosely, "German Dancers' Association"), after which she quickly emerged as a public spokeswoman on behalf of her fellow professionals. 1908 had been the year in which the constitutional prohibition on female membership of political parties - already enforced with varying degrees of effectiveness in different parts of Germany - was formally lifted, but it was only in 1918, in the aftermath of the disastrous war, that Olga Brandt joined the Social Democratic Party ("Sozialdemokratische Partei Deutschlands" / SPD). Alongside her party membership, she worked between 1918 and 1933 as an arts policy consultant ("kulturpolitische Referentin") to the "Genossenschaft Deutscher Bühnen-Angehöriger" (GDBA / loosely "Co-operative of German stage performers and workers"). It was also in, or shortly after, 1918 that she teamed up with the actor Adolf Johannsson to set up a "Workers' Speech and Movement Chorus" ("Arbeiter-Sprech- und Bewegungschor"). Later, in 1932, she joined with Lola Rogge (and others), to form the "Vereinigung Tanz" ("Dance Association") in Hamburg. On the national stage 1932 was a year of intensifying political polarisation and deadlock: at the Hamburg State Opera Olga Brandt-Knack lost her position as lead ballerina on account of her political activities.

On 26 February 1920 Olga Brandt married Andreas Knack. It was now that her name became "Olga Brandt-Knack". Andreas Knack was a physician and later became director of the Asklepios Klinik Barmbek (hospital) in the city. It is not clear how long the marriage lasted, but it was over by 1928, which was the year in which Knack married his second wife.

In January 1933 the National Socialists took power and lost no time in transforming Germany into a one-party dictatorship. With political party membership now illegal (other than membership of the National Socialist Party), she terminated her party membership. Olga Brandt-Knack's record as an active SPD member nevertheless led to her being classified as "politically unreliable". The Hamburg State Opera terminated her employment and she was obliged to give up the dance school she was running. She was later placed under surveillance by the security services and, on at least one occasion, briefly arrested. Unable to work professionally, she now, like her sister, took a job as a surgery appointments clerk till 1942. Between 1942 and the war's end in 1945 she moved out of the city and lived quietly with friends in the countryside.

She rejoined the SPD in 1945. From 1948 she also worked as an advisor on women's issues to the Gewerkschaft Kunst (confederation of determinedly independent arts related trades unions). She was, in addition, one of those who re-founded The Falcons, a socialist youth organisation that had originated in 1904 but then been banned during the Hitler years.

Between 30 October 1946 and 1 November 1953, Olga Brandt-Knack served as an SPD member of the "Hamburgische Bürgerschaft" ("Hamburg Parliament"). After that, till 1961, she served as deputy head of the city's police authority.
