= Adolf Zika =

Czech photographer (born 1972)

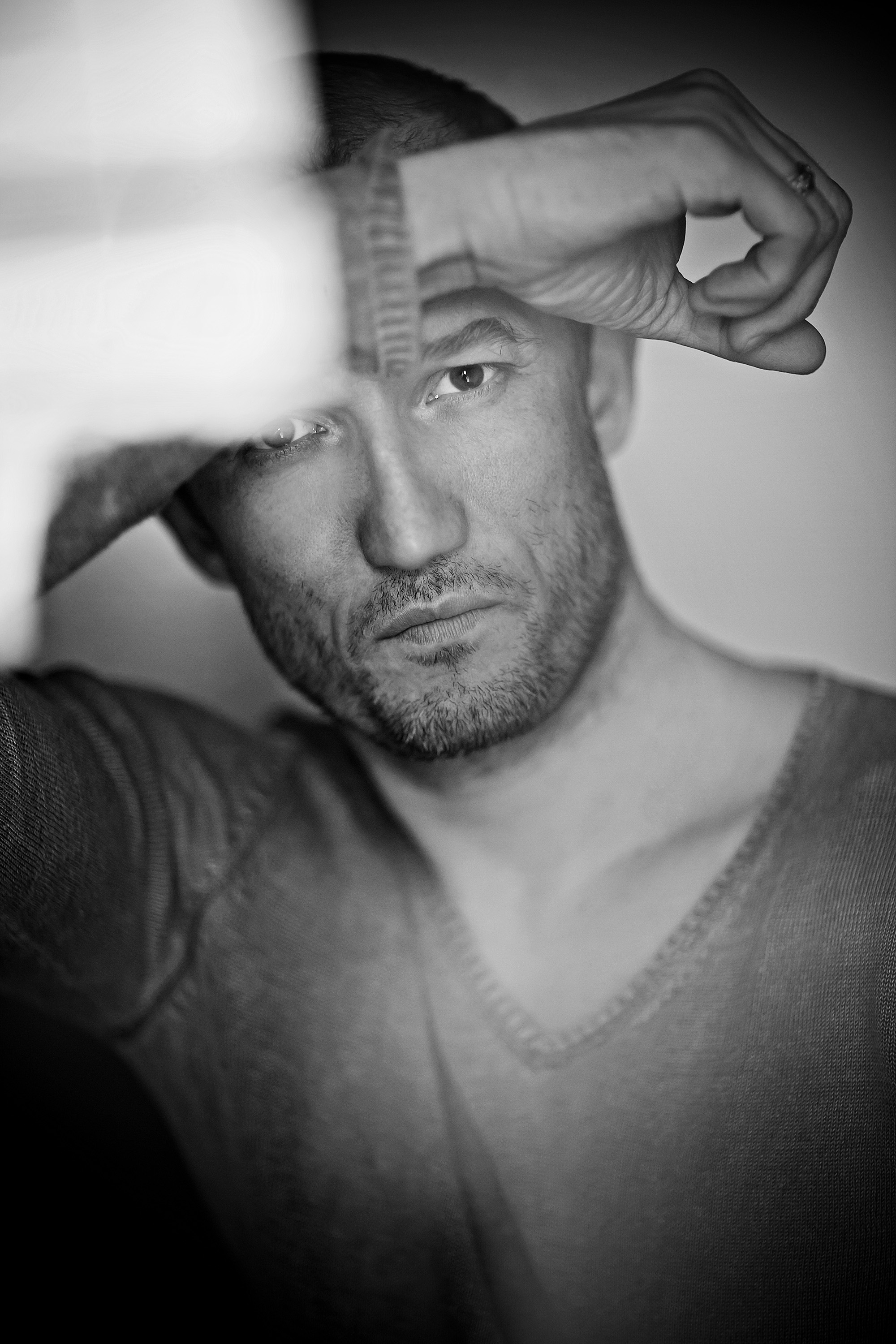
- Born: 21 July 1972 (age 53); Prachatice, Czechoslovakia (Now Czech Republic)
- Known for: Photography

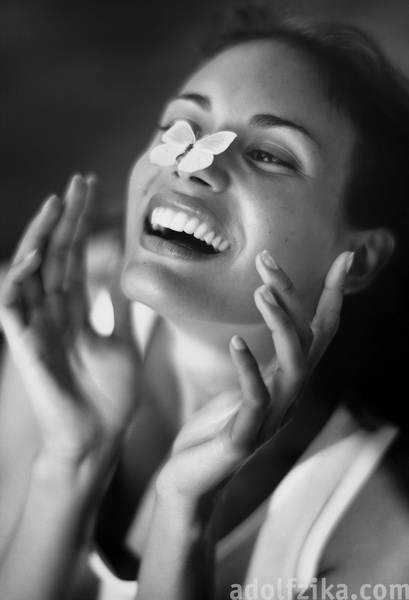
Milada, 2000

Adolf Zika (born 21 July 1972) is a Czech photographer.

== Early life ==
Zika was born in Prachatice, Czechoslovakia (now Czech Republic) in 1972. He graduated from secondary pedagogical school, and in 1988 became a member of the Center for Elite Sports in Prague. He won the title of Junior Champion of the country in judo, and earned a bronze medal in the European Junior Tournament in Vienna. In 1990, he traveled to Budo University in Katsura, Japan, where he trained under the best judo fighters in the world. On his return, he quit his judo career without any official explanation.

In the following years, Zika composed music, toured and organized various projects. In 1993, he was the guitarist and songwriter for the hardcore band Serious Music.

== Career ==
Zika took up photography in 1994, and a year later won first place in the sports category of the Czech Press Photo Contest. In 1996, he worked for a German travel agency in Cologne. Following this, the fashion label Pietro Filipi selected him as their main photographer. In the spring of 1997, Zika opened his own studio in Prague, began shooting fashion and commercial photography, and received his first large commissions. He began working on catalogs for fashion, creating calendars and working on commissions in Australia, Barbados, Hawaii, the Dominican Republic and other locations. He worked regularly for Playboy, where he photographed many of their covers. In 1999, he formed the film and production company ZIPO film. In autumn 2000, he was selected among six photographers to represent the Leica Camera brand at photokina 2000 in Cologne, and was included in their worldwide calendar. He was the author of the largest printed project of 2000, involving the cooperation of 120 photographers from the Czech Republic and four other countries. The result was The Last Book of the Century, One Day in the Life of the Czech Republic. A year later, Zika was included in the book of personalities for Czech commercial and fashion photography.

Since 2001, he has directed over two dozen television commercials, and worked on a feature-length film as a producer. In the same year, he began long-term cooperation with the mobile operator Orange SA. For Orange Slovakia, he created their entire re-branding campaign in South Africa. In 2002, he was among the bestselling Czech artists at Paris Photo in the Louvre, where he represented the Leica Gallery Prague. He also won a tender to be the photographer for the commercial television station TV Nova, creating the photographic concept and creative promotional visuals for all its programs. He worked for the Czech Ministry of Foreign Affairs to prepare the official book for the Czech Republic's entrance into the EU. In 2003, he signed a contract with the publisher Presco Group for an annual calendar of his work to be distributed worldwide.

In September 2004, his photographs were again on display at the photokina 2004 international exhibition in Cologne, this time in the Olympus E-system Gallery. His photographs were later displayed at the Black and White Past and Present gallery, organized as part of Interkamera 2006, featuring three classic Czech photographers (František Drtikol, Václav Chochola and Josef Sudek) and three representatives from the current generation (Jan Saudek, Robert Vano and Zika). In summer 2006, with the support of Hasselblad and Leica, Zika took photographs for his planned publication 6 Days and 24 Hours of Le Mans, a non-traditional conception of the 24 hours of Le Mans endurance race.

In 2007 Adolf Zika directed a full-length documentary film Jan Saudek - V pekle svých vášní, ráj v nedohlednu, about the photographer Jan Saudek.

In 2008, he made a feature-length documentary film about the 24 Hours of Le Mans race, entitled Le Mans Phenomenon. The film was later included in the Official Selection and screened at the 28th edition (2010) of the Milano International FICTS Festival of Sport, Movies and TV.

In 2009, Zika published One Year of My Life in 3285 Pictures, in co-operation with Leica, a photography project illustrates a year of his life with nine photographs a day. As an extension of this idea, in the same year he founded the web project Week of Life, a documentary project which aims to create the largest photo library of humanity.

The following year, he directed the short documentary film Tichá Vášeň ("Silent Passion").

In October 2010, he published another book, In The Shadow of Light, featuring portraits and landscapes as well as the still predominant artistic nude photography.

In February 2012, Zika was awarded the METRO Zlatá pecka 2011 award for the TV spot "Anthem", which he directed and created for Mountfield a.s. Later that year, he directed a feature-length documentary film, composed of collected footage sent by the Czech public, entitled Země česká, Domov Tvůj! ("The Czech Land, Your Home!"), created in co-production with Czech TV.

== Personal life ==
In June 2004, Zika was arrested and remanded in custody for three months in connecting with an alleged sex trafficking operation centred around the Prague branch of the Slovak ELI modelling agency, before later being acquitted at trial.

He has been married twice, and has three children.

== Awards ==
- 1995 1st Prize Czech Press Photo
- 2000 Leica Academy Germany Awards
- 2008 Glass Eye Award (Eurofest Montreal) - best documentary film Jan Saudek - Trapped by His Passions, No Hope for Rescue
- 2011 METRO Zlatá pecka

== Books by Adolf Zika ==
- Cirkus, 1996
- The Last Book of the Century, 2000
- Woman, 2005
- 6 DAYS AND 24 HOURS OF LE MANS, 2006
- Luxurious Luminescence, 2006
- ONE YEAR OF MY LIFE, 2009
- In the Shadow of Light, 2010
