= Bored Panda =

Lithuanian website

- Image of the Bored Panda homepage in April 2024
- Format: Online
- Founder: Tomas Banišauskas
- Founded: 2009
- Country: Lithuania
- Website: boredpanda.com

Bored Panda is a Lithuanian website that publishes articles about "entertaining and amusing news". The majority of its articles are repackaged user-generated content from social media platforms such as Reddit, Instagram and Twitter. It was founded in 2009 by Tomas Banišauskas, who was then a business administration student at Vilnius University.

As of November 2017, the site had 41 employees. It makes most of its revenue from the advertisements on the site. LRT has described Bored Panda as a "Lithuanian success story".

== History ==
Bored Panda was founded in 2009 by Tomas Banišauskas, a Vilnius University student studying business administration. According to Banišauskas, there was a "serious offer" to buy the company from a businessperson listed on the "Forbes' 100 rich list".

== Copied content and criticism ==
Bored Panda functions primarily as a content aggregator, sourcing a significant portion of its viral material by repurposing popular posts from social media platforms such as Reddit. The site typically compiles these user-generated threads, images, and stories into listicles, often framing them with its own commentary or context. While this strategy allows the platform to rapidly curate trending topics and maximise reach, it frequently draws criticism from original creators and online communities who argue that the site often fails to provide adequate attribution or obtain explicit permission before commercialising content that was originally intended for community discussion.

== Popularity ==
According to NewsWhip, Bored Panda's Facebook page received over 30 million likes, shares, comments, and reactions in October 2017, more than any other English-language news website that month. Bored Panda also reported that it was viewed by 116 million unique visitors that month.

In November 2017, Wired reported that the site had flourished despite Facebook cracking down on attention-grabbing clickbait headlines, a change that had made controversial political news much more successful on the platform. Banišauskas attributes the success of his site to his belief the site publishes a small number of higher-quality articles and avoids clickbait headlines.

== Reception ==
Wired contributor Evan Griffith described Bored Panda as "...a throwback to when the Internet was less an addictive, stress-inducing reflection of the ugliness of modern life, and more a place to kill time when we were bored."
