= Jerome Andrews =

American dancer and choreographer

- Born: 1908; Plaistow, New Hampshire, United States
- Died: October 26, 1992 (aged 83–84); Paris, France
- Occupation(s): Dancer, choreographer

Jerome Andrews (1908 – October 26, 1992) was an American dancer and choreographer. He is remembered as a pioneer of modern dance in France.

== Biography ==
=== Early life ===
Jerome Andrews was born in Plaistow, New Hampshire, in 1908. He was educated at the Cornish College of the Arts in Seattle. He was then trained in modern dance by Martha Graham, as well as Ruth St. Denis, Doris Humphrey and Hanya Holm. He was also influenced by Mary Wigman.

=== Career ===
He started his career as a dancer in Paris in the early 1930s, where he was a dancer in Rhapsody in Blue by George Gershwin at Le Colisee. He also danced in London, where he was choreographed by Sigurd Leeder for Prometheus. At the same time, he also worked as a dancer of ballet and modern dance from 1931 to 1937 at the Radio City Music Hall in New York City. While working at the Radio City Music Hall, Andrews met ballet dancer Edith Allard, who later credited him with inspiring her to pursue a career in Paris. At the same time, he worked as a dance teacher and assistant to Alyse Bentley. He also worked with his former teacher, Martha Graham.

He also worked as a choreographer in New York. For example, he choreographed Maurice Ravel's The Waltz, which was performed at the Radio City Music Hall.

He moved back to Paris permanently in the 1952, where he worked as a dance teacher and choreographer. A year later, in 1953, he established Les Compagnons de la Danse, a dance company. Some of his most renowned students were Dominique Dupuy and Francoise Dupuy. A decade later, in 1964, he formed the Jerome Andrews Dance Company. According to the Los Angeles Times, he pioneered modern dance in France, where ballet was a more popular form of dance in the 1950s.

=== Death ===
He died on October 26, 1992, in Paris, at the age of eighty-four.
