= Françoise Dupuy =

French dancer (1925–2022)

- Born: Françoise Michaud; 6 February 1925; Lyon, France
- Died: 15 September 2022 (aged 97); Paris, France
- Occupations: Dancer; Choreographer

Françoise Dupuy (French pronunciation: [fʁɑ̃swaz dypɥi]; née Michaud; 6 February 1925 – 15 September 2022) was a French dancer and choreographer. She was married to fellow dancer and choreographer Dominique Dupuy.

Born in Lyon, France, Dupuy took her first dance lessons at the Lyon Opera when she was five years old. In 1946, Dupuy joined Jean Weidt's company in Paris, where she met Dominique.

Dupuy was an iconic choreographer since the 1940s. She also taught as a teacher. In the mid-1980s, Dupuy was an inspector at the French Ministry of Culture. She was a key figure in the development of modern and contemporary dance in France. Besides dance, Dupuy was also passionate about music, painting, and theater.

Dupuy died on 15 September 2022, at the age of 97.

== Written works ==
- Une danse à l’œuvre (2001)
- On ne danse jamais seul. Écrits sur la danse (2012)
- Album (2017)
- L'éveil et l'initiation à la danse (2017)
- Deux à danser
