= Dominique Dupuy (dancer) =

French dancer and choreographer (1930–2024)

- Born: 31 October 1930; Paris, France
- Died: 1 May 2024 (aged 93)
- Occupations: Dancer, choreographer, author
- Spouse: Françoise Dupuy (m. 1951; died 2022)
- Relatives: Marcel Michaud (father-in-law)

Dominique Dupuy (31 October 1930 – 1 May 2024) was a French dancer and choreographer of modern dance. He is best known as a pioneer of modern dance in France. Additionally, he ran a choreographic centre as well as an annual dance festival in Provence.

== Biography ==
=== Early life ===
Dominique Dupuy was born on 31 October 1930 in Paris. He was first trained as an eight-year-old by choreographer Jean Weidt and later by Doryta Brown. He was then trained by the American choreographer Jerome Andrews. During the Second World War, he left Paris for rural France, and he learned how to act. Shortly after the war, he resumed lessons with Weidt, and took lessons in classical dance with Olga Preobrajenska, Nicolas Zverev, and Merce Cunningham. Additionally, he took more acting lessons with Charles Dullin and Marcel Marceau.

=== Career ===
He started his career as a dancer for his former teacher, Jean Weidt, where he met his future wife. Shortly afterwards, as Weidt returned to Germany, he established a dance company with his wife called Les Ballets Modernes de Paris. Together, they have choreographed many dance performances. Their dances have been inspired by Vaslav Nijinsky, Deryk Mendel, Michel Fokine and Régine Chopinot. One of their main dancers has been José Montalvo.

Later, they also established the Mas de la danse, a choreographic center in Fontvieille, Bouches-du-Rhône, in the South of France. On top of dance performances, they also organized conferences on dance open to the public. Additionally, they established the annual Les Baux-de-Provence Dance Festival in Les Baux-de-Provence.

He has also taught dance and practised as a choreographer on his own. For example, he served as the Director of the Dance Department at the Institute of Musical and Choreographic Pedagogy from 1991 to 1995. More recently, in 2012–2013, he choreographed Act Without Words I and Act Without Words II, two short plays by Samuel Beckett. The first one was performed at the Théâtre national de Chaillot in Paris.

He has been called a pioneer of modern dance in France.

=== Personal life ===
He was married to Françoise Dupuy, the daughter of art critic Marcel Michaud (1898–1958), and also a dancer, since 1951. They met during a dance class taught by Jean Weidt. Françoise died in September 2022. Dupuy died on 1 May 2024, at the age of 93.

== Dances ==
- En pure perte (1969)
- Cercle dans tous ses états (1978)
- En vol (1983)
- L'Homme debout, il... (1995)
- Opus 67-97 (1997)
- L'Estran (2005)
- Le Regard par-dessus le col (2007)
- Acte sans paroles I (2011)
- Acte sans paroles II (2014)

== Bibliography ==
- Dominique Dupuy, Frédéric Pouillaude, Daniel Dobbels, Claude Rabant. Danse et politique. Démarche artistique et contexte historique (Centre national de la danse, 2003).
- Dominique Dupuy. Quant à la danse (2004).
- Dominique Dupuy. La Sagesse du danseur (Jean-Claude Béhar, 2005).
- Dominique Dupuy. Danse contemporaine: pratique et théorie Marsyas, écrits pour la danse. (Images en manœuvres, 2008).
