= Rangsdorf =

- Municipality
- Coat of arms

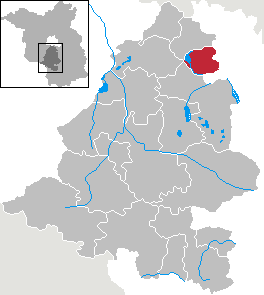
- Location of Rangsdorf within Teltow-Fläming district
- Interactive map of Rangsdorf
- Location within Germany Location within Brandenburg
- Coordinates: 52°17′N 13°26′E
- Country: Germany
- State: Brandenburg
- District: Teltow-Fläming
- Subdivisions: 3 Ortsteile

Government
  - Mayor (2019–27): Klaus Rocher (FDP)

Area
  - Total: 33.72 km^{2} (13.02 sq mi)
- Elevation: 36 m (118 ft)

Population (2025-12-31)
  - Total: 11,768
  - Density: 349.0/km^{2} (903.9/sq mi)
- Time zone: UTC+01:00 (CET)
  - Summer (DST): UTC+02:00 (CEST)
- Postal codes: 15834
- Dialling codes: 033708
- Vehicle registration: TF
- Website: www.rangsdorf.de

Rangsdorf is a municipality in the district of Teltow-Fläming in Brandenburg in Germany. It has an airfield [up to 1940 a genuine commercial airport] from where on 20 July 1944 Claus Schenk Graf von Stauffenberg took off on his fateful attempt to assassinate German leader Adolf Hitler at his military headquarters in East Prussia, the Wolfsschanze (Wolf's Lair).

== Demography ==
Development of Population since 1875 within Current Boundaries (Blue Line: Population; Dotted Line: Comparison to Population Development of Brandenburg state; Grey Background: Time of National Socialist rule; Red Background: Time of Communist rule)

Recent Population Development and Projections (Population Development before Census 2011 (blue line); Recent Population Development according to the Census in Germany in 2011 (blue bordered line); Official projections for 2005-2030 (yellow line); for 2020-2030 (green line); for 2017-2030 (scarlet line)

Rangsdorf: Population development
within the current boundaries

Year	Pop.	±% p.a.
1875	1,079	—
1890	1,084	+0.03%
1910	1,303	+0.92%
1925	1,400	+0.48%
1933	2,267	+6.21%
1939	4,986	+14.04%
1946	5,907	+2.45%
1950	6,166	+1.08%
1964	6,294	+0.15%
1971	6,846	+1.21%
1981	6,483	−0.54%
1985	6,220	−1.03%
1989	6,001	−0.89%
1990	5,905	−1.60%
1991	5,808	−1.64%

Year	Pop.	±% p.a.
1992	5,863	+0.95%
1993	5,961	+1.67%
1994	6,050	+1.49%
1995	6,297	+4.08%
1996	6,532	+3.73%
1997	7,052	+7.96%
1998	7,480	+6.07%
1999	7,912	+5.78%
2000	8,303	+4.94%
2001	8,581	+3.35%
2002	8,818	+2.76%
2003	8,977	+1.80%
2004	9,236	+2.89%
2005	9,545	+3.35%
2006	9,745	+2.10%

Year	Pop.	±% p.a.
2007	10,002	+2.64%
2008	10,190	+1.88%
2009	10,372	+1.79%
2010	10,515	+1.38%
2011	10,444	−0.68%
2012	10,498	+0.52%
2013	10,609	+1.06%
2014	10,824	+2.03%
2015	10,848	+0.22%
2016	11,163	+2.90%
2017	11,279	+1.04%
2018	11,309	+0.27%
2019	11,369	+0.53%
2020	11,423	+0.47%
