= Biotronik =

Biomedical technology company headquartered in Berlin, Germany

BIOTRONIK SE & Co. KG
- BIOTRONIK current logo and wordmark
- Type: Limited partnership
- Industry: Cardiovascular Medical equipment, Medical technology
- Founded: 1963; 63 years ago, in Germany
- Founders: Max Schaldach, Otto Franke
- Headquarters: Woermannkehre 1, 12359, Berlin, Germany
- Number of locations: Manufacturing Germany, Switzerland, USA, Singapore
- Area served: Worldwide
- Key people: Holger Krumel CEO, Dr. Andreas Hecker
- Products: Medical devices
- Website: www.BIOTRONIK.com

Biotronik (BIOTRONIK SE & Co. KG; Biotronik Worldwide) is a limited partnership multi-national medical device company, headquartered in Berlin, Germany.

The company offers equipment for diagnosis, treatment, and therapy support in the areas of cardiac rhythm management, monitoring, electrophysiology, and neuromodulation.

Biotronik employs more than 9,000 people worldwide in over 100 countries.

Biotronik has paid a handful of settlements to government agencies for kickback schemes to cardiologists to induce the use of their devices.

== History ==
BIOTRONIK began with the development of the first German implantable pacemaker (Biotronik IP-03) in 1963. The pacemaker was developed at Technische Universität Berlin by physicist Professor. Dr. Max Schaldach (1936–2001), a professor of biomedical technology at the Friedrich-Alexander-University of Erlangen-Nuremberg (FAU), and electrical engineer Otto Franke.

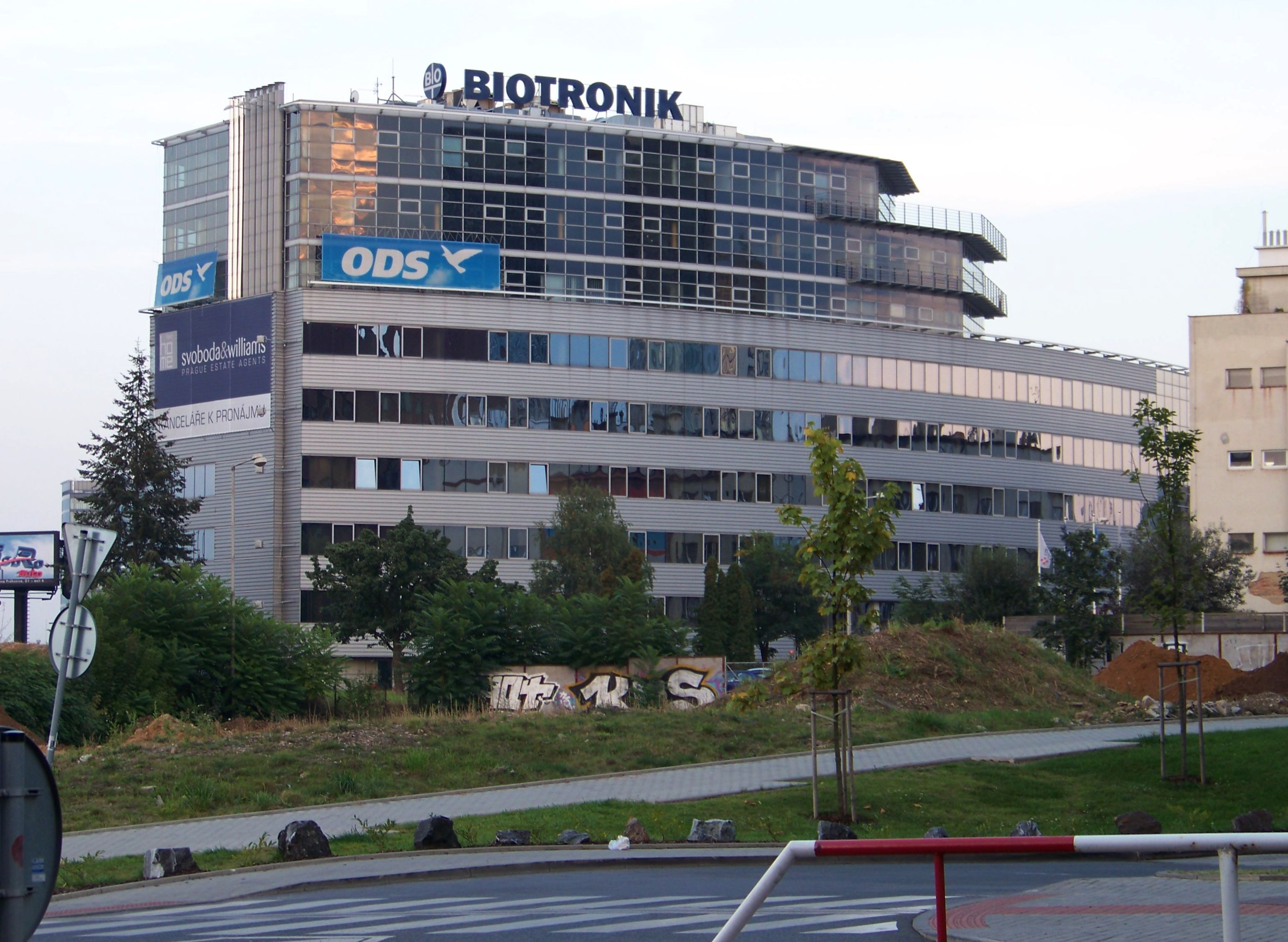
BIOTRONIK in the Czech Republic, 2011.

In 1994 and 1995 respectively, BIOTRONIK began offering a full spectrum of electrophysiology products and vascular intervention products. With Philos, the company has offered a complete pacemaker family with telemetry since 2000, when it received CE Mark approval for the product, and also successfully implanted the first pacemaker with Home Monitoring (remote patient monitoring). Home Monitoring has shown significant clinical benefits, including over a 50% reduction in mortality of heart failure patients.

In 2011, BIOTRONIK was the subject of an investigation by the United States Department of Justice (US DoJ) into payments made to doctors in Nevada, United States, who use the company's products in their practices. The case was settled in 2014. In 2013, a similar investigation began and was settled involving payments to physicians in Oregon.

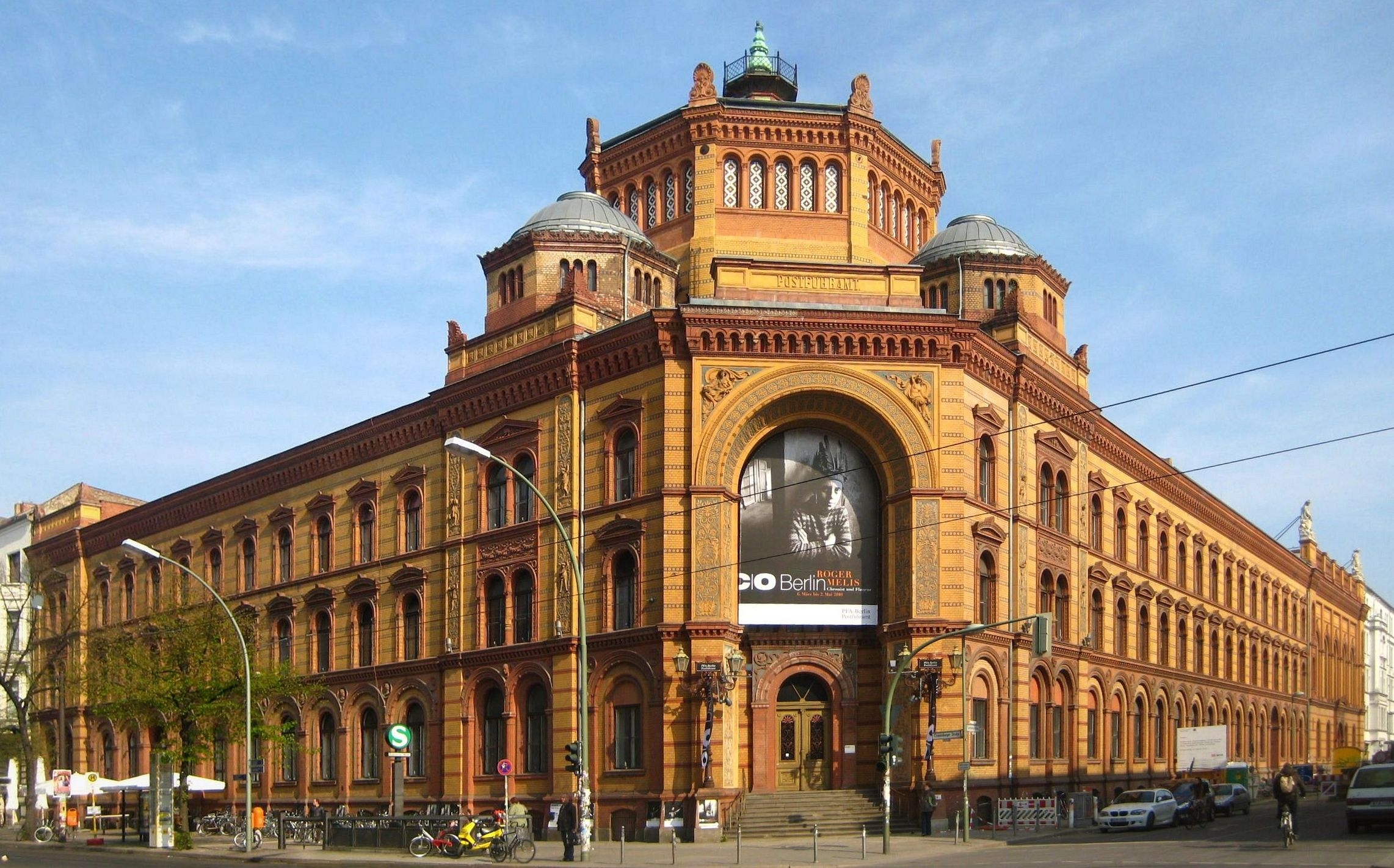
The former Postfuhramt, acquired in 2012 by BIOTRONIK.

In 2012, the company acquired the old Postfuhramt, a historical brick postal building on Berlin's Oranienburger Strasse in the sub-neighbourhood of Spandauer Vorstadt, in the district of Mitte.

Indicated to treat peripheral artery disease in the lower limbs, BIOTRONIK released the Passeo-18 Lux in 2014 as the first peripheral drug-coated balloon. The year following, CardioMessenger Smart was launched, its new patient device for Home Monitoring, and BioMonitor 2, the second-generation insertable cardiac monitor.

In February 2016, BIOTRONIK Inc. opened an Education and Innovation Center, a training facility and meeting location in New York City.

In 2023, Biotronik entered the neuromodulation market with the FDA approval of its Prospera™ Spinal Cord Stimulation (SCS) system,. The company simultaneously launched a new business segment, Biotronik Neuro, positioning the firm within the growing non‑opioid chronic pain therapy market.

In February 2025, Biotronik announced a major strategic shift to concentrate on active implantable devices and digital health technologies, including artificial intelligence, remote patient monitoring, and connected‑care platforms. As part of this transition, the company agreed to divest its Vascular Intervention (VI) business to Teleflex, a deal expected to close in 2025. The transaction was completed earlier than anticipated and transferred nearly all of Biotronik’s coronary and peripheral interventional product portfolio—including the Pantera Lux drug‑coated balloon catheter, the PK Papyrus covered coronary stent, and the ultrathin Orsiro Mission drug‑eluting stent—to Teleflex.

== Awards ==
In 2007, BIOTRONIK was given the EuroPCR 2007 Novelty Award for its innovative absorbable metal stents (AMS) by the European Association of Percutaneous Cardiovascular Interventions (EAPCI). In 2009, it was nominated for the German Future Prize for its Home Monitoring system by the German Federal Ministry of Education and Research. In 2010, BIOTRONIK endowed the Berlin-Brandenburg Academy of Sciences and Humanities' Technical Science Prize, first awarded to Till Schlösser. The CARDIOSTIM Innovation Award for Practice Improvement was granted to BIOTRONIK for its MRI AutoDetect.

== Partnerships ==
BIOTRONIK collaborates with the EPIC Alliance, a global network of female electrophysiologists. The alliance aims to enhance collaboration and support for women in the field of electrophysiology.

In October 2025, Biotronik and the University of Sydney entered a three‑year collaboration to co‑develop digital and connected cardiac‑care solutions. The partnership focuses on remote patient monitoring, AI‑enabled clinical decision support, and scalable digital tools aimed at improving care delivery, particularly for patients in remote or underserved regions. The program will be developed and tested in real‑world clinical settings through 2028.

== Criticism ==
In 2014, Biotronik faced allegations regarding kickback payments to cardiologists, leading to a settlement of nearly five million dollars. Currently, another case is ongoing in the California Central District Court. Additionally,

In a landmark case from New Mexico in 2016, a jury found Biotronik negligent for unnecessarily implanting a pacemaker in Tommy Sowards due to an alleged conspiracy involving the company, a salesman, a hospital, and a cardiologist. The lawsuit exposed a scheme where Biotronik paid kickbacks to the cardiologist, significantly inflating his earnings per procedure. Despite later advice from medical professionals that the pacemaker was not needed, it could not be removed without risking heart damage. As a result, the jury awarded Sowards $2.3 million in compensatory damages and $65 million in punitive damages.

Biotronik is under investigation in the Netherlands, with inquiries initiated in autumn 2020. This investigation, reported by Der Spiegel and the Dutch newspaper NRC Handelsblad, focuses on suspicions that medical specialists received millions of euros to promote Biotronik products. Over ten residences have been searched, and assets worth 3.1 million euros belonging to medical specialists have been confiscated. Biotronik has not provided comments on these allegations.

In July 2022, Biotronik resolved a prolonged legal dispute in the USA by agreeing to a multimillion dollar settlement. The case involved allegations from two whistleblowers, who were former independent sales representatives, concerning a kick-back scheme. According to the whistleblowers the scheme entailed treating cardiologists to lavish dinners, winery tours, baseball games, strip club visits, and golf outings, sometimes including their spouses or employees. Additionally, cardiologists were allegedly compensated for making brief appearances at international conferences or provided with business class flights. Another aspect of the scheme involved a trainee program where Biotronik employees observed cardiologists during the implantation of ICDs, for which the cardiologists were paid $400. Despite concerns raised by the compliance department, the payments continued. The alleged kick-back system, intended to encouraged the use of Biotronik products, occurred between 2013 and 2021. Although Biotronik denied the allegations, they settled with the US authorities without admitting guilt, paying nearly $13 million.
