= Amerika Haus Berlin =

Coordinates: 52°30′24″N 13°19′50″E

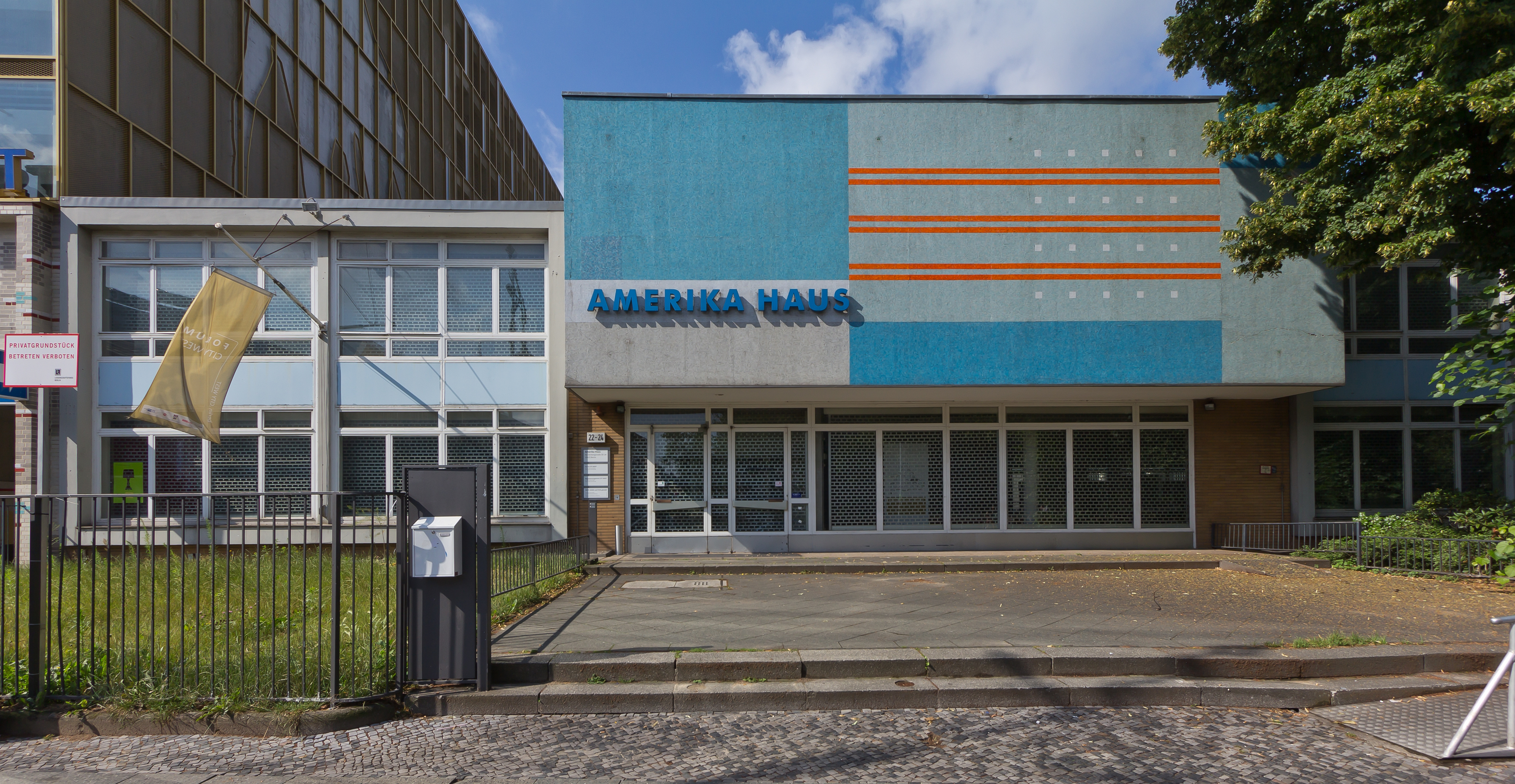
Amerika-Haus in Berlin, 2012

The Amerika Haus Berlin is an institution that was developed following the end of the World War II, to provide an opportunity for German citizens to learn more about American culture and politics, and engage in discussion and debate on the transatlantic relationship. Run by the American government until 2006, Berlin's Amerika Haus is one of many Amerika Häuser located across Germany.

On September 25, 2006, the Amerika Haus Berlin was officially handed back to the city of Berlin, and its doors were closed to the general public until 2014.

== Development ==
The destruction of libraries, bookstores, and other collections of literary material both before and during the second World War led to the emergence, post-1945, of a need for diverse reading material within Germany. At this time the American armed forces within German cities established "American Reading Rooms" for local German citizens. What began as a collection of books and other material from American soldiers returning home grew into a number of extensive library collections.

The US government began to support these initiatives in the late 1940s. The locations became officially known as "Amerika Häuser" and started receiving financial support through the US military and the newly created US Information Agency (USIA). The libraries grew into much larger establishments that included auditoriums, classrooms, and other exhibition spaces for film screenings, concerts, book readings, and panel discussions. German citizens, both young and old, were able to visit the institutions freely to learn more about American culture and politics and explore opportunities for academic, and other exchange programs with the US.

The original goal of the "Amerika Häuser" were not to serve as platforms for propaganda, but to provide access to American culture, in particular through literature, and help to combat anti-American sentiment that had been encouraged by certain political elements since the early 1930s.

During the Cold War the "Amerika Häuser" gained an increasingly important symbolic role, representing American freedom and democracy abroad. In addition to the cultural and political dialogue that took place within the buildings during this time they became locations for protests against American foreign policy (during the Vietnam War, for example) and for displays of solidarity (following September 11). The Amerika Häuser across Germany are illustrations of the special relationship between Germany and the United States and the importance of cultural diplomacy in international affairs.

== Amerika Haus in Berlin ==
The Amerika Haus Berlin has its origins in a passport office in the Berlin district of Schöneberg that was established immediately after the end of the War. According to several accounts, one day in late 1945 a group of American military personnel returning home visited the office to donate some books, which were then displayed in the waiting room. Given that much reading material, particularly from American authors, had been destroyed either by the National Socialist regime or during the war itself, the books quickly became popular with German visitors. Military and civilian personnel responded to this demand by bringing further books to the office.

The collection of reading material had developed to such an extent that, when the passport office closed, it was decided two employees would remain behind to run a small library. The library was officially opened on February 26, 1946, with a collection of around 2,000 books. Over the next four years the library developed in both size and scope and in the summer of 1947 displayed photos of American cities and landscapes, and information about American schools and colleges. In November of that year the first lecture took place at the Amerika Haus with a Professor Wells presenting to the public on the American elections.

This was followed, one month later, by an exhibition of books written for young people by authors from across the world. Other developments that took place during this time included the playing of jazz music, which has previously been a taboo genre, in the library. During this time the library became officially known as the U.S. Information Center, and then the Amerika Haus. The first director of the Amerika Haus was Christopher Legge, who had started working there in November 1946.

== The Amerika Haus before the construction of the Berlin Wall ==
The newly named Amerika Haus was given a significant boost in 1948 by the "US Information and Educational Exchange Act", popularly known as the Smith-Mundt Act. Signed into Law by President Harry Truman on January 27, the act demonstrated a commitment the dissemination of information about America's politics and culture abroad. The activities of the Amerika Haus Berlin intensified further as a result. On June 3, 1949, the institution moved into a new and more prominent location in Schöneberg, near to Nollendorfplatz. In addition to the main library, the new building contained a library for children's books, an art studio, a periodicals division, a theatre room, and space for teaching workshops.

The theatre room offered up to five screenings of news and short films each day. Other events that were held at the new location included English language classes, a jazz club, academic lectures, music concerts, and discussion groups. A further important development that took place at this time was the establishment of additional, external reading rooms which were opened across the city as offshoots of the Amerika Haus. To increase the availability of literature the institution also organized "bookmobiles" that brought books to the more remote parts of the city, including refugee camps.

During these years the Amerika Haus Berlin was particularly popular with the citizens of East Berlin, which was under Soviet occupation and, from 1949 onwards, a socialist state represented by the Communist Party of Germany. During the blockade of West Berlin by the Soviet Union (June 1948 – May 1949) the institution and its reading rooms became increasingly valuable as a source of Western newspapers and magazines, and the film screenings attracted up to 10,000 visitors from the East every month. The building's role as a distribution centre for literature associated with capitalism gave it an increasing importance that remained over the coming decades and led to frequent political discussions on the symbolism of the institution, which was financed exclusively by the American government. The growing popularity of the Amerika Haus during these years is demonstrated by visitor numbers.

In 1946, the year Amerika Haus Berlin began as a library on Kleiststraße, the institution attracted around 6,000 visitors. This number grew to 68,000 in 1947, 207,000 in 1948, and 609,000 in 1949. By 1954 the institution was attracting almost 2 million annual visitors, with up to 2,000 book loans taking place each day.

In 1957, the institution moved from its location close to Nollendorfplatz to a new purpose-built location on Hardenbergstraße, its current site near the Berlin Zoologischer Garten railway station and the Kurfürstendamm. The new structure was completed with two stories, and had a modern look. The architect was Bruno Grimmek. There was a small yard around its front and space on either side, which made it stand out in the heavily built up commercial area surrounding it. On the front side of the structure were huge block letters, spelling out Amerika Haus, in sky blue. The official opening ceremony met with great acclaim, especially since the new building was better equipped to serve the various functions required of the institution. The library contained around 50,000 English and German books, 150 periodicals, a photo archive with 12,000 photos depicting aspects of American life, and a music section with a sheet music archive and listening stations for record collections. The lecture program consisted of around 50 to 75 lectures per year. In addition to prestigious scientists, many other famous personalities visited the building, including politicians Ernst Lemme and Willy Brandt, journalists Thilo Koch and Peter von Zahn, composers Darius Milhaud and Alexander Tcherepnin, the actor Sidney Poitier, and the writer Thornton Wilder.

The television evenings and feature film screenings were also further developed in the new building. More film screenings, workshops, theatre and dance performances, and music concerts were planned for the visitors from the East. In the vestibule and the upper floor there was space set aside for art and information exhibitions. Works from Lyonel Feininger (1962), Frank Lloyd Wright (1964), Robert Rauschenberg (1965), and a group of Native American artists (1964 and 1966) were displayed in addition to the exhibitions on the history and tradition of the US Army (1964) and the lunar photos taken by one of the space probes (1965).

== The Amerika Haus Berlin following the construction of the Berlin Wall ==
Following the construction of the Berlin Wall in 1961 the Amerika Haus Berlin became the most prominent symbol of America in Berlin. Due to the changing political situation, however, limitations were placed on the scope of its activities. From August 13, 1961, the day on which construction of the Berlin Wall began, East Berliners could no longer travel freely to West Berlin and were required to return the books they had borrowed by post. The reading rooms that had emerged across the city, which had previously been full of East Berliners, now stood almost empty and were eventually completely abandoned.

On November 5, 1961, the Amerika Haus Berlin reacted to the construction of the Berlin Wall with the opening of a permanent exhibit on the Wall and the changing political conditions. This exhibition remained in place until 1974 and informed Berliners and other visitors to Berlin about the construction, progression, and implications of the border. Many prominent guests to the city made stops to this exhibition, including actor James Stewart (July 2, 1962), author John Steinbeck (December 13, 1963), and politicians Robert F. Kennedy (Spring 1962), Heinrich Lübke (February 3, 1963), and Richard Nixon (July 23, 1963).

The emergence of student activism during the 1960s led to the Amerika Haus becoming a prominent site for protests against American foreign policy. As the most obvious representation of America in Berlin, the building was the natural target for protestors. The most controversial topic during this time was America's involvement in the Vietnam War. A number of citizens claimed that the material available in the building did not accurately reflect the situation in Vietnam and that the institution was simply a centre for American propaganda. Late one night in October 1965 a group of individuals broke into the Amerika Haus Berlin and distributed pro-communist literature in the library. Pro-communist protestors also interrupted a podium discussion in the Amerika Haus entitled "Focal Point Vietnam", although this did not prevent the institution from holding further events on Vietnam, such as a lecture entitled "Development Aid for Vietnam" that took place in February 1966.

Such displays of protest became more violent as the 1960s progressed. In February 1966 a group of around 500-1000 students gathered in front of the building for a protest against the Vietnam War. Although sanctioned by the police, they were forced to step in when students began throwing eggs at the building and the American flag. Whilst relatively tame when compared with later actions, this incident provoked a strong pro-American reaction from certain parts of the city. The newspaper Die Welt described the incident as "embarrassing", and the head of Free University of Berlin offered his support.

The Student Council at Technische Universität Berlin also sympathized with the United States and called for the creation of a scholarship that would be granted to a member of the American Peace Corps. In reaction to this outpouring of support in favor of the institution, the police launched a search for the people responsible for throwing the eggs. Two days after the demonstration the CDU, the Young Union, and the Circle of Christian-Democratic Students organized a counter-demonstration that took place in front of the Amerika Haus. Some hecklers were removed during the course of this half-hour gathering and were forcibly taken to the nearby train station Zoologischer Garten, where they were told they could get a ticket and go to the East if they were so strongly against American politics.

A few weeks later the Amerika Haus Berlin celebrated its 20th anniversary with a special ceremony, during which the incidents of the previous weeks were further discussed. The support the Berliners gave in response to the egg throwing incident clearly showed that the majority of Berliners thought positively of the institution. Even Mayor Willy Brandt, a staunch supporter of freedom of speech, spoke out against the actions of the students and offered his support.

Despite this outpouring of support, further demonstrations against American policy towards Vietnam took place. On December 20, 1967, the newly elected Mayor Klaus Schütz spoke out against the demonstrations during a lecture at the Free University. Some students who were present at the speech were angered by Mr. Schütz's words and his pro-Vietnam stance. Many of them left the event, walked to the Greek military mission and then on to the Amerika Haus where they broke windows by throwing stones and snowballs. The police were called in to stop the demonstration and save the building from further destruction.

The fragmentation of the student movement in the late 1960s led to a new phase in protests against the Amerika Haus that included further demonstrations carried out by militant and anarchist groups. On December 12, 1969, a guard in the front room of the library found a suspicious package and decided to dispose of it by throwing it out of the window. The package was later found at the nearby Zoologischer Garten station, where it was found to contain a delayed-action bomb that had malfunctioned.

The news of the invasion of Cambodia by American troops in May 1970 led to further attacks on the building. A group of about 20 people drove to the building on May 5 and smashed windows with stones, even throwing Molotov cocktails in the building. Although the guards were not allowed to use their weapons against the protestors, they were able to put out the fire.

The most violent conflict happened a few days later in reaction to the continuing war in Cambodia and the Kent State Shootings in Ohio that had left four students dead. Around 8000 protestors and 5000 policemen occupied the space in front of the building, which had been reinforced with barbed wire and other barriers due to heightened security concerns. Some of the more militant protestors tried to charge through the barriers with bottles, stones, and other weapons. The police held back the protestors with water hoses. During the incident a civil servant took out his gun and fired three shots, injuring an innocent bystander and a colleague. In total, 44 people were arrested and 231 policemen and an unknown number of demonstrators were injured.

After the turbulent and controversial events of the 1960s the role and activity of the Amerika Haus changed over the subsequent two decades. The fading of the hippie movement during the 1970s and the withdrawal of American troops from Vietnam from 1973 to 1975 ensured that no further large-scale protests took place. The building shifted its focus to the portrayal and reflection of American popular culture, as symbolized by the Hollywood film industry and pop music, which was increasingly popular worldwide.

== The Amerika Haus following the fall of the Berlin Wall ==
The Amerika Haus was an operation of the USIA for most of its history. Up until the fall of the Berlin Wall The Amerika Haus in Berlin was to a certain degree under the umbrella of the U.S. Mission in Berlin. Amerika Haus began reporting through the newly created American Embassy Office Berlin (a satellite of the Embassy in Bonn), and its Principal Officer when this new entity came into being in the early 1990s. In 1999 the USIA was merged into the State Department and as a result the Amerika Haus became an arm of the Public Diplomacy cadre of the U.S. State Department and put more firmly under the authority of the Principal Officer in Berlin. Later, in 1998, when the Embassy Office became the full-fledged Embassy newly relocated to Berlin, the Amerika Haus was more directly under the authority of the Ambassador, now resident in Berlin.

Following the peaceful revolution and the fall of the Berlin Wall in 1989 many commentators questioned the role the institution could play in a united Germany and a post-Cold War Europe. The geo-political shift that took place in 1989, however, generated a high demand for further information on US politics and culture. The Amerika Haus became a meeting place for politicians, economists, scientists, and businessmen from across Europe. Another factor in the eventual demise of the Amerika Haus were the stricter security standards of the U.S. Department's Diplomatic Security Service, as opposed to the standards of the former parent agency USIA. The location, layout and design of the Amerika Haus did not lend itself to these new standards.

The identity of the Amerika Haus as a symbol of the United States for Berliners was reaffirmed following the terrorist attacks that took place on September 11, 2001. Although they viewed events from a distance, many Berliners felt compelled to display their sympathy for the American citizens. In a public outpouring of emotion, thousands of citizens laid flowers in front of the building in a show of solidarity, a stark contrast to the events of the 1960s.

On September 25, 2006, almost 60 years after the institution had been established, the Amerika Haus Berlin was closed and the building returned to the city of Berlin by the US Ambassador William R. Timkin Jr. Following this closure, a number of organizations and individuals in civil society campaigned to revive the building. In September 2008, the doors of the Amerika Haus were reopened for an event series "How will America Vote?" and in January 2009 "Black History Month in Berlin 2009".

In 2014, the gallery C/O Berlin relocated from the Postfuhramt to the Amerika Haus, where they host photography exhibitions. In 2015, C/O Berlin was awarded the Berlin BDA Prize (Bund Deutscher Architekten) for its sensitive refurbishment and revitalization of the building.
