= Spandauer Vorstadt =

Spandauer Vorstadt Spandauer suburb, Spandauer Viertel
- sub-neighborhood
- Location within Germany
- Coordinates: 52.525278°N 13.398611°E
- Named for: Spandauer Gate

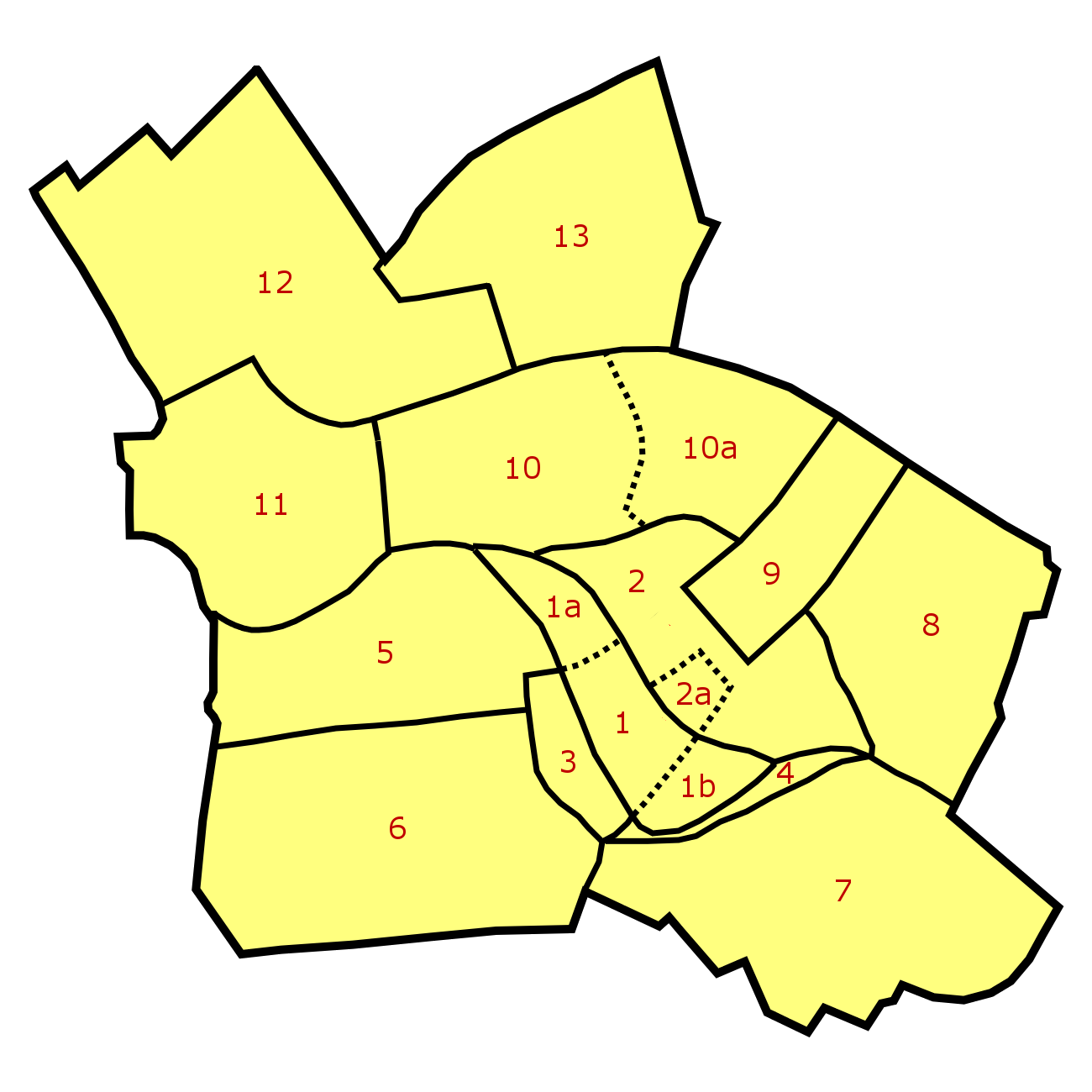
Quarters of Berlin-Mitte: Cölln (1); Museum Island (1a); Fisher Island (1b); Alt-Berlin (2); Nikolaiviertel (2a); Friedrichswerder (3); Neukölln am Wasser (4); Dorotheenstadt (5); Friedrichstadt (6); Luisenstadt (7); Stralauer Vorstadt (8); Alexanderplatz (9); Spandauer Vorstadt (10); Scheunenviertel (10a); Friedrich-Wilhelm-Stadt (11); Oranienburger Vorstadt (12); Rosenthaler Vorstadt (13)

Spandauer Vorstadt ("Spandauer suburb", formerly also called Spandauer Quarter or Spandauer Viertel) is a historic district in what is now the Mitte district of Berlin.

== Geography ==
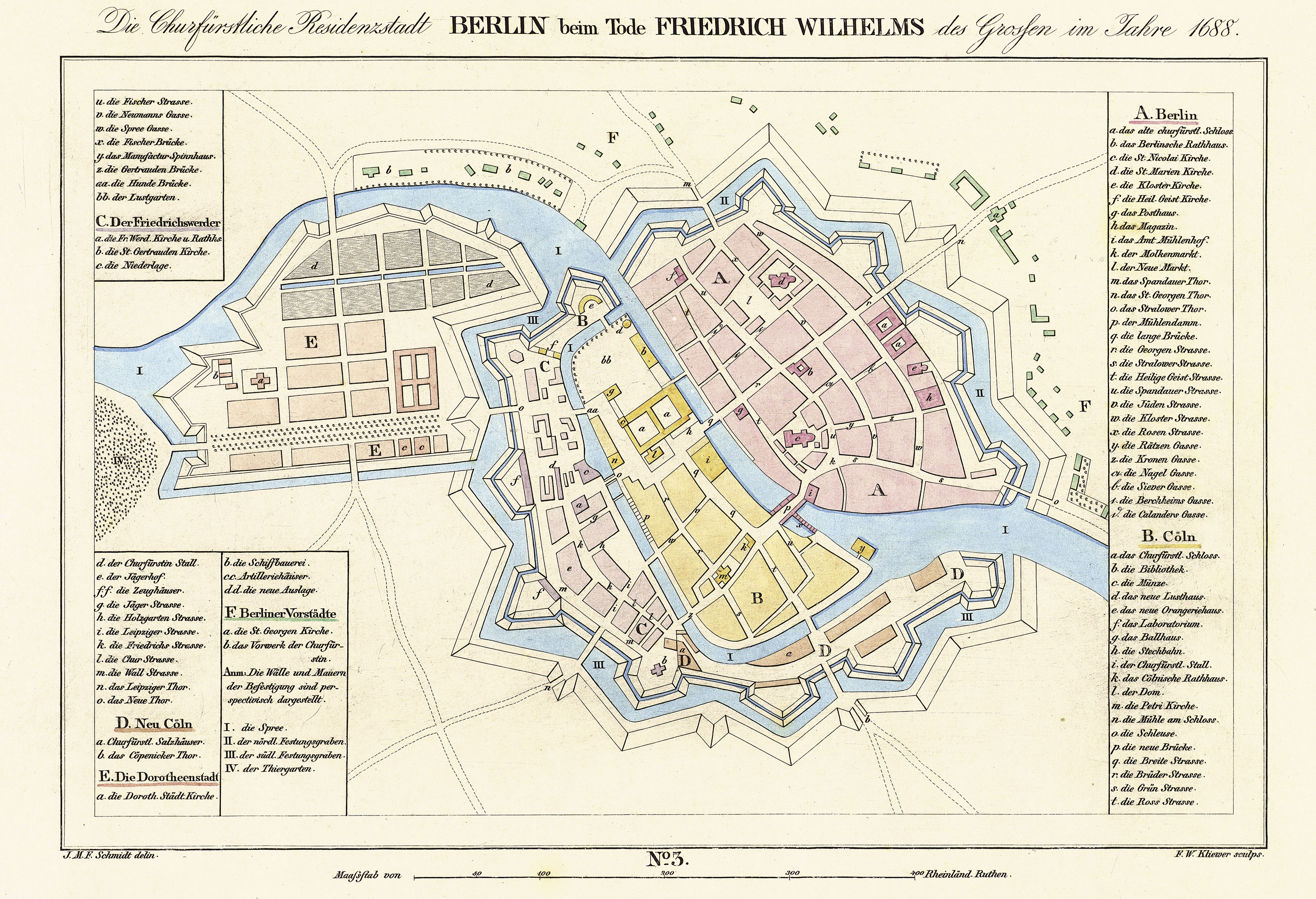
Regional map, circa 1688. Spandauer is in the north, marked F.

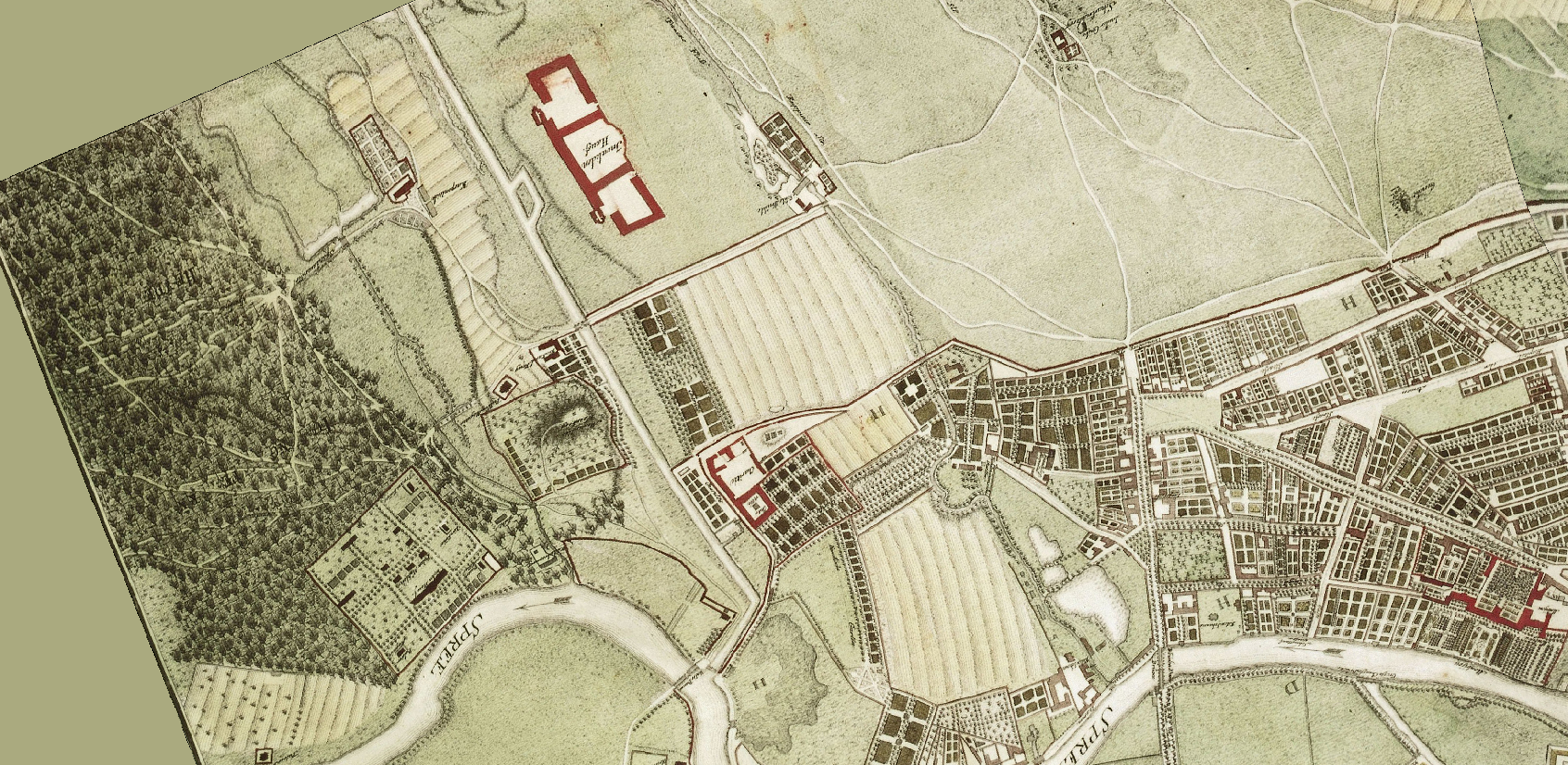
Image from 1748, surroundings of the Spandau Heerweg in Berlin ( from Monbijouplatz to Moabiter Weinberg, royal powder mills, Lehrte / Hauptbahnhof area)

The Spandauer neighborhood is bordered in the south by the Spree and the Stadtbahn viaduct, in the east by Karl Liebknecht St. and the adjacent neighborhoods of Königsstadt to the north, Torstrasse and Rosenthaler and Oranienburger to the east and Friedrichstrasse and Friedrich Wilhelm City to the south.

Spandauer is connected to Dorotheenstadt via the Weidendammer Bridge, the Ebert Bridge and the Monbijou Bridge.

== History ==
=== Namesake ===
The neighborhood takes its name from the adjacent Spandauer Gate (Spandauer Tor) a relic from Berlin's history as a historic walled city.

The eastern part of Spandauer along Rosenthaler St. is also known as the Scheunenviertel; a name that is often erroneously extended to streets to the west of it because of the shtetl located there around 1900, especially Oranienburger St where New Synagogue Berlin is located. The Nazis had applied the term Scheunenviertel to both of the neighborhoods in order to damage the Jewish neighborhood of Spandauer Vorstadt's reputation.

=== 17th century to 19th century ===
Spandauer developed north of the Spandauer Gate of the Berlin city wall. It has its origins in the Middle Ages and was initially a loose settlement in which Berliners operated gardening and agriculture for self-sufficiency. There was a similar use of land in front of all city gates. With the construction of the fortress in the middle of the 17th century, the Spandauer Gate was moved a little to the east in the area around today's Hackescher Market, but the name was retained.

On the occasion of her marriage in 1668, Dorothea of Schleswig-Holstein-Sonderburg-Glücksburg received property in the area of the Spandauer and the Tiergarten, which later became Dorotheenstadt, as a gift. She converted both sites into building land in order to obtain funds independently of the electoral court. In 1685, following the example of Dorotheenstadt, she had streets built here, parceled out land and sold these to Berlin citizens and - on the basis of the Edict of Potsdam issued in the same year to Huguenots.

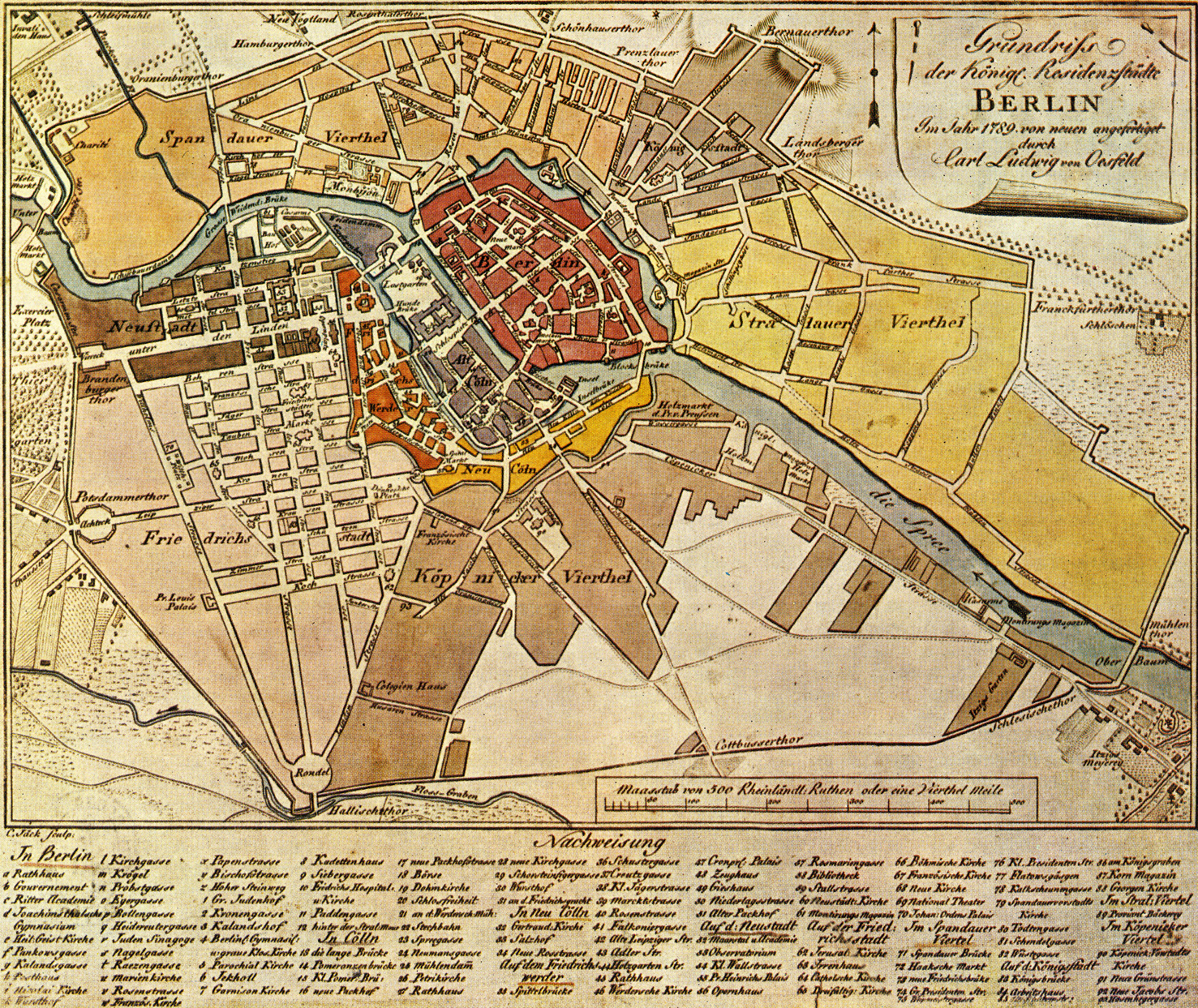
The Spandauer quarter, 1789

The Weidendammer Bridge was also built in 1685. It led the then cross street of Dorotheenstadt over the Spree and thus connected the two lands of Princess Dorothea. As a continuation of this street to the north, the Dammstraße was laid out as a connector to the country road to Oranienburg. The Dorotheenstadt was therefore much easier to reach from the north, just like the western Spandau suburb without a detour via the castle district. When the Friedrichstadt was laid out, the entire street was named Friedrichs St around 1705.

Around 1700, on the Spandauer Heerweg (Historic Roman road), in front of Monbijou Palace, was rebuilt as Oranienburger St main avenue through the neighborhood. A plague house was built in the extreme northwest corner of Spandau in 1710, from which the Charité (University Hospital) emerged. In 1710 there were already around 500 houses in Spandau. In 1712 it received its own parish church, Saint Sophia's Church in Great Hamburger St, which was donated by Queen Sophie Luise, Friedrich I's third wife.

=== Joining Berlin ===
In 1732, this area became part of Berlin. In 1750, on the instructions of King Friedrich II, the Berlin customs wall was extended in the north and south to the Spree. The facility was managed by the commander of Berlin, Hans Christoph v. Hacke (now known as Hackescher Market). The area between the Oranienburger Gate and Rosenthaler Gate was later named Oranienburger and Rosenthaler. In 1751 the fortress was leveled in this area except for a sewer ditch; the street name Am Zwirngraben still reminds of it today. A new Jewish quarter was also laid out in the eastern Spandau suburb (known today as the 'Scheunenviertel').

== Since the 20th century ==
When Greater Berlin was formed in 1920, Spandau became part of the newly formed Mitte district. The Second World War caused comparatively little damage in the Spandau neighborhood. Some important historical buildings such as Monbijou Castle were destroyed and later demolished. The maintenance of historical building was neglected for decades, which led to vacancy and decay. Saint Sophia's Church was not reconstructed until the 1980s; At the same time, renovation began in places through demolition and new construction.

The neighborhood of Spandauer is now recognized historic district and is considered the largest and best preserved historical district of Berlin. Since the German reunification in 1990, a large part of the development has been renovated and Spandau has developed into a residential, business and trendy district that is attractive for tourists and with a tendency towards gentrification.

== Cultural and notable places ==
=== Museums and galleries ===
There are a number of museums that focus on the Jewish history of the neighborhood. The New Synagogue - Centrum Judaicum, was restored and opened in 1995, is located at Oranienburger Strasse 28–30, a center dedicated to the care and preservation of Jewish culture. The Anne Frank Center and the Museum of Otto Weidt's Workshop for the Blind are located near Hackescher Market at Rosenthaler Straße 39.

Auguststraße a street that is known beyond the borders of Berlin, for its gallery scene. The best-known gallery is KW Institute for Contemporary Art (also known as Kunst-Werke), located at Auguststrasse 64. From 2006 until 2012, the C/O Berlin gallery occupied the historic Postfuhramt building, and hosting public art.

The ruins of the former Passage Department Store on Oranienburger St were occupied by artists in 1992 and made a name for themselves as the Kunsthaus Tacheles. In 2012 the artists were forced to leave in spite of numerous protests. After the renovation and inclusion in the urban development project between Friedrichstrasse, Johannisstrasse and Oranienburgerstrasse, the Tacheles is to be used again for cultural purposes. In 2023, Fotografiska Berlin opened a permanent photography museum in the restored Kunsthaus Tacheles complex.

=== Theater, vaudeville and dance ===
The Volksbühne or "People's Theater," built between 1913 and 1914 according to plans by Oskar Kaufmann, is located on Rosa-Luxemburg-Platz, the former Bülowplatz. The Friedrichstadt-Palast often shortened to Palast Berlin, has the largest theater stage in the world and a long tradition. In 1984, the Friedrichstadtpalast moved to the newly built revue theater at Friedrichstrasse 107. In the Hackesche Höfe complex, at Rosenthaler Straße 40/41, there is the Theater Chamäleon which was founded in 1991 and shows changing programs.

The Sophiensæle is another location for theater and dance in the Handwerkervereinshaus (Craftsman's Association) building, built in 1904–1905 by the architects Joseph Fraenkel and Theodor Kampfmeyer.

The Clärchens Ballhaus, is a historic ballroom, dancehall, and restaurant which has been operating continuously for over 100 years, located on Auguststrasse. In 2020, the Clärchens Ballhaus closed during COVID-19 and uncertain times.

=== Notable buildings ===
==== Historic buildings that no longer exist ====
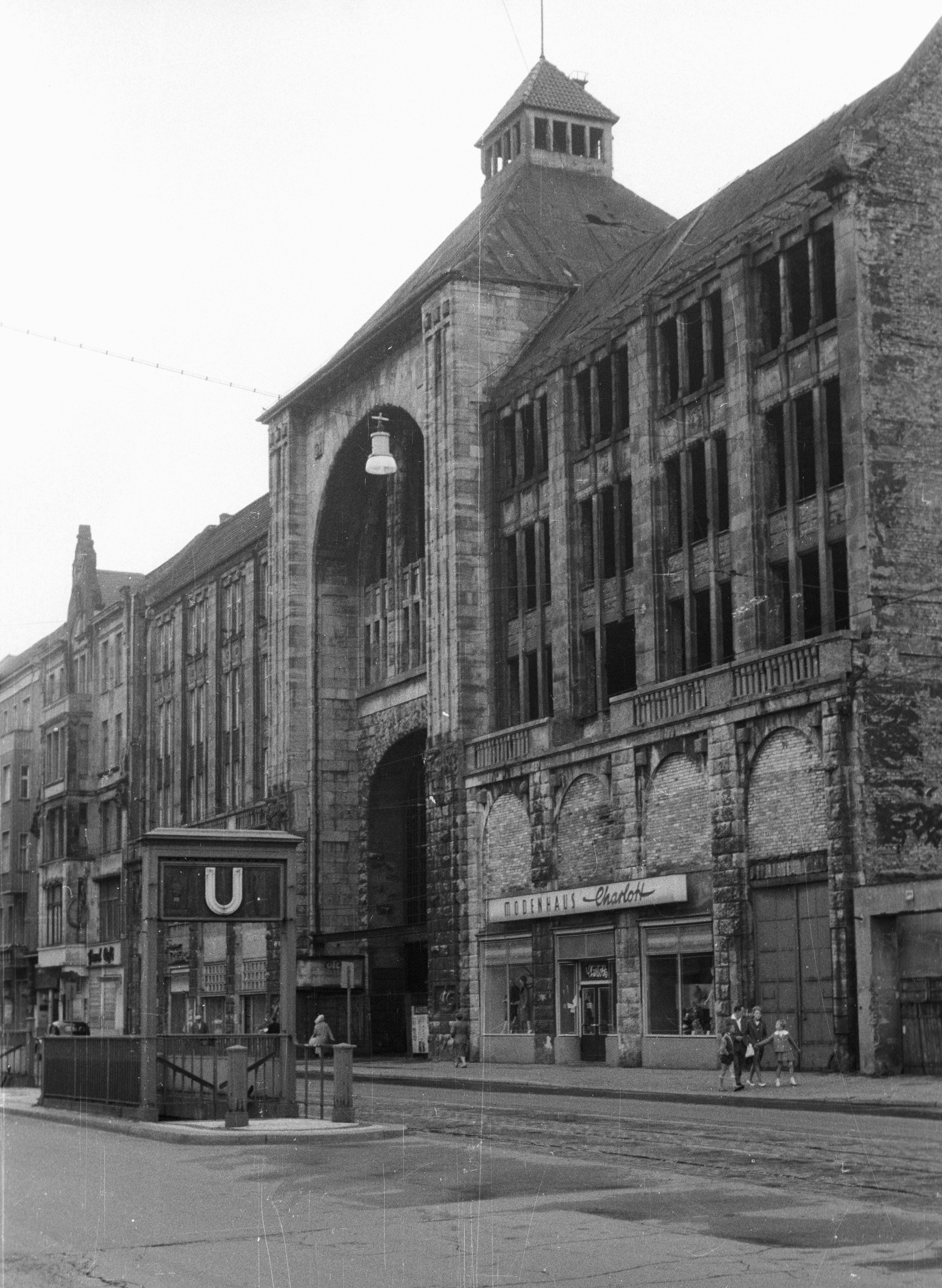
Friedrichstrasse Passage (Friedrichstraßenpassage)]

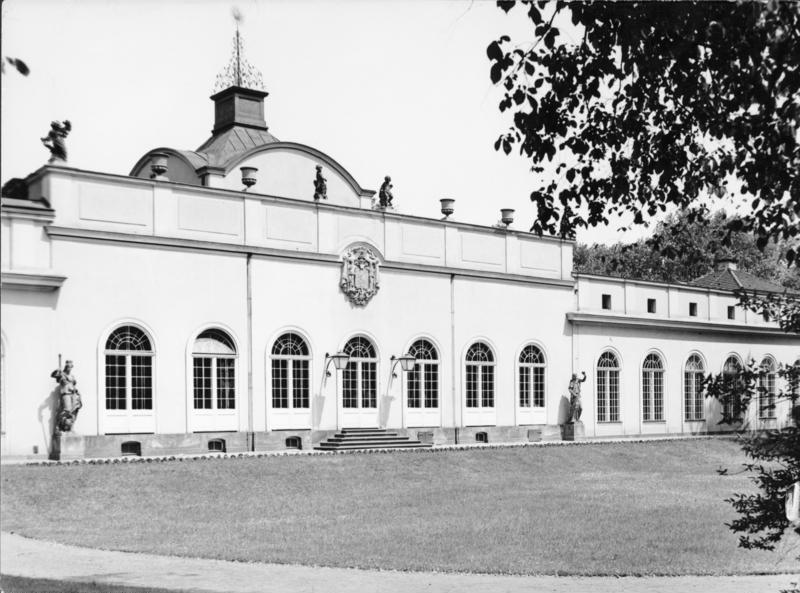
Monbijou Palace (Schloss Monbijou), Spreefront

Between 1703 and 1706 King Friedrich I had the court architect Eosander von Göthe built a small pleasure palace in the late Baroque style on the north bank of the Spree beyond the Spandauer Gate. The Monbijou Palace last housed the Hohenzollern Museum. The two-story gatehouses on Monbijouplatz shaped the cityscape. The building and gatehouses were badly damaged in World War II and the ruins were torn down in 1959.

In 1859, the building of the Cathedral Candidate Foundation (in German, Domkandidatenstift), built according to plans by Stüler, was inaugurated at Oranienburger Strasse 76a. Various parts of the building were grouped around an inner courtyard and a tower in the street front formed the distinctive highlight. The building complex, which had burned out during the Second World War, was demolished in 1972.

The St. George's Church, built according to plans by architect Julius Raschdorff in 1885, was inaugurated on the grounds of Monbijou Castle. The original church building, in the style of 19th century English churches, was destroyed during World War II.

In 1909, the Friedrichstrasse Passage was opened at Friedrichstrasse 110–112, which connected Friedrichstrasse with Oranienburger Strasse. The portal buildings on both street fronts and the mighty domed hall inside the block were striking. In 1983 the building, which was last called “House of Technology” and was badly damaged in World War II, was demolished. Only the front building on Oranienburger Strasse remained standing and became known as the Kunsthaus Tacheles.

==== Registered historic buildings ====
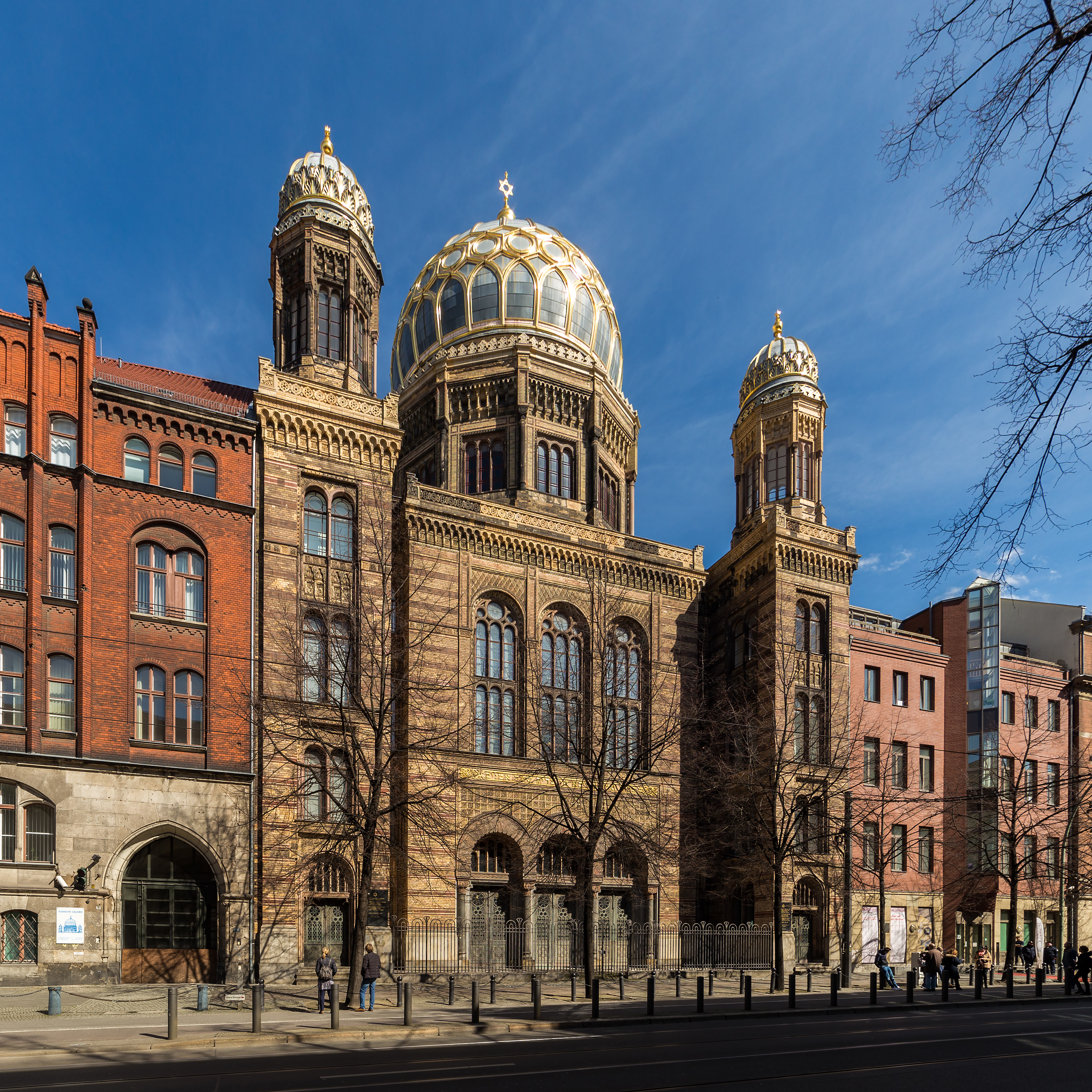
New Synagogue on Oranienburger Straße

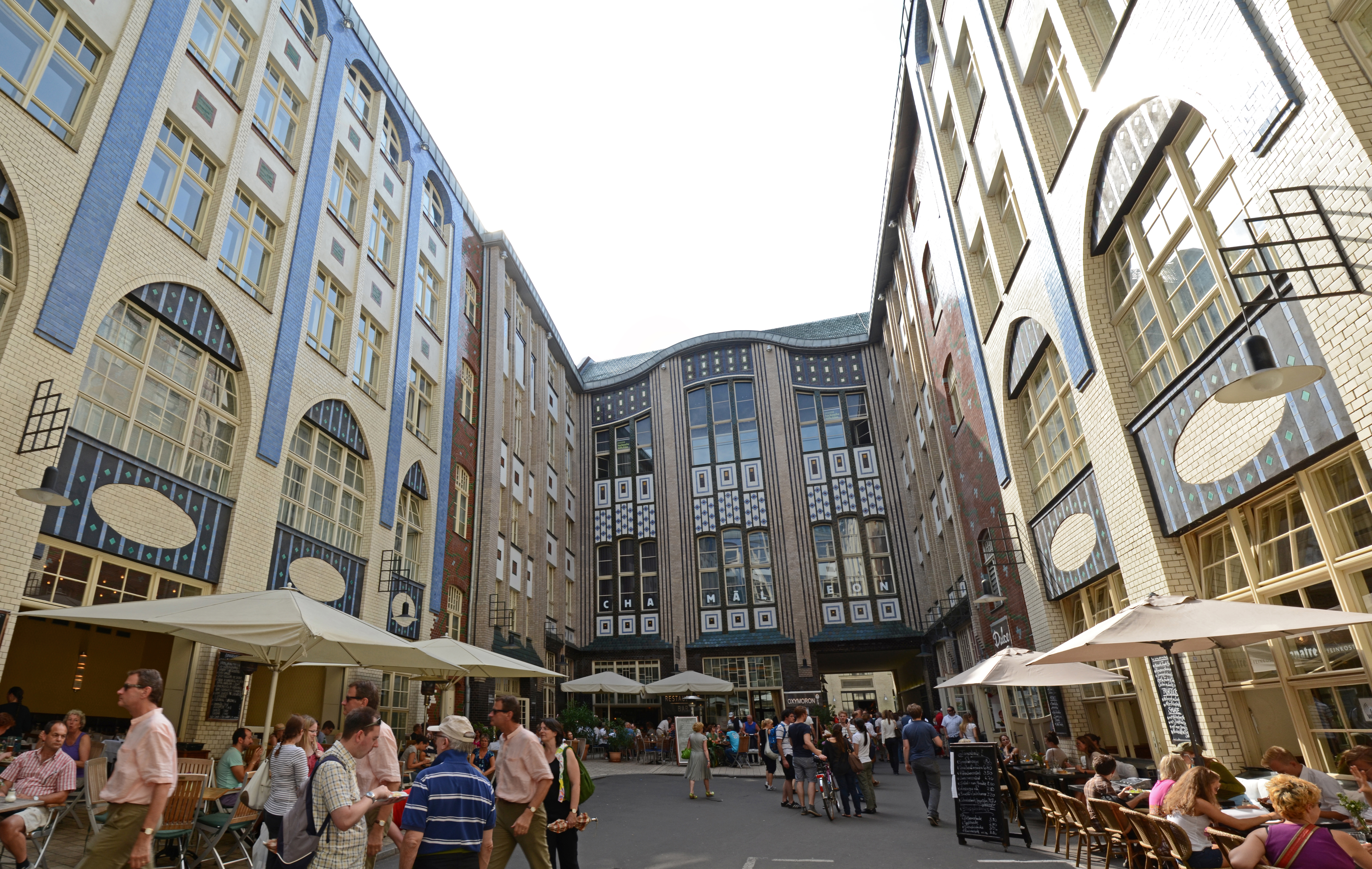
Court of Hackeschen Höfe

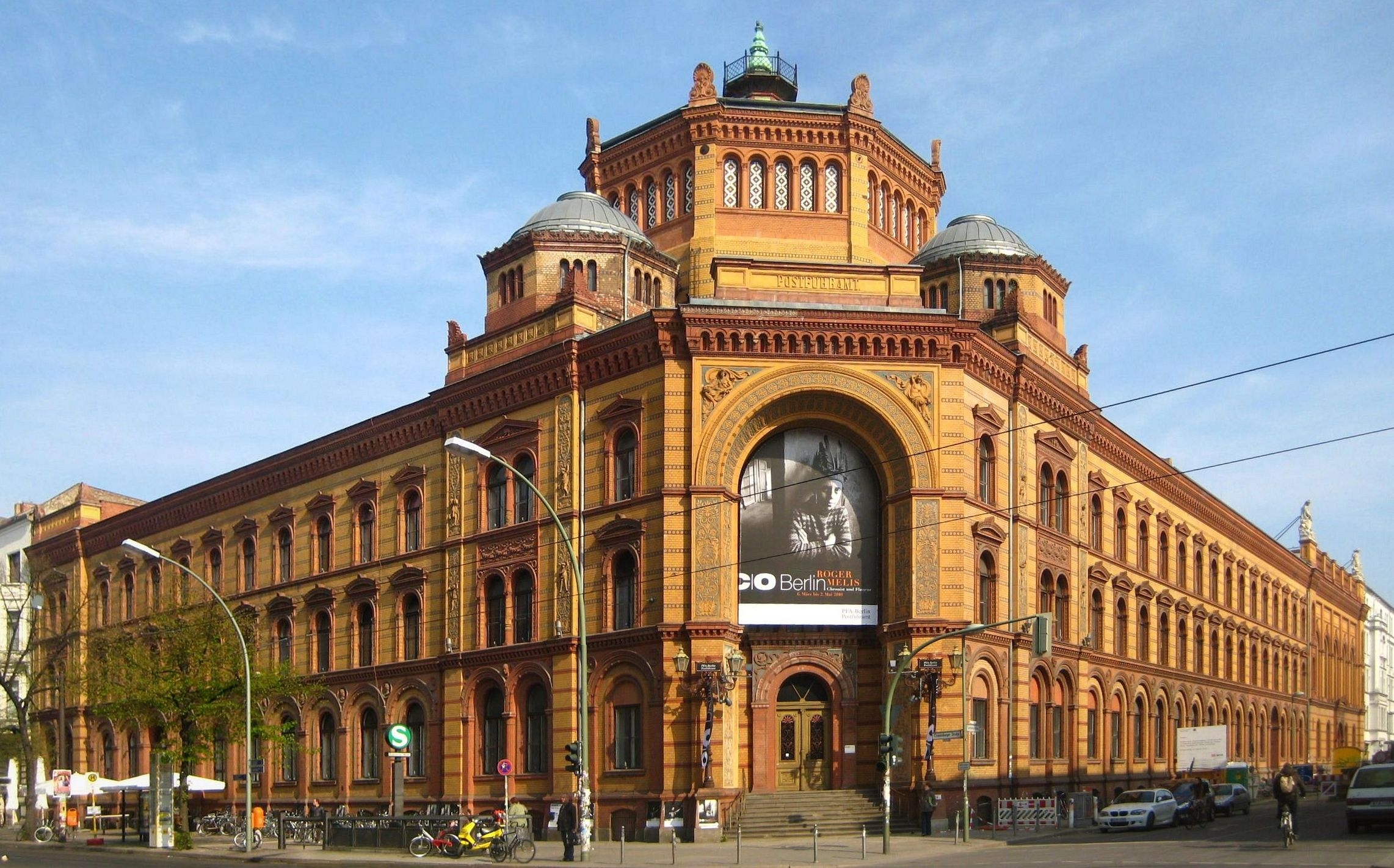
Postfuhramt, a former government post office building

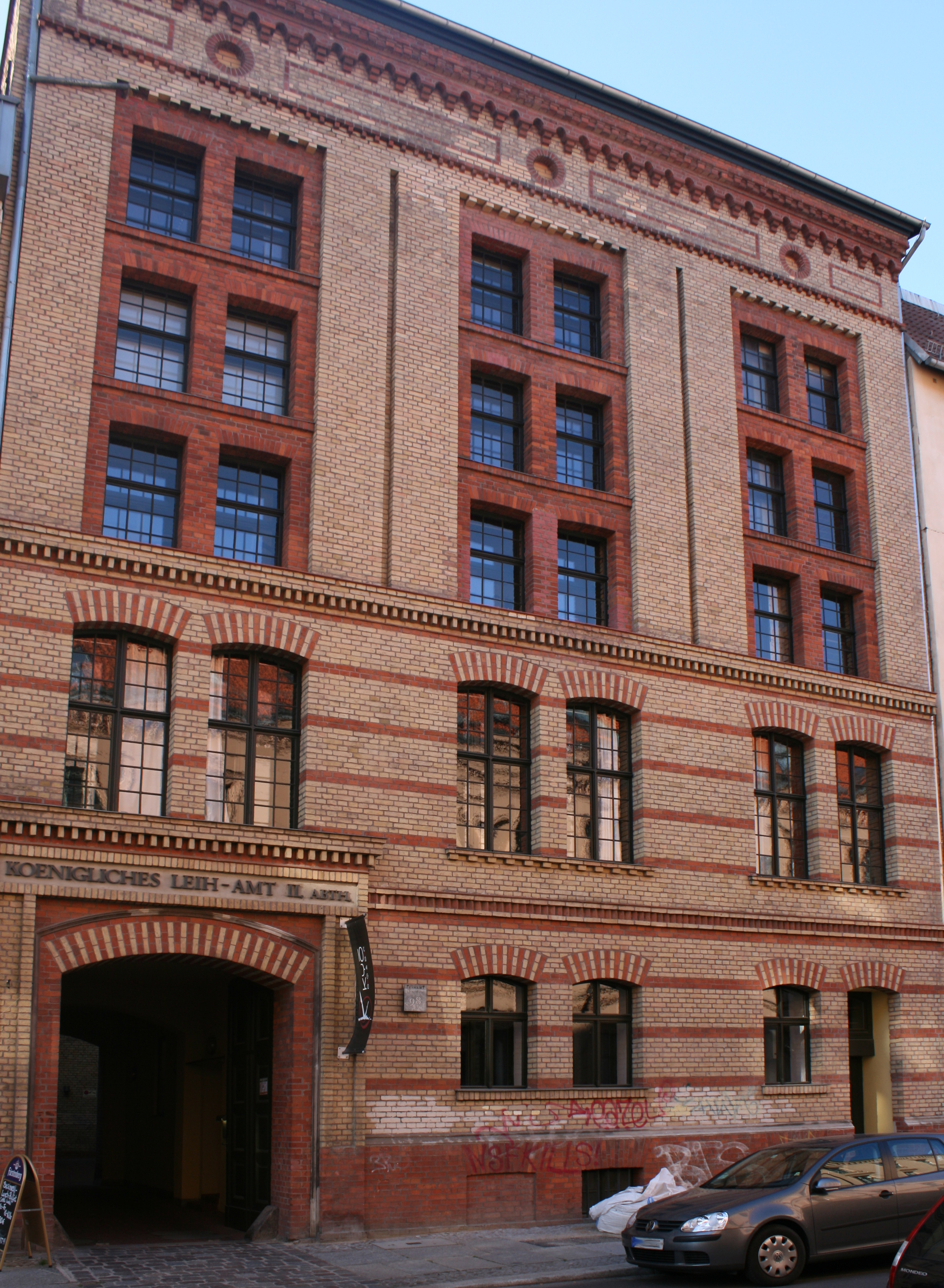
Royal Loan Office (Königliches Leihamt)

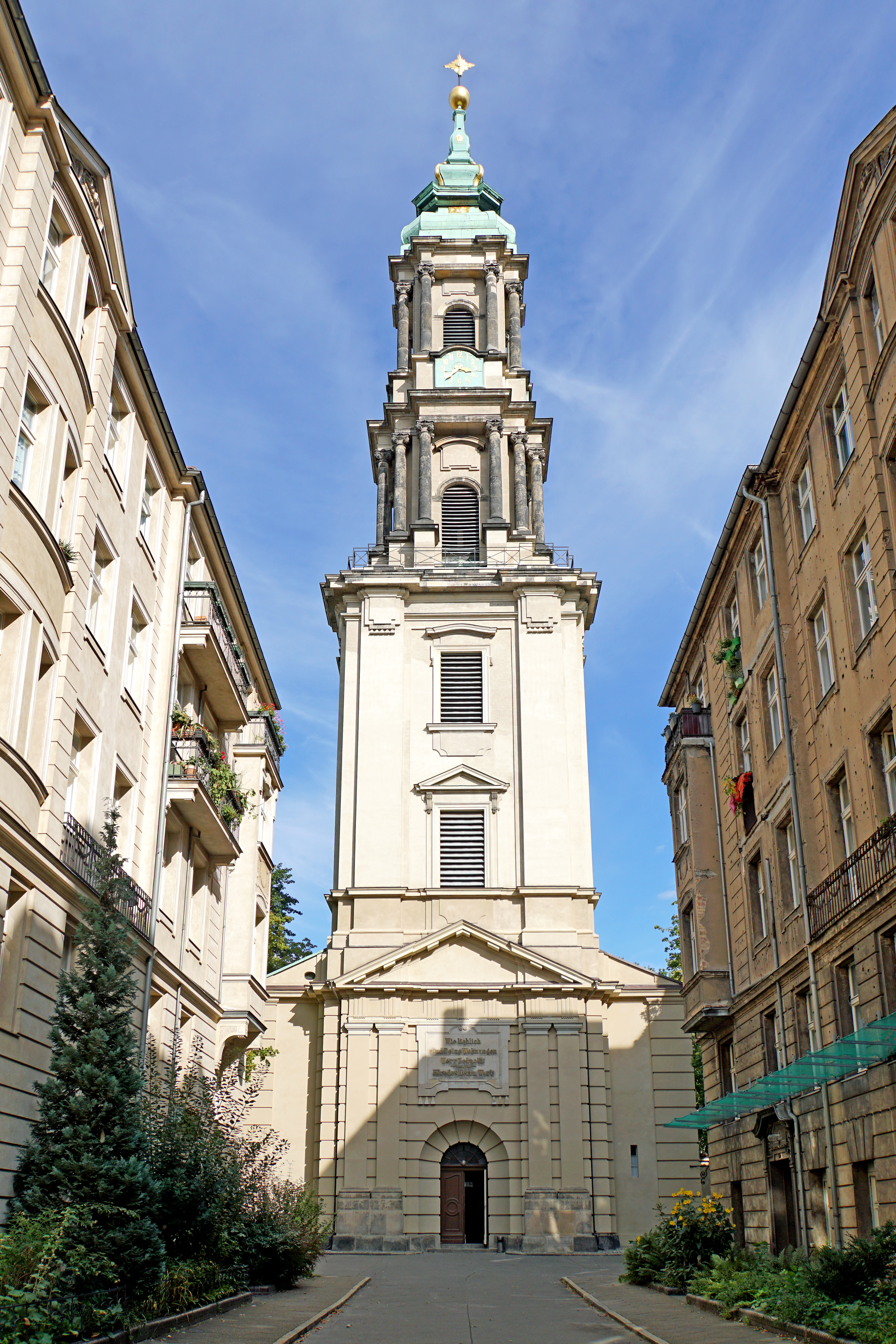
Sophienkirche, a Protestant church

==== Modern buildings ====
Between 1999 and 2000, twelve individual houses were built on the east side of Hackescher Markt on the corner of Dircksenstrasse. Shops are located on the ground floors and the upper floors are residential. The architecture firm Bellmann & Böhm developed the master in 1996–1998.

After World War II, there were certain areas that needed housing because of the damage of bombs, and as a result many prefabricated buildings were used in the 1960s to fill in these areas. Between 2013 until 2015, some 319 apartments in six prefabricated complexes in the Spandauer Vorstadt district that have been renovated by local housing association, WBM Wohnungsbaugesellschaft Berlin-Mitte.

Around the neighborhood are Stolpersteine (stumbling stones) in front of many buildings and memorial sights, this was from a project from the 1990s where a brass plate inscribed with the name and life dates of victims of Nazi murder or persecution, most of which were Jewish people. There are 1,400 Stolpersteine in the city of Berlin, primarily located in Spandauer Vorstadt and Scheunenviertel.
