= Postfuhramt =

Former Berlin central postal hub built in Italian Renaissance Revival style

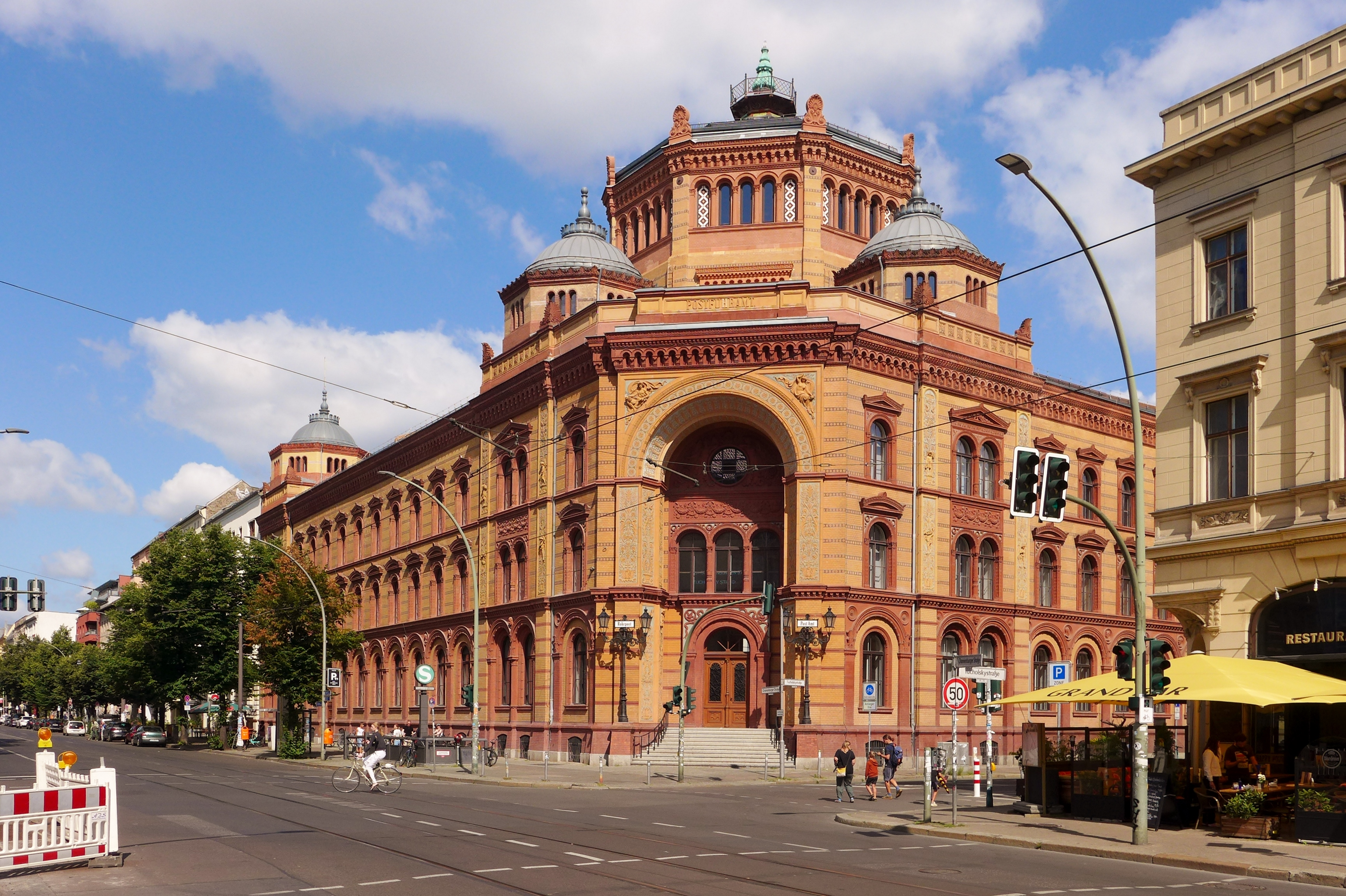
- Postfuhramt (2024)
- Interactive map of the Postfuhramt area
- Former names: Kaiserliche Postfuhramt
- Alternative names: Rohrpost Berlin, Postamt Rohrpost

General information
- Coordinates: 52°31′31″N 13°23′34″E
- Construction started: 1875
- Construction stopped: 1881
- Opened: 1881; 145 years ago

Postfuhramt (English: Mail Delivery Office), formally known as Kaiserliche Postfuhramt (English: Imperial Mail Delivery Office) is a historic building built in 1881 and located on Oranienburger Straße (English: Oranienburger Street) at the corner of Tucholskystraße (English: Tucholsky Street), in the Spandauer Vorstadt area of Mitte, Berlin. Since 1975, it has been a listed as a protected building (via Denkmalschutz).

At the Postfuhramt Ottomar Anschütz held the first showing of life sized pictures in motion on 25 November 1894. From 2006 until 2012, the space hosted an art gallery and exhibitions. In 2012, the building was sold to Biotronik, a medical manufacturing company specializing in medical technology.

== Pre-history ==
Starting in 1713, the property had historically been used by the Postilion, a long haul mail service and a forerunner to postal mail. After 1766, a post office was located on the property with living quarters for the German royal postman and two multi-story horse stable wings.

In March 1874, many horses died due to hygiene issue with old stables. Additionally around this same time there was an increased demand for postal service as population and traffic grew in the area and as a result it was incorporated into the Reichspost and became part of the newly established Postfuhramt, under state management.

== Postfuhramt early history ==
=== Architecture ===
Postfuhramt was built between 1875 and 1881. The architect of the building was Carl Schwatlo, with assistance of Wilhelm Tuckermann, and the iron dome was designed by Johann Wilhelm Schwedler. It was created under the leadership of the postmaster general Heinrich Stephan. The building was designed in an Italian Renaissance Revival style (specifically Northern Italian-Lombard early Renaissance) with yellow clinker brick and highlighting tile in turquoise blue and terracotta red, and its dome was designed with a Byzantine influence. The three domes on the Postfuhramt building were created to reflect on the architecture one block away, at the New Synagogue.

The exterior of the building is decorated with 26 terracotta bust of people associated with the postal service and communications sector and they are presented in chronological order.

=== Modernization and World War II ===
In 1925, all of the horse stables were removed in the process of modernization. The Postfuhramt housed a pneumatic tube mail system (German: Rohrpost), which was active in the ca. 1940s until 1976.

During World War II, the Postfuhramt suffered considerable damages. Air strikes hit the building and the side of the building facing Oranienburger Straße was burned down to the first floor. The building was threatened for demolition in the 1960s and 1970s. In 1973, a major renovation and restoration started on the structure. The building was used for postal service purposes until 1995.

Postfuhramt history

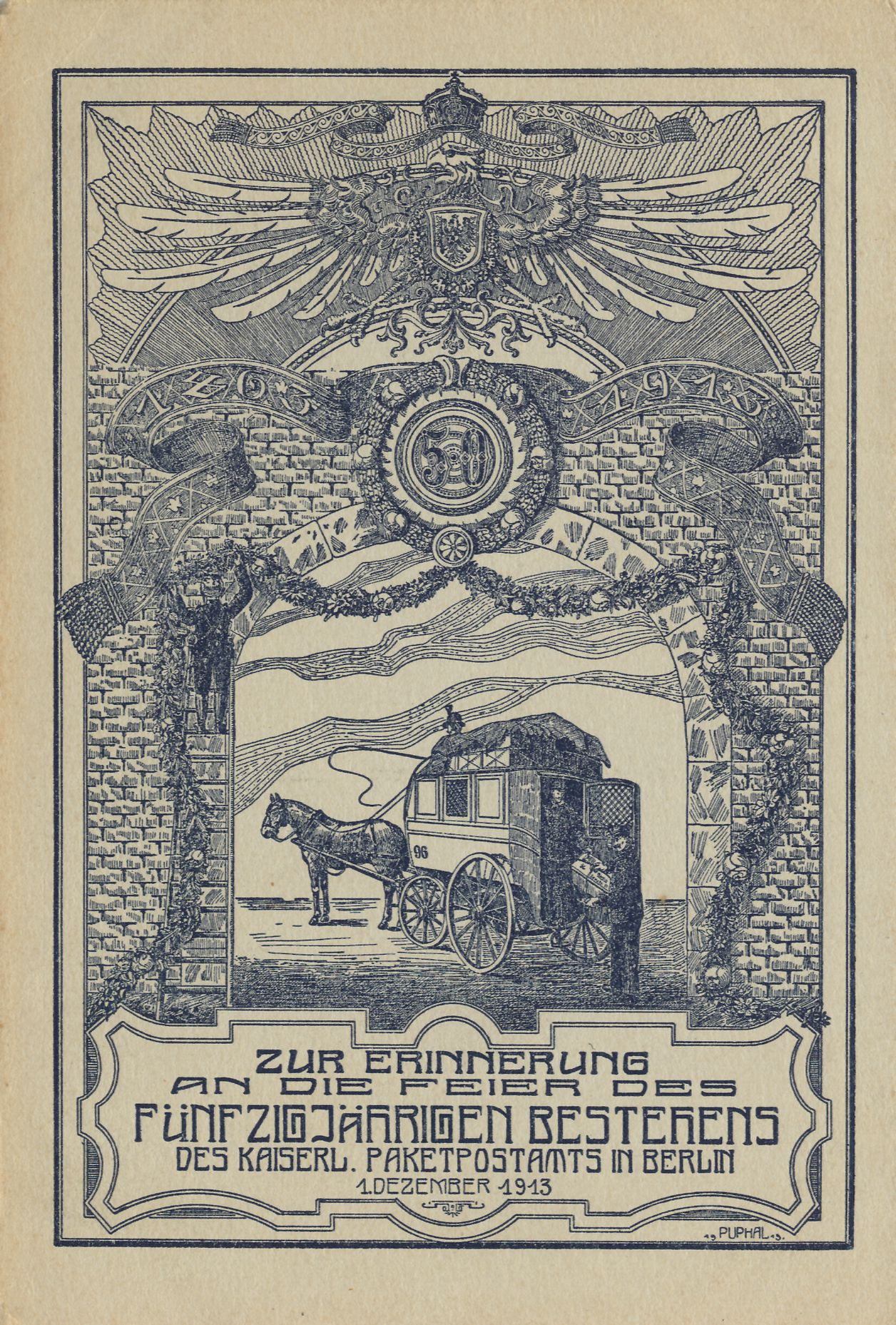

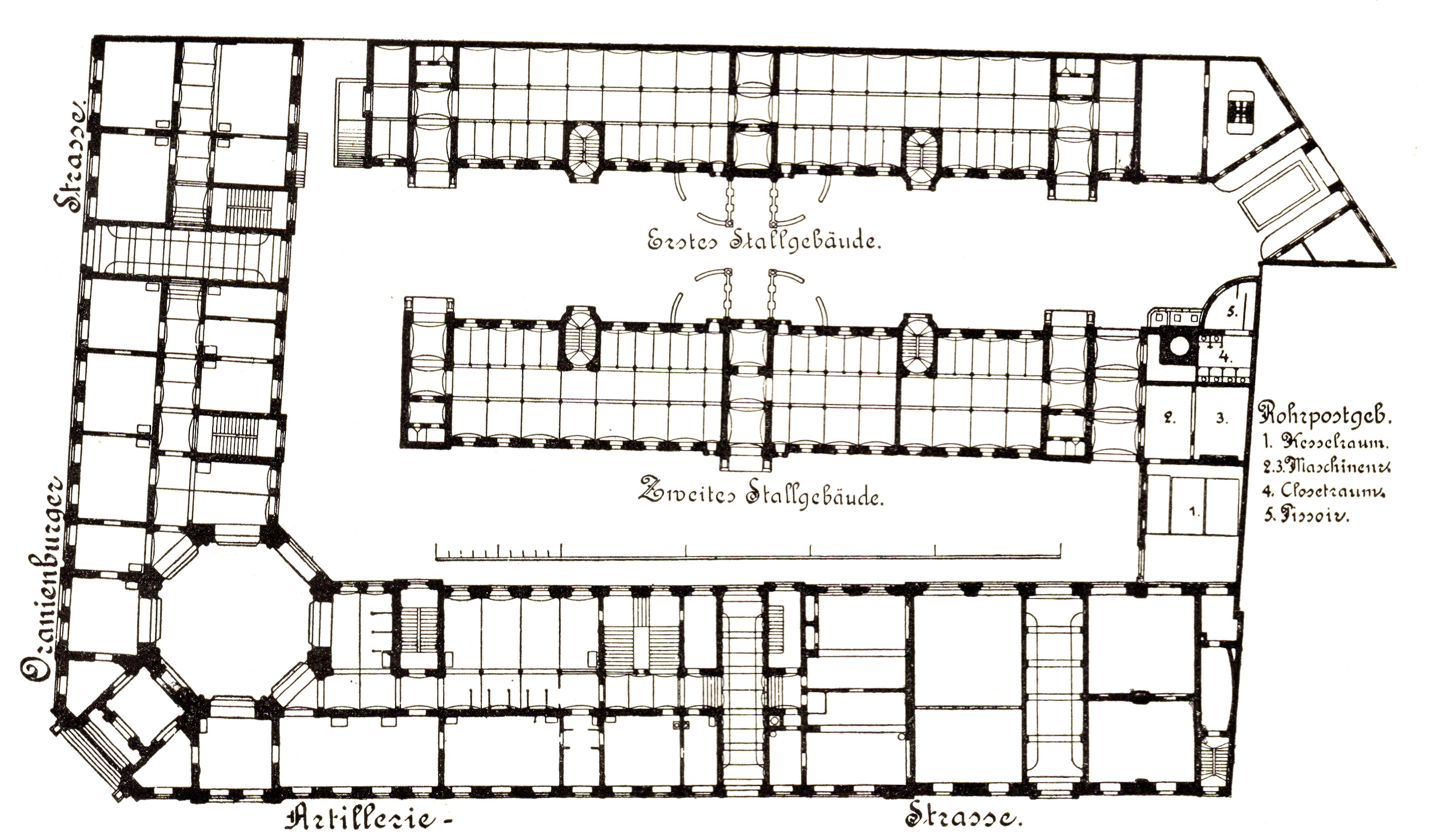

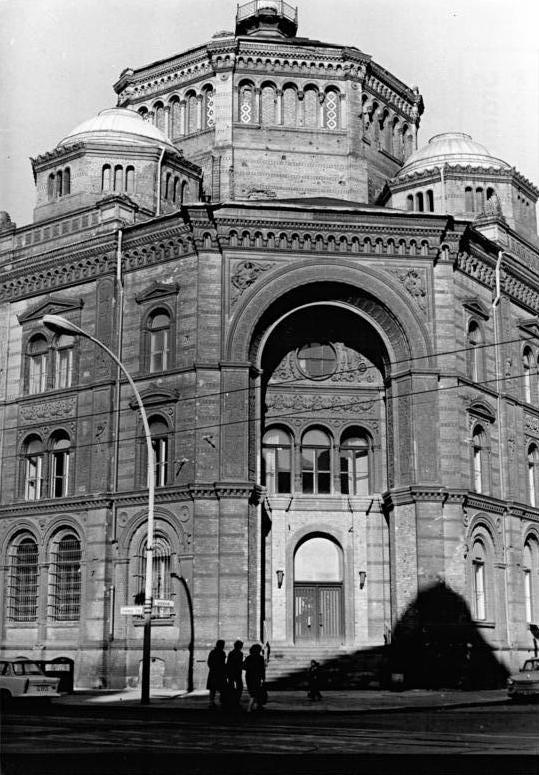

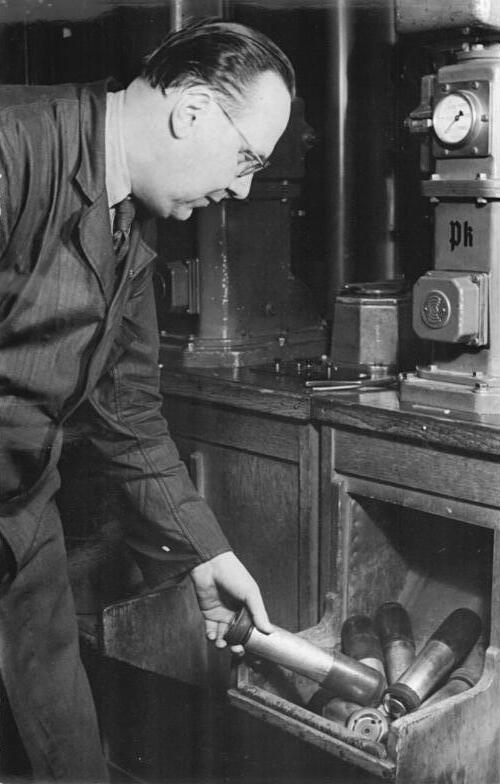

== Postfuhramt present–day ==
Between 1997 and 2001 changing public art exhibitions took place in the property of the Postfuhramt. In 1998–1999, the 1st Berlin Biennale was hosted at the Postfuhramt, as well as other locations in Berlin. In 2001, artist HA Schult created his work, Love Letters Building by covering the front of the Postfuhramt with hundreds of thousands of love letters. The Berlinische Galerie was intended to occupy the building but they could not find financing for the building restoration needed.

In 2005, Israeli investor Adi Keizman, the husband of Ofra Strauss, bought the building from Deutsche Post for 13.5 million euros in hopes of converting the Postfuramt into an internationally known art space and partner with local galleries. After a period of vacancy, the first exhibition was held in summer 2006 with a partnership with C/O Berlin gallery. The gallery was given 26,910 square feet (2500 square meters) of exhibition space and was required to pay a "culture rent" and have a minimum number of paying customers to stay active in the space. However by 2012, the partnership with C/O Berlin officially ended, after a few deadline extensions.

By August 2012, the European manufacturer of medical technology Biotronik purchased the building, without owing an explanation about the building's future use. After extensive renovation, the company is now using the space as a conference and education center for pacemakers.

Postfuhramt present–day

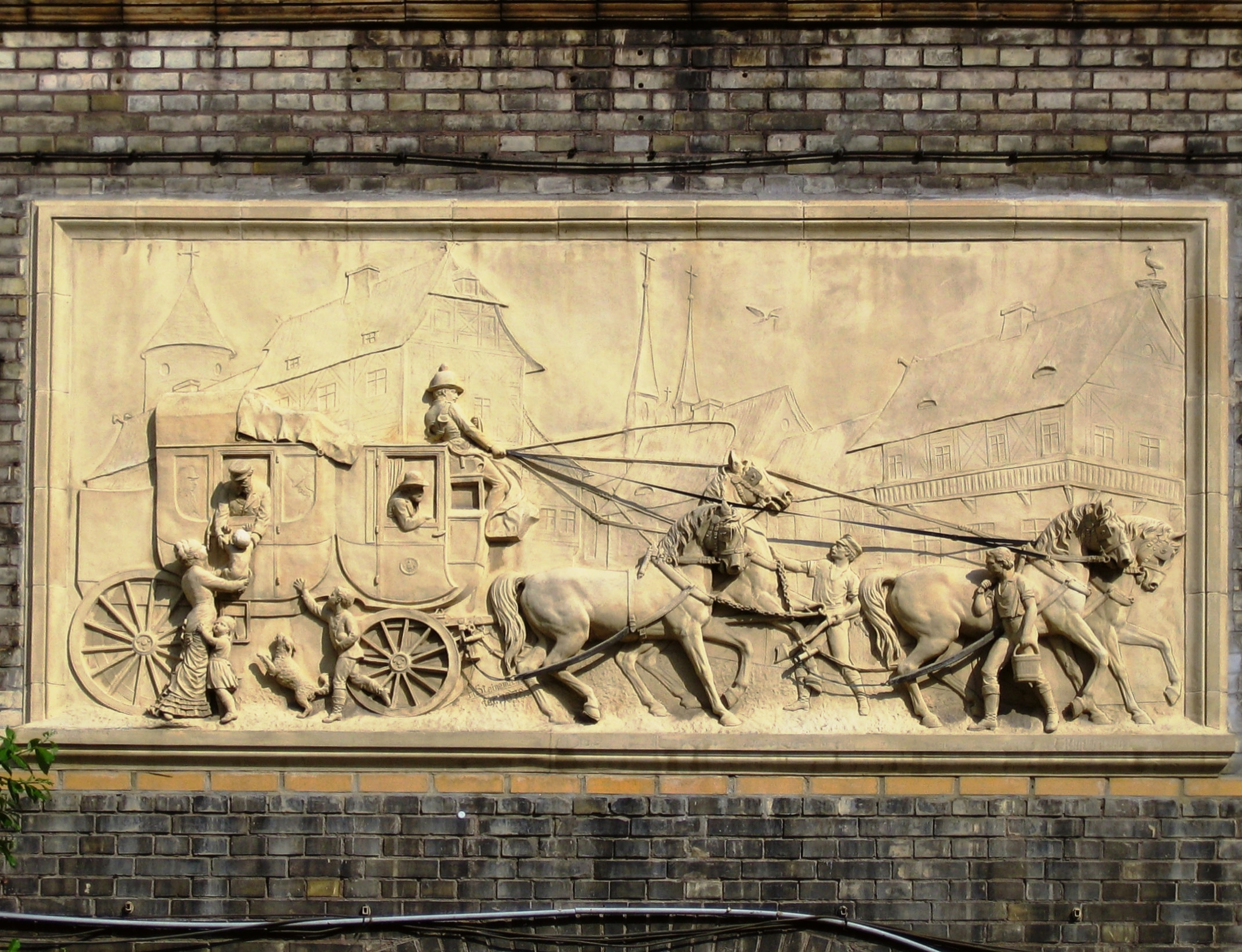

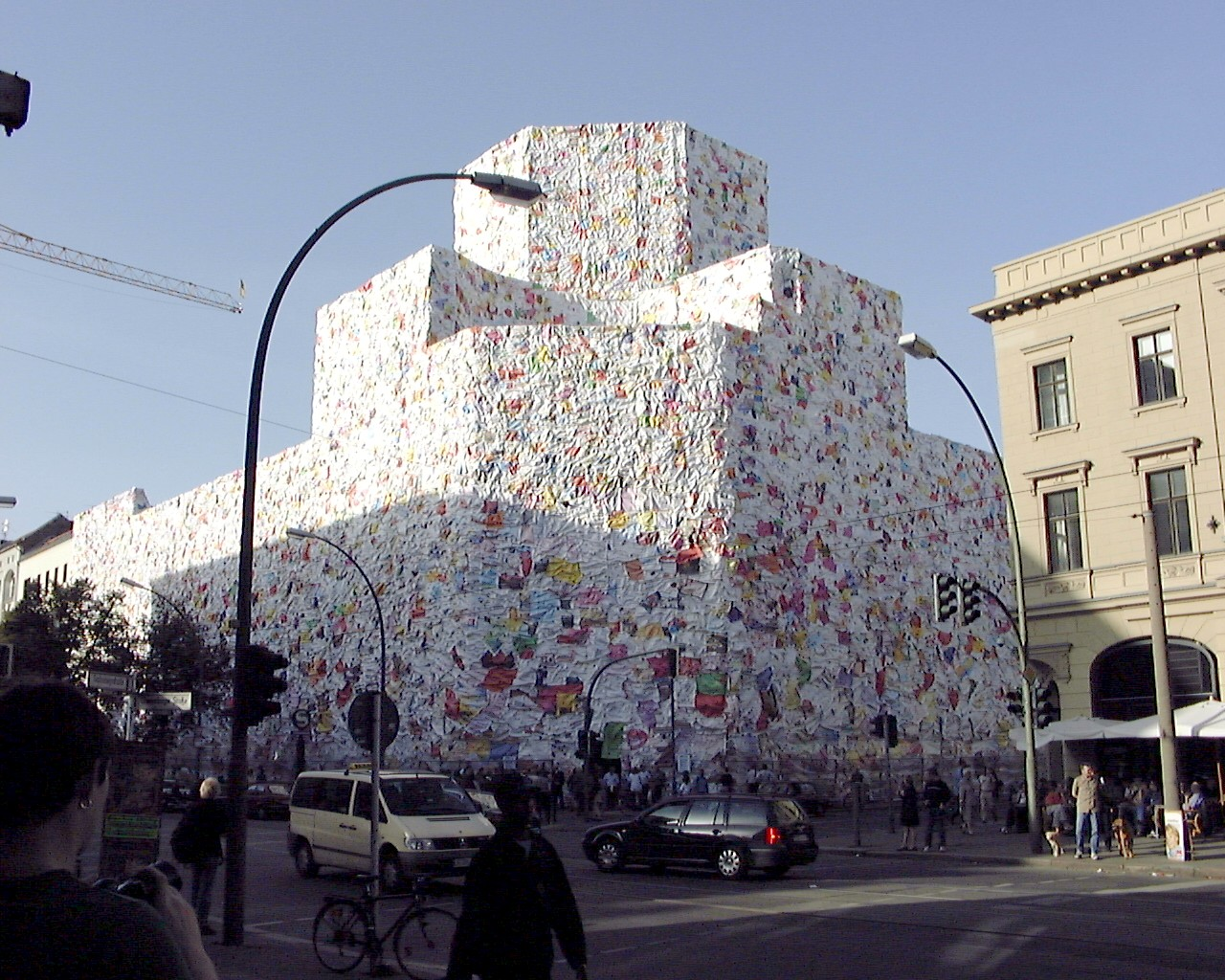

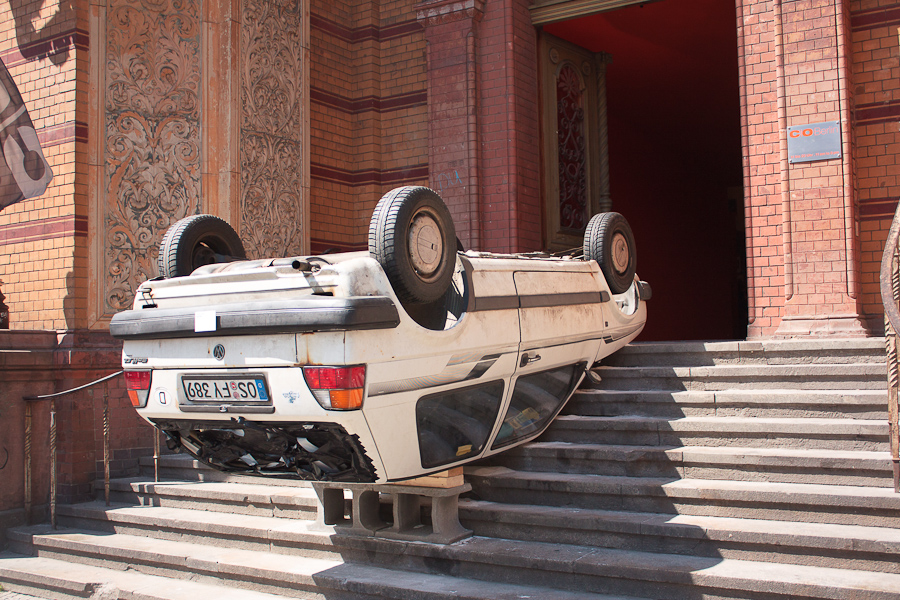

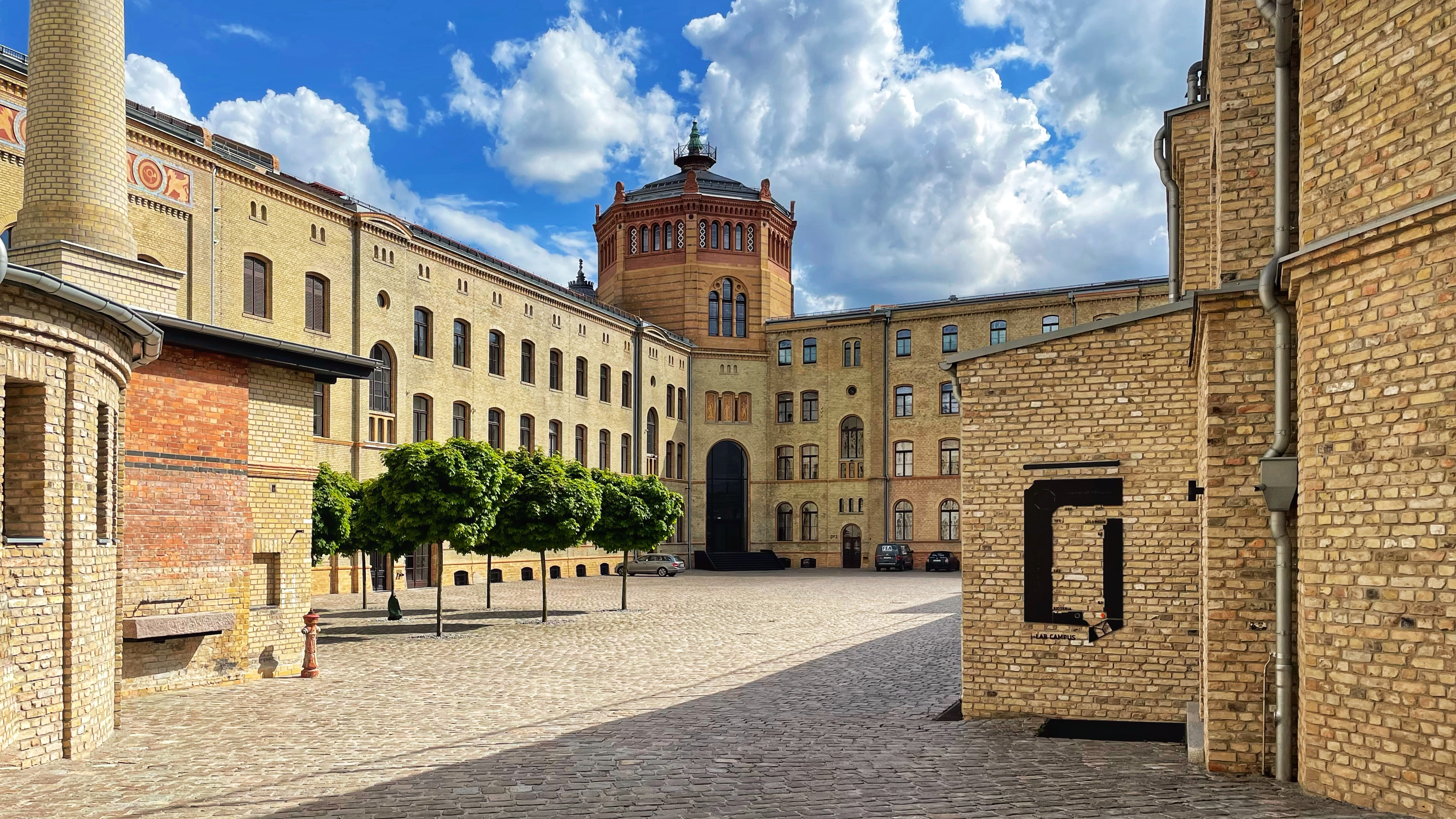

== List of portraits ==
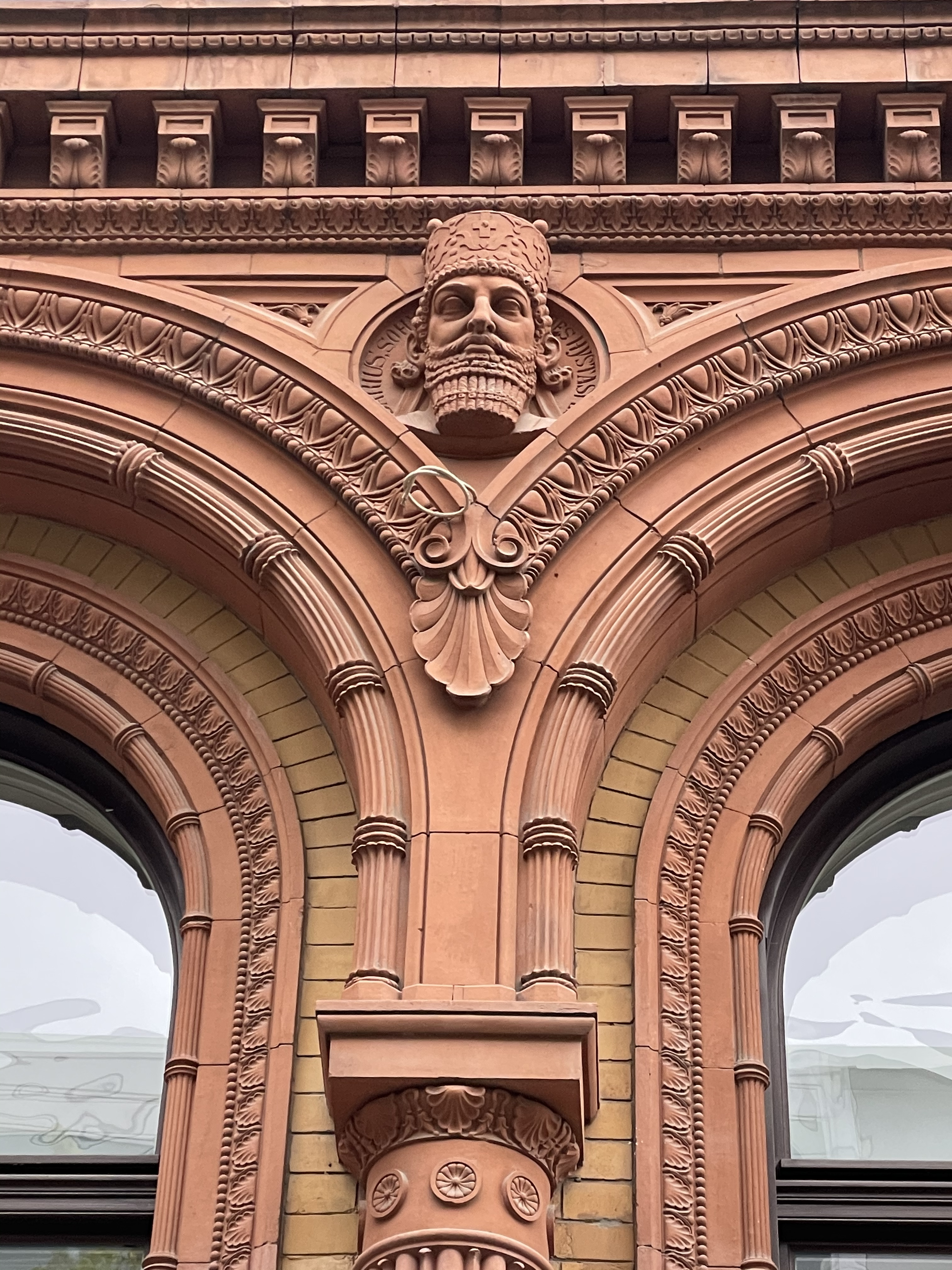
Darius I bust on the Postfuramt building

The following portraits are placed on the exterior of the building, between the arches of the windows on the ground floor of the building:

- (No. 1) – Darius I, son of Hystaspes (549–485 BC)
- (No. 2) – Herodotus (484–425 BC)
- (No. 3) – Marcus Vipsanius Agrippa (ca. 63–12 BC)
- (No. 4) – Marco Polo (ca. 1254–1324)
- (No. 5) – Johannes Gutenberg (around 1400–1468)
- (No. 6) – Christopher Columbus (1451–1506)
- (No. 7) – Franz von Taxis (around 1459–1517)
- (No. 8) – Nikolaus Copernikus (1473–1543)
- (No. 9) – Luigi Galvani (1737–1798)
- (No. 10) – James Watt (1736–1819)
- (No. 11) – Alessandro Volta (1745–1827)
- (No. 12) – Johann Friedrich von Seegebarth (1747–1823)
- (No. 13) – Karl August von Hardenberg (1750–1822)
- (No. 14) – Alexander von Humboldt (1769–1859)
- (No. 15) – Karl Ferdinand Friedrich von Nagler (1770–1846)
- (No. 16) – Carl Friedrich Gauss (1777–1855)
- (No. 17) – Gottlob Heinrich Schmückert (1790–1862)
- (No. 18) – Benjamin Franklin (1706–1790)
- (No. 19) – George Stephenson (1781–1848)
- (No. 20) – Hans Christian Ørsted (1777–1851)
- (No. 21) – Samuel F. B. Morse (1791–1872)
- (No. 22) – August von der Heydt (1801–1874)
- (No. 23) – Werner von Siemens (1816–1892)
- (No. 24) – Carl August von Steinheil (1801–1870)
- (No. 25) – unknown, destroyed in the war
- (No. 26) – Gustav Robert Kirchhoff (1824–1887)
