= C/O Berlin =

Exhibition space in Berlin

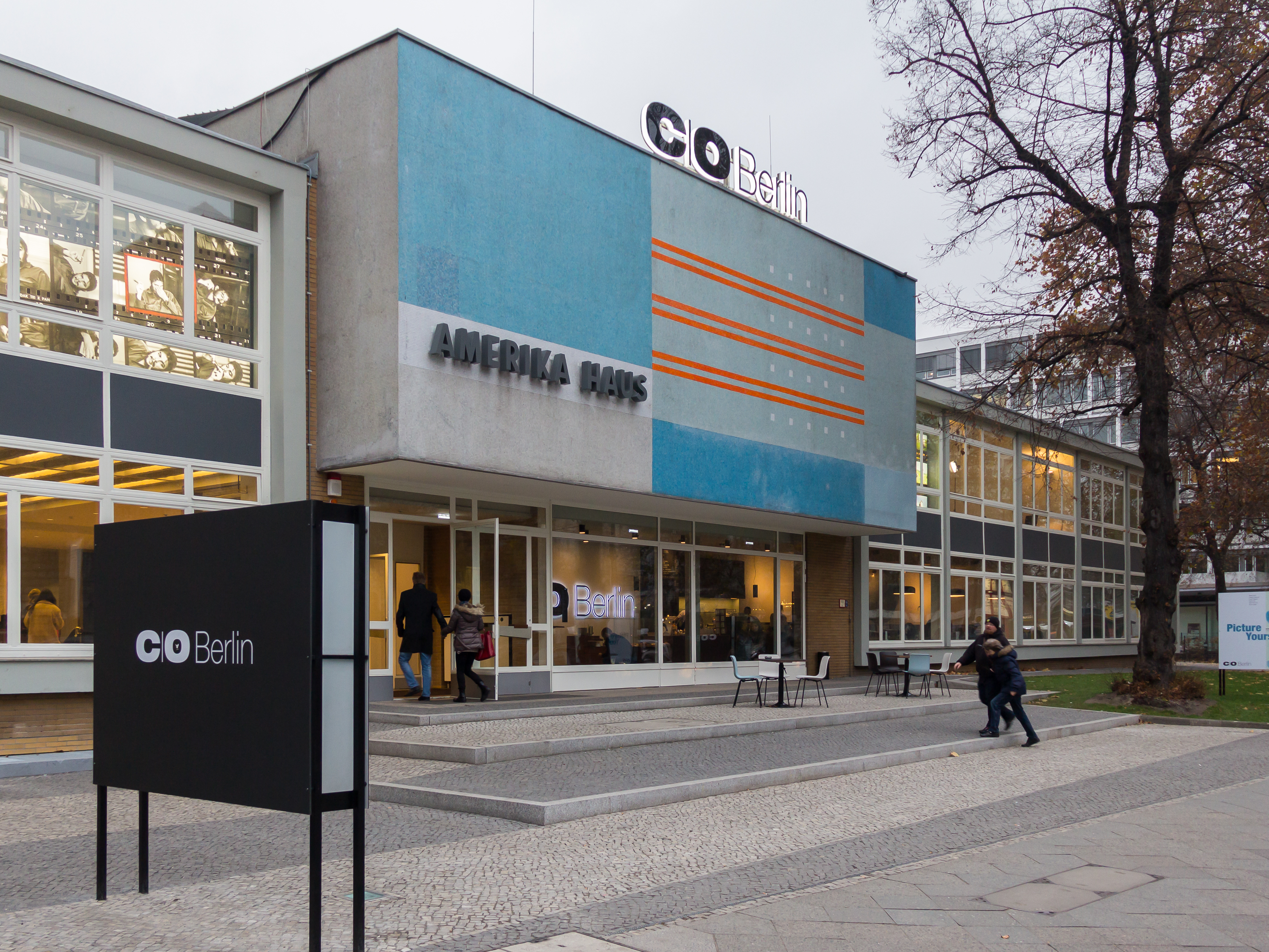
- Established: 2000
- Location: Amerika Haus, Hardenbergstraße 22–24, 10623 Berlin
- Coordinates: 52°30′24″N 13°19′50″E
- Type: Charitable foundation
- Founders: Stephan Erfurt, Marc Naroska, Ingo Pott
- Curators: Co-heads of program Boaz Levin and Sophia Greiff
- Website: www.co-berlin.org/en/

C/O Berlin is a private exhibition space for photography and visual media in Berlin. It is located in Amerika Haus Berlin by Zoologischer Garten station, Charlottenburg, where it has more than 2,500 square metres of space. C/O Berlin presents works by national and international artists, supports emerging talents, and organizes educational events on visual media and art. It was founded in 2000 by Stephan Erfurt, Marc Naroska and Ingo Pott and originally located in the old Royal Post Office (Postfuhramt). C/O Berlin is supported by a non-profit foundation under the direction of Stephan Erfurt. The deputy chairman is Dr. Andreas Behr.

== Mission ==
C/O Berlin puts on its own exhibitions and realizes projects in cooperation with national and international art institutions, such as the Metropolitan Museum of Art in New York, Albertina Museum Wien, Fotomuseum Winterthur, Fundación Mapfre in Madrid, Sprengel Museum in Hanover, and Museum Folkwang in Essen. With over 180 exhibitions and numerous publications since its founding in 2000, C/O Berlin is known as one of the most active and renowned photographic institutions. Since November 2024, Sophia Greiff and Boaz Levin are responsible for the artistic program. Co-founder and artistic director Marc Naroska is responsible for the corporate identity of the C/O Berlin brand. As of May 2021, the C/O Berlin Foundation's board of trustees is composed of Katja Eichinger (chairwoman), Frank Briegmann, Nico Hofmann, Burkhard Kieker, Simone Menne, Marc Naroska (co-founder), Ingo Pott (co-founder), and Charlotte Rampling. C/O Berlin is financed by ticket sales, book sales, sponsorships, project grants, and donations, as well as funds from the supporters' association C/O Berlin Friends. Since 2020, C/O Berlin is also supported by the state of Berlin.

== Location ==
From 2000 to 2014 C/O Berlin was located in the old Royal Post Office (Postfuhramt), "a stunning, elaborate brick building dating from 1881". In 2014, it moved to Amerika Haus Berlin in Charlottenburg where it has near 2,500 square metres of space.

== History ==
=== Founding ===
C/O Berlin started as a private initiative in 2000. The "c/o" in its name stands for the postal abbreviation "care of" and references the former Royal Post Office (Postfuhramt) in the Mitte district of Berlin, where C/O Berlin celebrated its first public show with a retrospective on the photo agency magnum.

=== Linienstraße ===
When Deutsche Post leased the Postfuhramt in 2001, C/O Berlin moved into a former foundry at Linienstraße 144 in the Berlin district of Mitte. Up until 2006, in a space of around 1000 m^{2} across four floors, C/O Berlin presented exhibitions with works by René Burri, Barbara Klemm, James Nachtwey, Gilles Peress, Margaret Bourke-White, and Tom Wood, among others.

=== Postfuhramt ===
After years of vacancy, Deutsche Post sold the Postfuhramt to a private investor. The founders of C/O Berlin were able to convince them to temporarily use part of the building. In June 2006, C/O Berlin relocated back to the Postfuhramt. During the following years, C/O Berlin presented numerous solo exhibitions in the space of around 1800 m^{2}, including Sibylle Bergemann, Larry Clark, Gregory Crewdson, Leonard Freed, Nan Goldin, Thomas Hoepker, Annie Leibovitz, Peter Lindbergh, Robert Mapplethorpe, Arnold Newman, Martin Parr, and Bettina Rheims. The sale of the building to a Berlin-based biotech company ended C/O Berlin's temporary use of the premises. On March 9, 2013, C/O Berlin bid farewell to the Mitte district of Berlin with a big party.

=== Amerika Haus ===
With support from the Berlin Senate Department for Culture, C/O Berlin was able to sign a long-term rental contract at Amerika Haus as sole proprietor on December 12, 2012. Amerika Haus was built in 1956/57 based on a sketch by SOM Chicago and plans by the architect Bruno Grimmek. With its library, movie theater, and exhibition spaces, It served as a center for culture and information for the United States in Berlin until 2006. The renovation of the historic building was made possible under the direction of the architecture firm B19 Holger Sack. After 18 months C/O Berlin was able to reopen as an exhibition space for photography at its new location in Amerika Haus on October 30, 2014.

In 2015, C/O Berlin received the Association of German Architects' BDA Award Berlin for its sensitive renovation and revitalization of Amerika Haus.

== Exhibitions ==
C/O Berlin presents up to twelve exhibitions each year, featuring works by renowned photographers such as

- Daidō Moriyama, 2023
- Jochen Lempert, 2023
- Farah Al Qasimi, 2023
- William Eggleston, 2023
- Susan Meiselas, 2022
- Bieke Depoorter, 2022
- Nadine Ijewere, 2021
- Lee Friedlander, 2021
- Harald Hauswald, 2021
- Francesca Woodman, 2020
- Linda McCartney, 2020
- Robert Frank, 2019
- Boris Mikhailov, 2019
- Nobuyoshi Araki, 2018
- Sebastião Salgado, 2018
- Anton Corbijn, 2015
- Irving Penn, 2018
- Larry Clark, 2012
- Anton Corbijn
- Larry Fink
- John Gossage
- Annie Leibovitz, 2009
- Peter Lindbergh, 2010
- Danny Lyon
- Robert Mapplethorpe
- Will McBride
- Anja Niedringhaus
- Stephen Shore

C/O Berlin find and promote new photographers with its yearly C/O Berlin Talent Award.

== C/O Berlin Talent Award ==
C/O Berlin has supported more than 80 prizewinners since 2006, including the artists Anna Ehrenstein, Karolina Wojtas, Sasha Kurmaz, Pepa Hristova, Willem Popelier, Stefanie Moshammer, Sebastian Stumpf, and Tobias Zielony, as well as the theorists Florian Ebner, Dr. Katja Müller-Helle, and Dr. Steffen Siegel. C/O Berlin is the only institution in Europe to offer a support program for emerging talent in both art and theory. Since 2018, C/O Berlin has been presenting the annual C/O Berlin Talent Award, rewarding the winner with prize money, a solo exhibition, and a publication.

== Education ==
The Education area complements C/O Berlin's program, covering the area of visual training and art education. Within the four categories Junior, Teens, Adults, and Perspectives, C/O Berlin runs multi-day workshops offering education in photography, film, and design.

== Awards ==
- 2015: Berlin BDA Prize, Association of German Architects (Bund Deutscher Architekten)
