= Berlin University of the Arts =

Art school in Berlin, Germany

- Universität der Künste Berlin
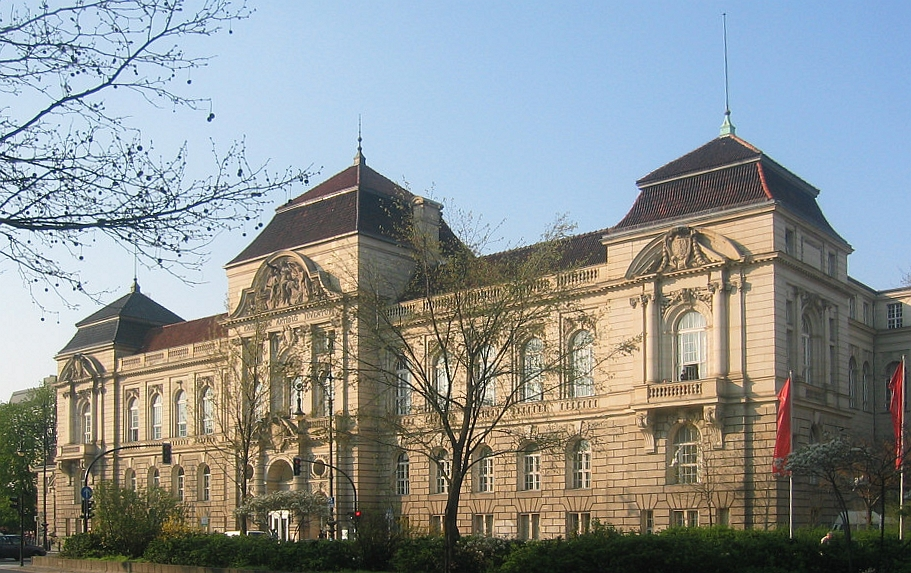
- Type: Public
- Established: 1696; 330 years ago
- Budget: € 95.5 million
- President: Markus Hilgert
- Academic staff: 473
- Administrative staff: 329
- Students: 3,535
- Location: Berlin, Germany; 52°30′33″N 13°19′37″E
- Campus: Urban
- Website: www.udk-berlin.de

The Universität der Künste Berlin (UdK; also known in English as the Berlin University of the Arts), situated in Berlin, Germany, is the second largest art school in Europe. It is a public art and design school, and one of the four research universities in the city.

The university is known for being one of the biggest and most diversified universities of the arts worldwide. It has four colleges specialising in fine arts, architecture, media and design, music and the performing arts with around 3,500 students. Thus the UdK is one of only three universities in Germany to unite the faculties of art and music in one institution. The teaching offered at the four colleges encompasses the full spectrum of the arts and related academic studies in more than 40 courses. Having the right to confer doctorates and post-doctoral qualifications, Berlin University of the Arts is also one of Germany's few art colleges with full university status.

Outstanding professors and students at all its colleges, as well as the steady development of teaching concepts, have publicly defined the university as a high standard of artistic and art-theoretical education. Almost all the study courses at Berlin University of the Arts are part of a centuries-old tradition. Thus Berlin University of the Arts gives its students the opportunity to investigate and experiment with other art forms in order to recognise and extend the boundaries of their own discipline, at an early stage of rigorously selected artists and within the protected sphere of a study course.

Within the field of visual arts, the university is known for the competitive selection of its students. The growth of applicants worldwide has increased during the years due to Berlin's current role in cultural innovation globally. The University of the Arts is prominent in the areas of Visual Arts, Fashion Design, Industrial Design, and Experimental Design.

== History ==
The university's origins date back to the foundation of Academie der Mal-, Bild- und Baukunst (Academy of the Art of Painting, Pictorial Art, and Architecture), the later Prussian Academy of Arts, at the behest of Elector Frederick III of Brandenburg. The two predecessor organisations were Königliche Akademische Hochschule für ausübende Tonkunst (Royal Academy of Musical Performing Art) established in 1869 under Joseph Joachim, which also had adopted the tradition of the famous Stern Conservatory, and the Berlin State School of Fine Arts founded in 1875.

In 1975, both art schools merged under the name Hochschule der Künste Berlin, HdK. The organization received the title of a university on 1 November 2001.

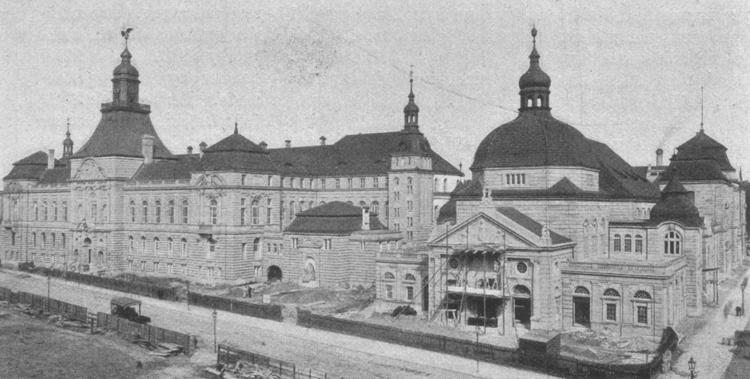
Main Building in 1902

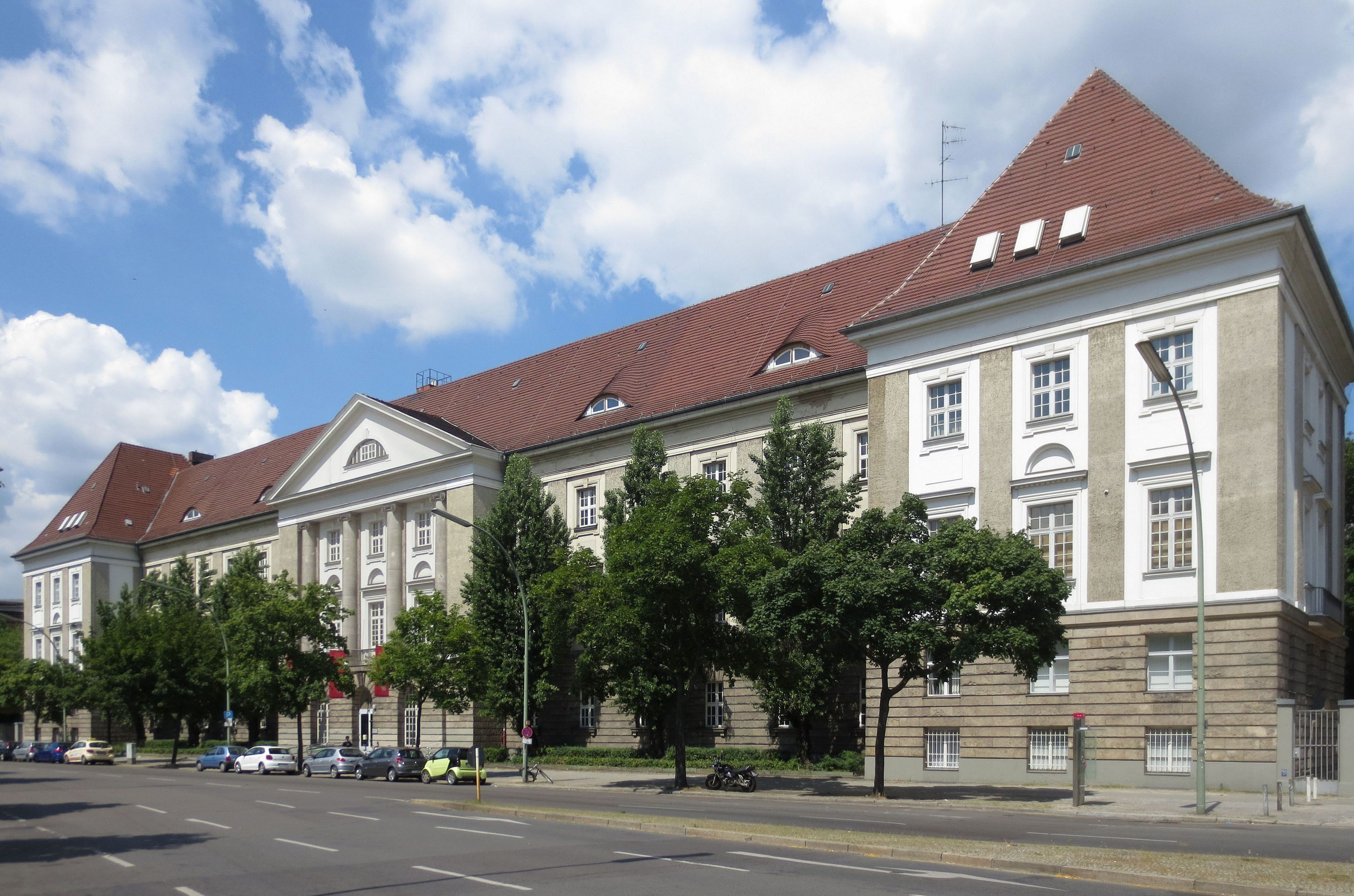
Media House

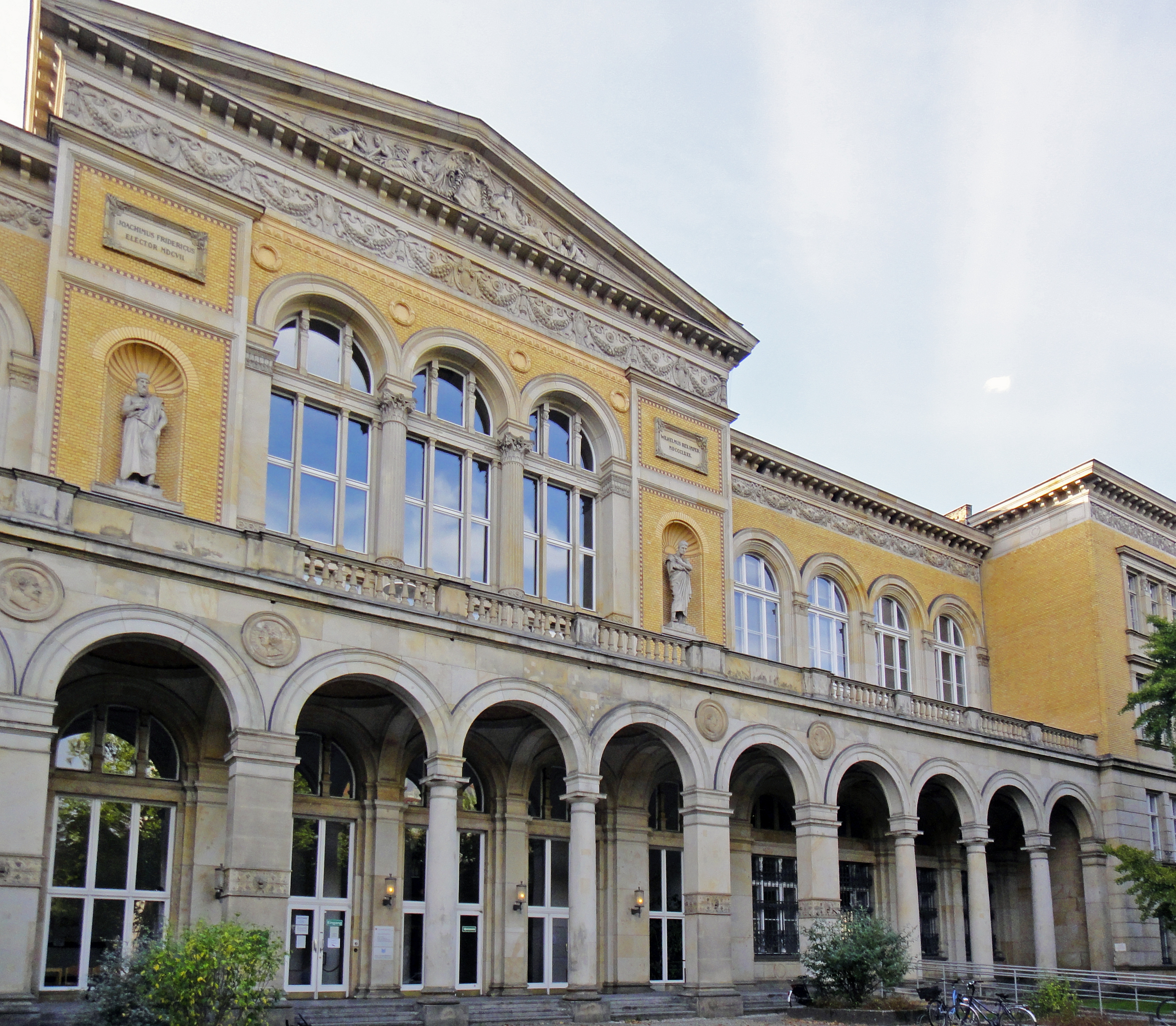
Joachimsthaler Gymnasium

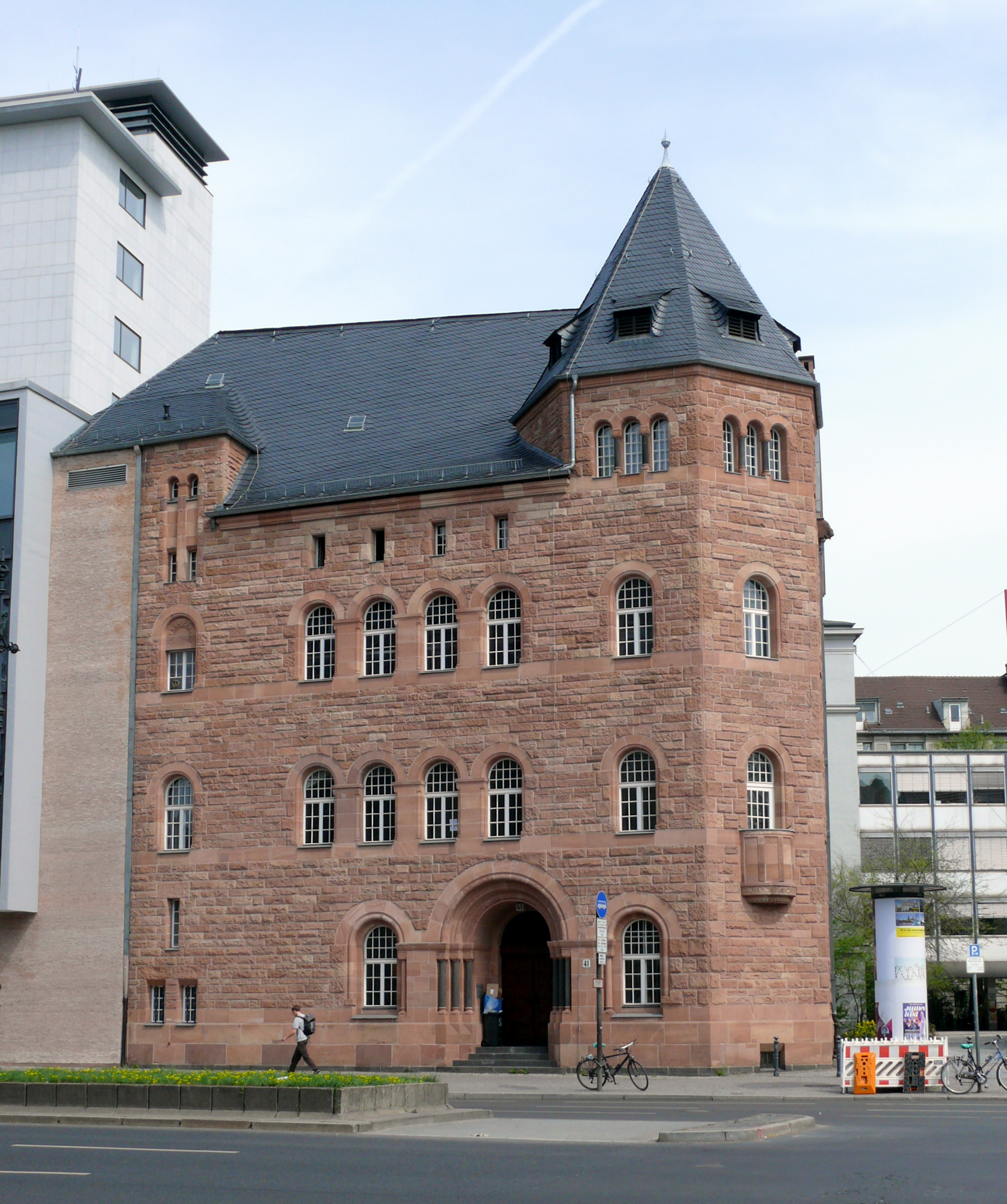
Institute for Church Music

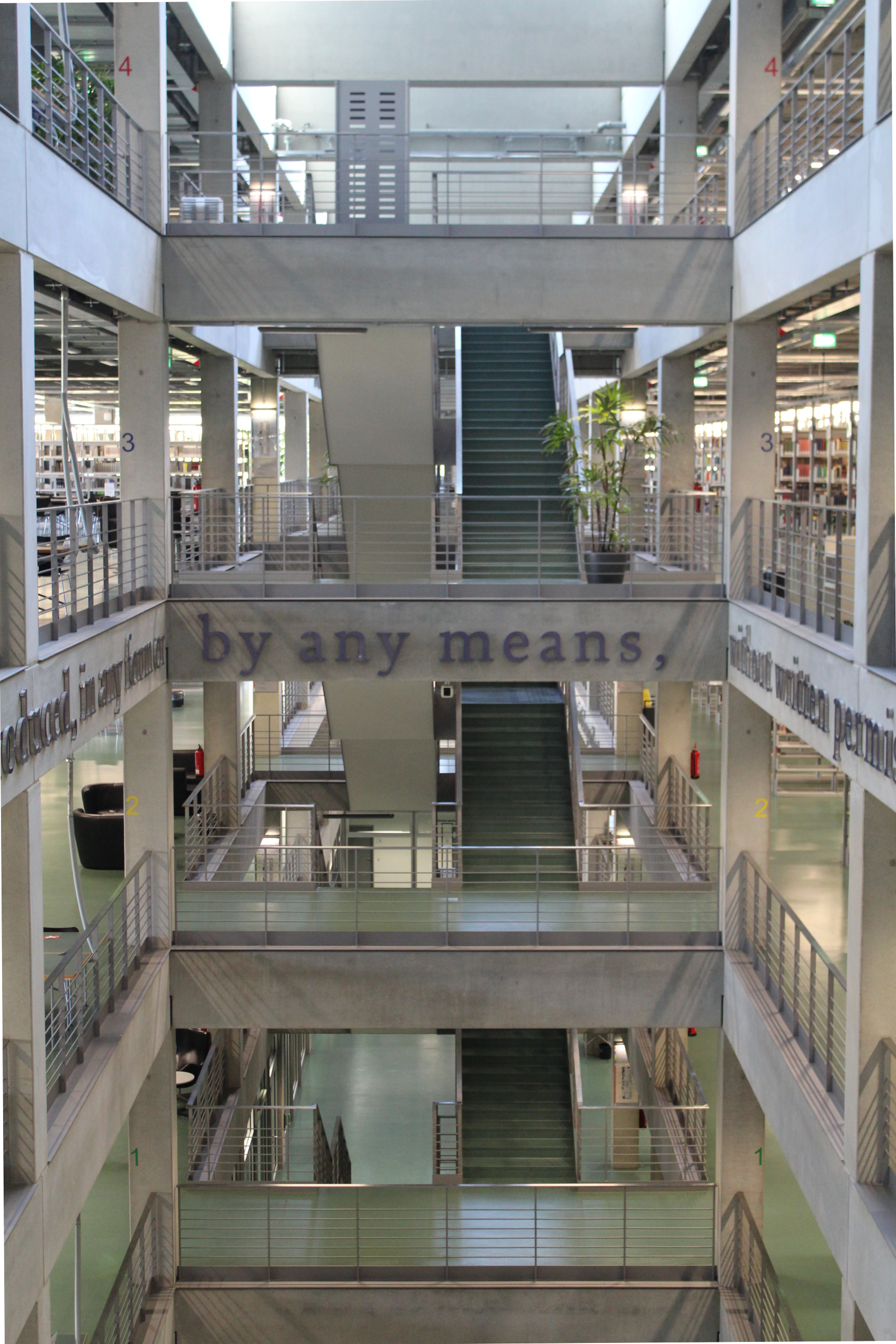
Main Library

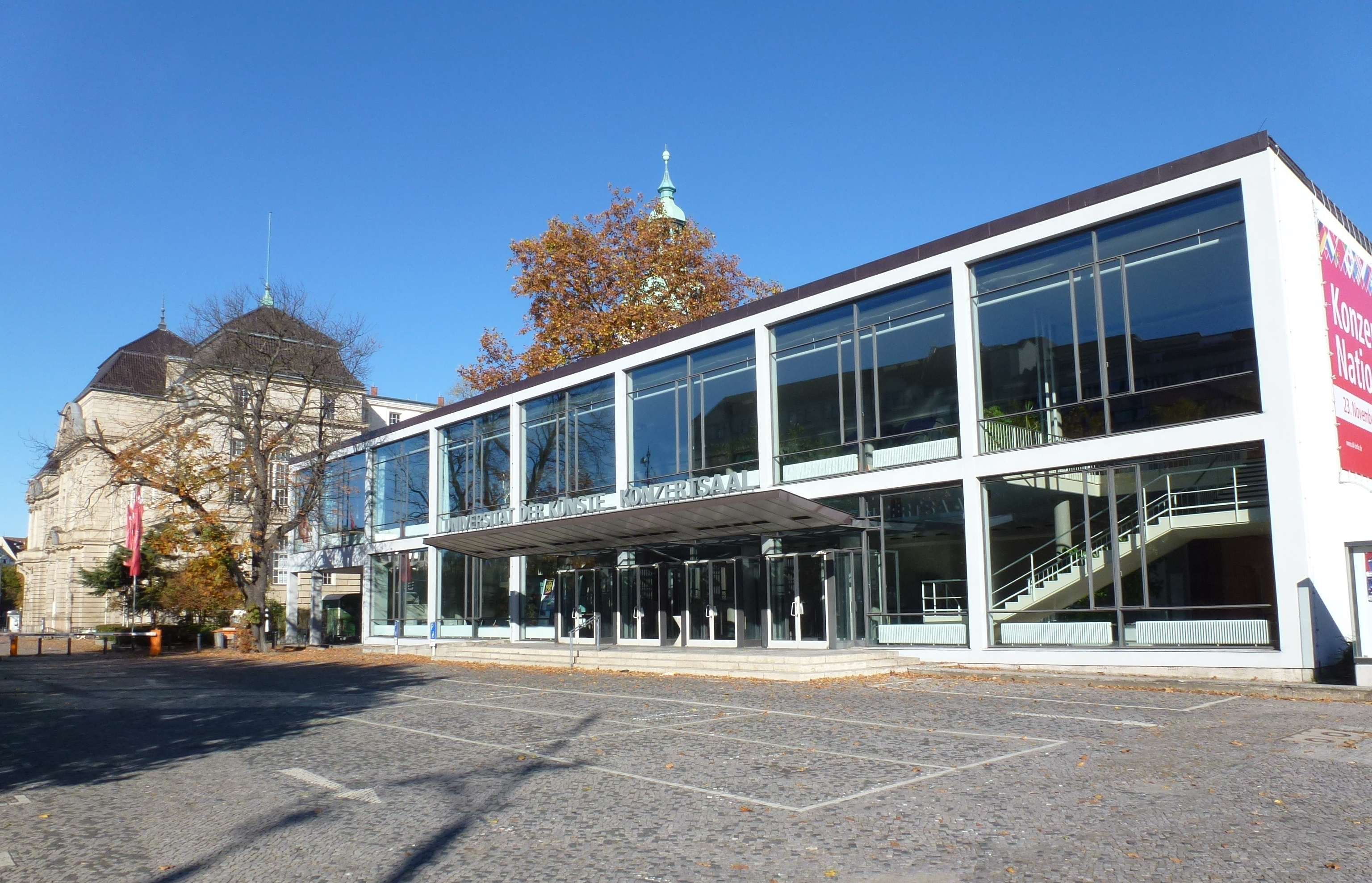
UDK Concert Hall

== Exchange program ==
The exchange program with UDK is a direct enrollment program offered during the fall, spring, and academic year to students interested in the arts and with four semesters of German language study. Each academic year the school receives 100 exchange students on the basis of institutional agreements. Students participating in the exchange are required to subsidize their own accommodations with little help from the school.

== Art fair ==
Annually, the university opens its doors to the public in its four colleges (UdK Rundgang), offering one of the most important art fairs in Berlin due to new proposals that highlight its young artists.

== Notable alumni ==
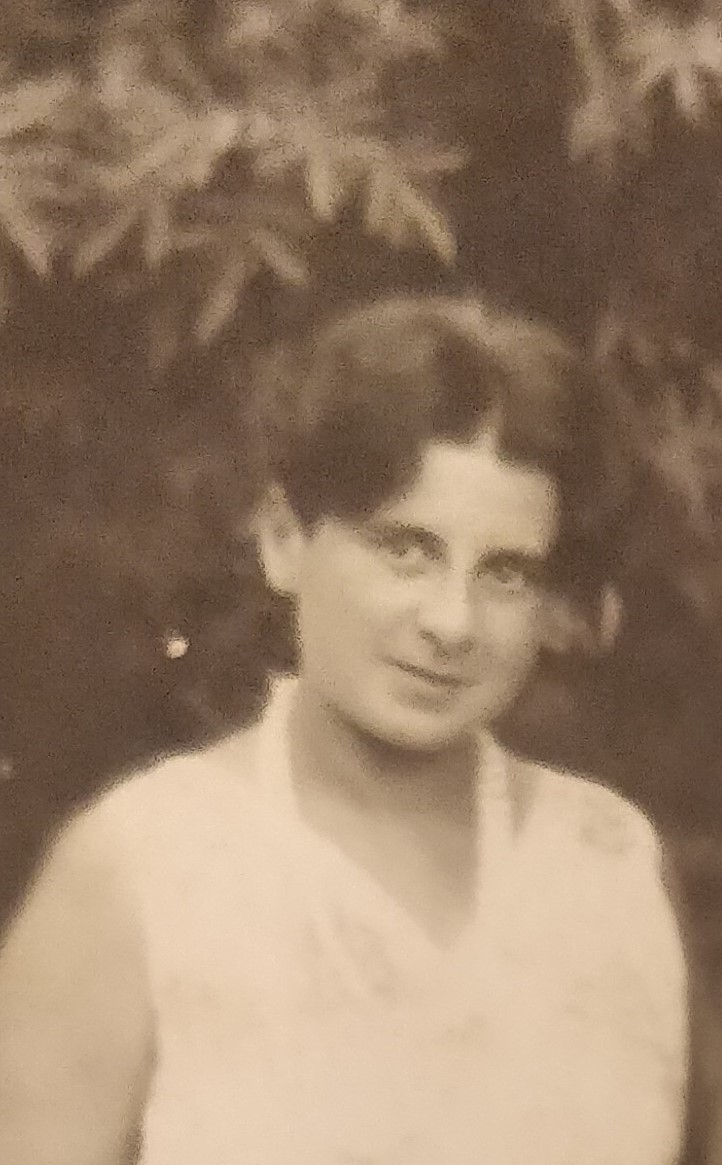
Esther Berlin-Joel

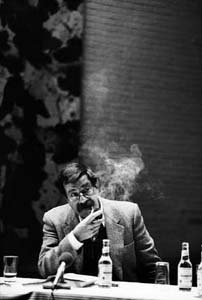
Günter Grass, Nobel laureate in Literature

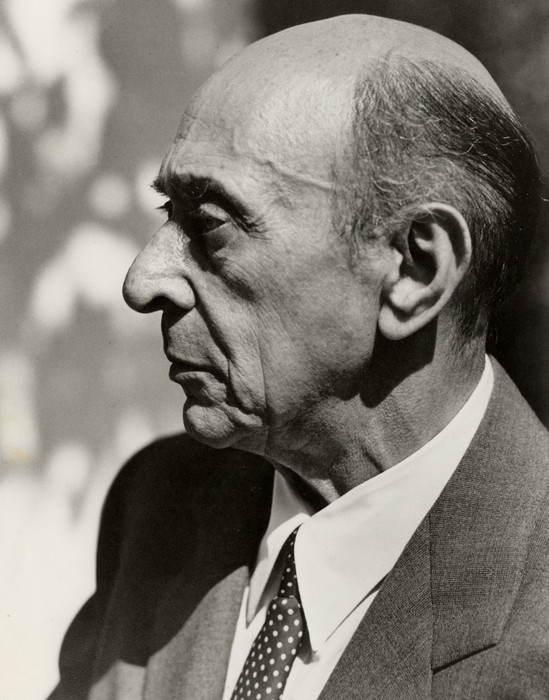
Arnold Schoenberg

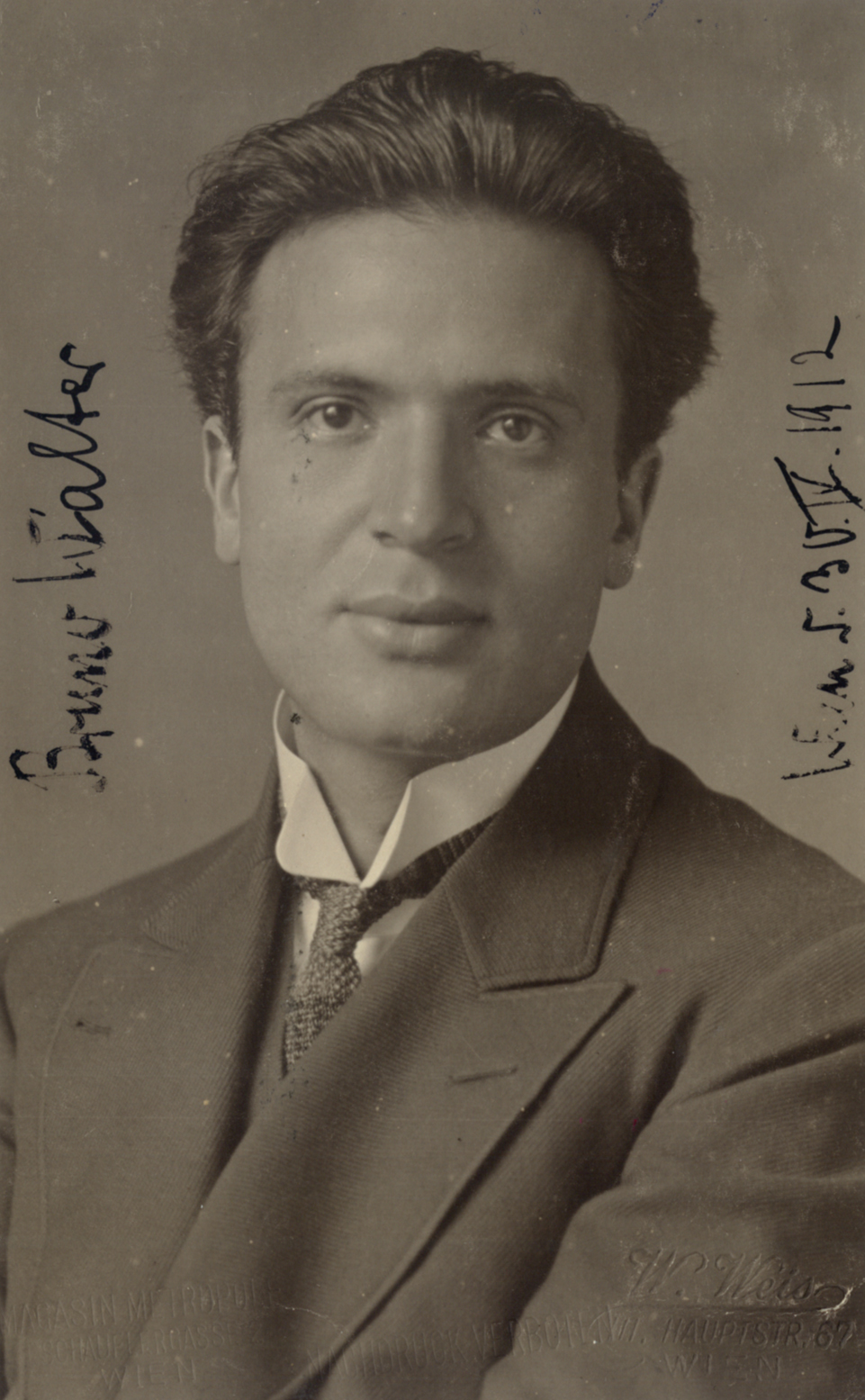
Bruno Walter

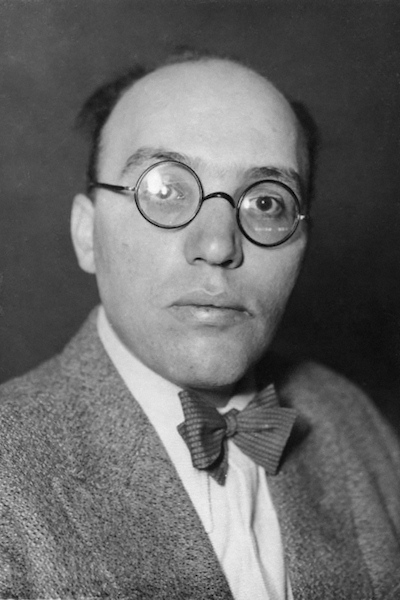
Kurt Weill in 1932

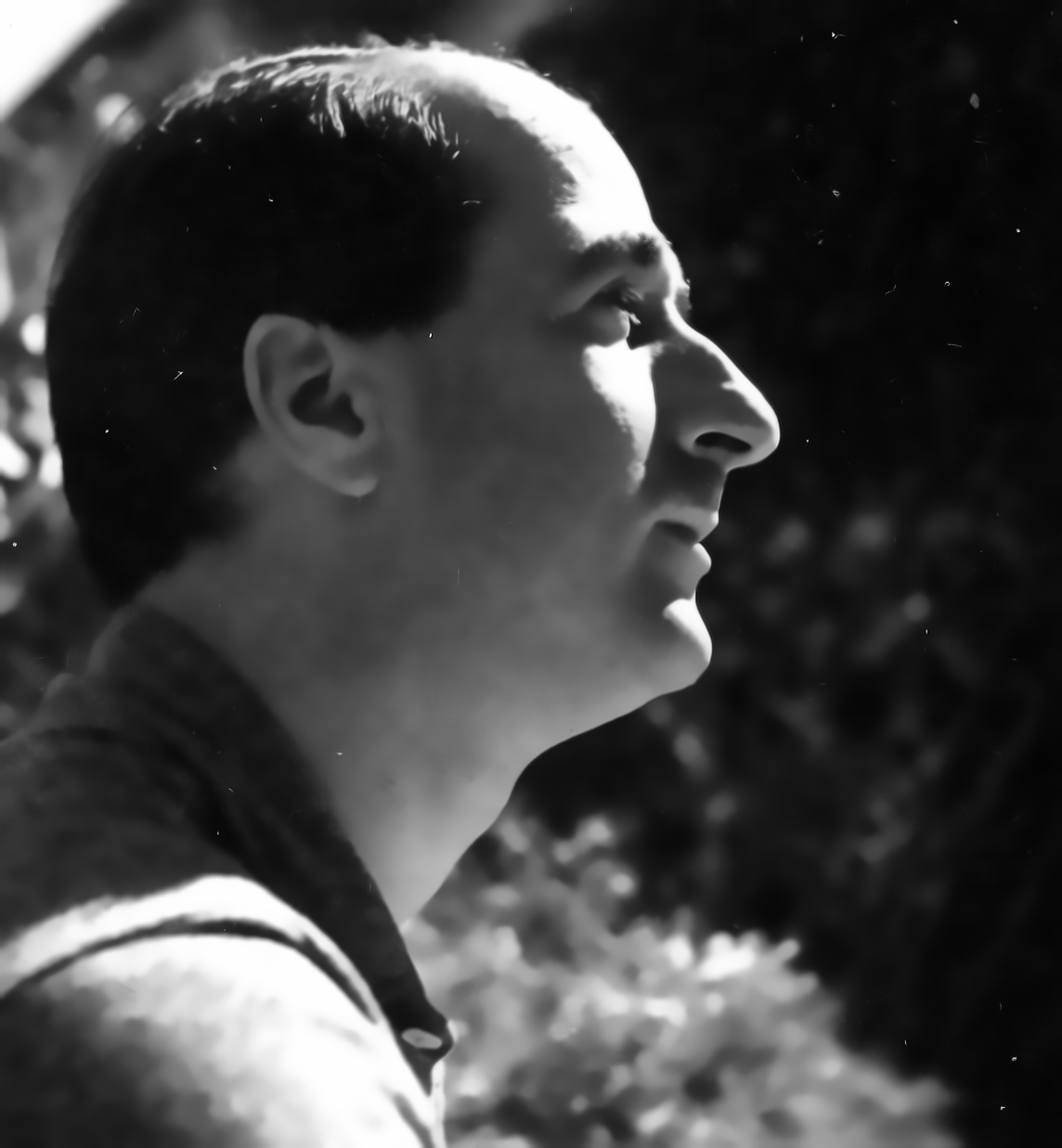
Stefan Wolpe

- Claudio Arrau (1903-1991), Chilean and American pianist
- Claudia Barainsky, soprano
- Else Berg (1877–1942), German-born Dutch painter
- Esther Berlin-Joel (1895–1972), German-born Israeli painter and graphic designer
- F. W. Bernstein (1938–2018), poet, cartoonist, satirist and academic
- Norbert Bisky, painter
- Jacob Brandenburg (1899-1981), Polish-born Israeli sculptor
- Guy Braunstein (born 1971), Israeli-American composer, conductor, and classical violinist
- Antonia Brico, pianist and conductor
- Kai Bumann (1961–2022), conductor
- Michael Chapman, artist
- Antonio Piedade da Cruz, (1895–1982) Indian painter and sculptor
- Daniela Comani, painter
- Alexander Davidis, television director
- Gunter Demnig (born 1947), artist
- Marie Fillunger, opera singer
- Caroline Fischer, pianist
- Bruno Flierl, architect and city planner
- Eduard Franck
- Regina Frank, textile artist
- Catherine Gayer, coloratura soprano
- Ria Ginster, soprano
- Leopold Godowsky, pianist
- Berthold Goldschmidt (1903–1996), composer
- Günter Grass, sculptor, 1999 Nobel Prize in Literature
- Ilse Häfner-Mode (1902-1973), artist
- Burkhard Held, painter
- Carla Henius, mezzo-soprano
- Philip A. Herfort, violinist, orchestra leader
- Arnulf Herrmann, composer
- Li Hua, artist
- Hanoch Jacoby (1909–1990), Israeli composer and viola player
- Ali Kaaf, artist
- David Kaplan (born 1983), American piano soloist and chamber musician
- Leo Kestenberg (1882–1962). German-Israeli classical pianist, music educator, and cultural politician
- Lilli Kuschel, artist, filmmaker
- Ingo Kühl, painter, sculptor and architect
- Christian Leden, ethno-musicologist; composer
- Kim Yusob, South-Korean painter
- Otto Kinkeldey, (1878–1966), musicologist, academic music library pioneer
- Otto Klemperer, conductor
- Günter Kochan (1930–2009), composer
- Uwe Kröger, actor, singer
- Felicitas Kukuck, composer
- Josephine Meckseper, artist
- Una H. Moehrke, painter
- Moritz Moszkowski, German-Polish pianist, composer
- Isabel Mundry, composer
- Adolfo Odnoposoff, cellist
- Karl Oppermann, painter
- Rudolph Polk, violinist
- Enno Poppe, composer
- Hildegard Quiel, composer
- Max Raabe artist
- Hermann Rosendorff, conductor, composer
- SEO, artist
- Herbert Schachtschneider (1919–2008), operatic tenor
- Gabriel and Maxim Shamir, (previously Scheftelovich), early 1930s, Latvian-Israeli graphic artists
- Christine Schäfer, soprano
- Karl Ulrich Schnabel (1909–2001), Austrian pianist
- Arnold Schoenberg (1874–1951), Austrian and American composer, music theorist, teacher, and writer
- Martina Schumacher, painter
- Maya Shenfeld, Jerusalem-born composer and musician
- Paul Gutama Soegijo, composer and musician
- Kathrin Sonntag, artist
- Thomas Spiegelhalter, academic
- Agnes Stavenhagen, soprano
- Bertha Tideman-Wijers, composer
- Sarah Traubel, soprano
- Richard Aaker Trythall, pianist, composer
- Agnes Tschetschulin, composer, violinist
- Christa Frieda Vogel, photographer
- Jorinde Voigt, artist
- Ignatz Waghalter, composer, conductor
- Bruno Walter (born Bruno Schlesinger), conductor
- Kurt Weill, German-born American composer
- Stefan Wolpe (1902–1972), German-born American composer.
- Wang Xiaosong, artist
- Isang Yun (1917-1995), composer

== Notable teachers ==
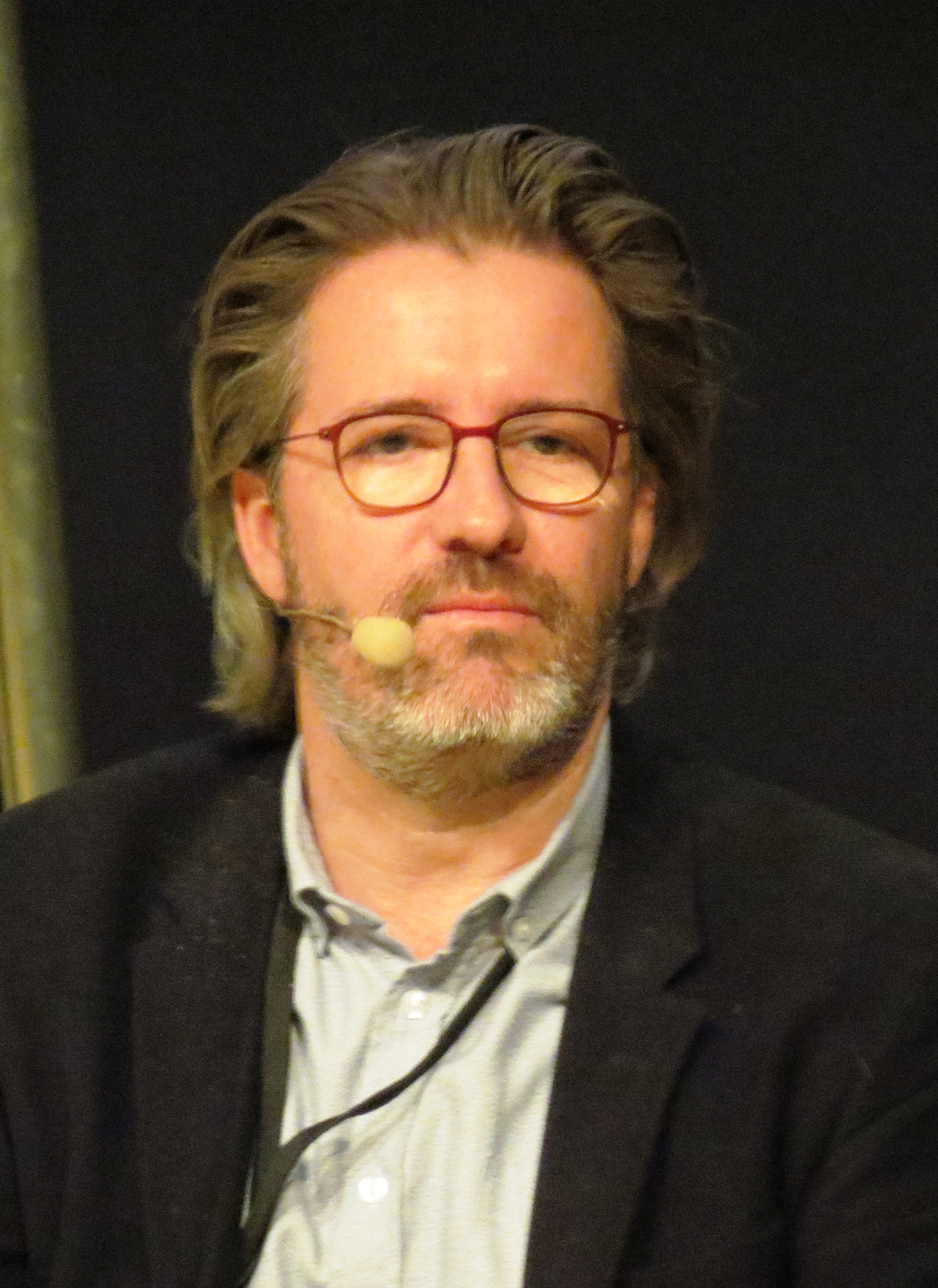
Olafur Eliasson

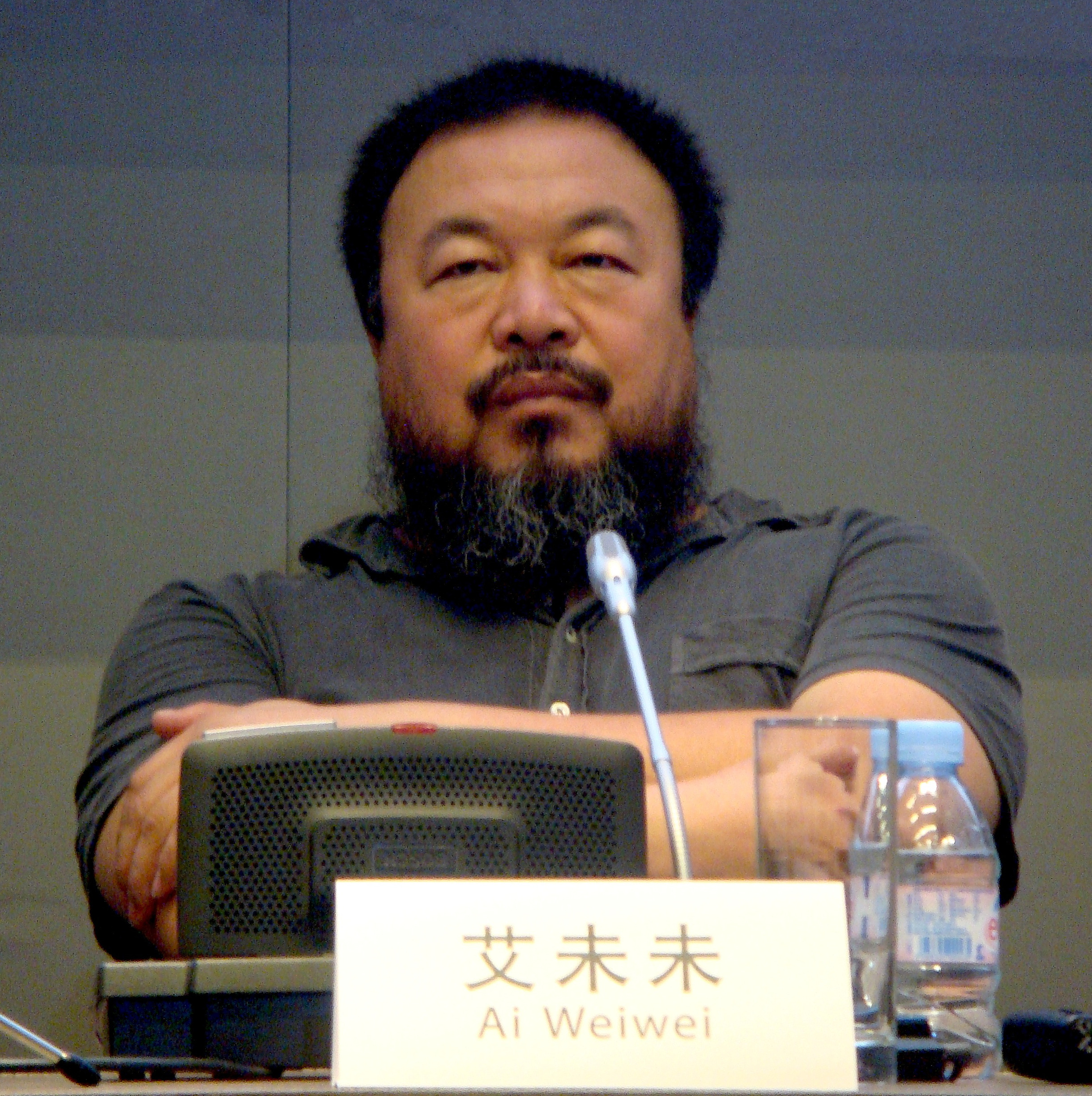
Ai Weiwei

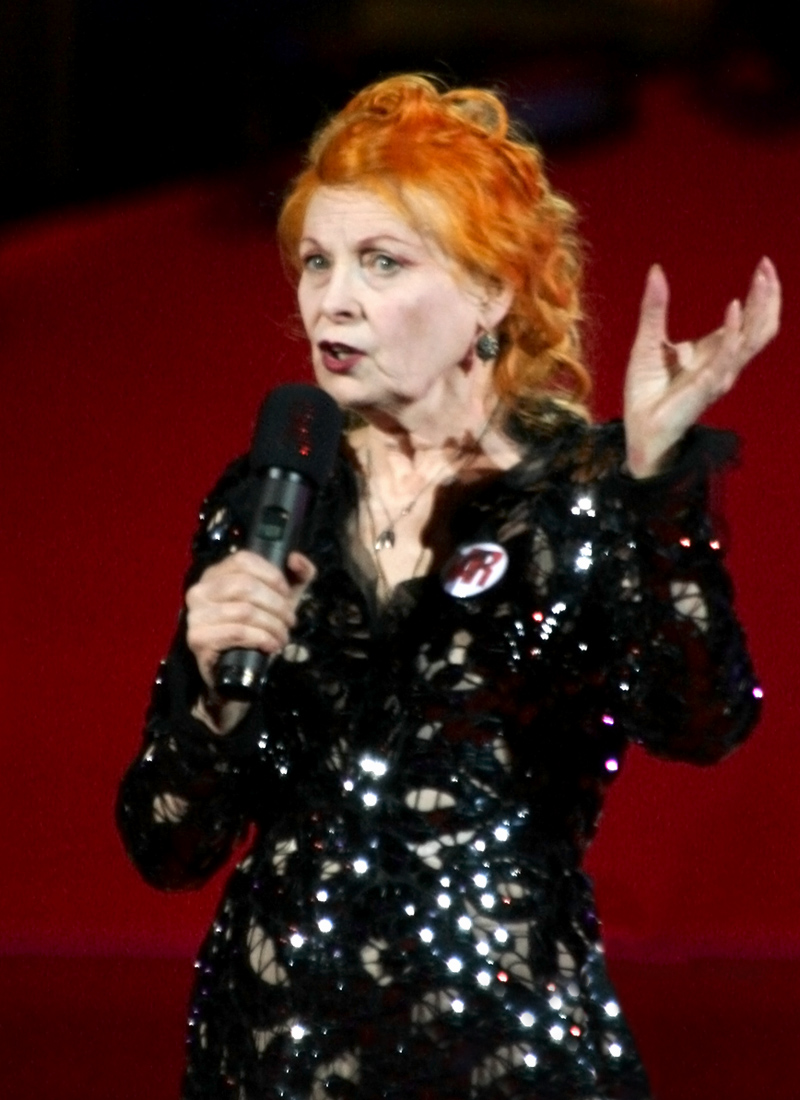
Vivienne Westwood

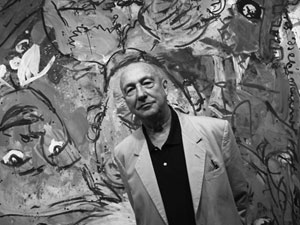
Georg Baselitz
- Shinkichi Tajiri 1969 -
- Ineke Hans 2017 –
- Hito Steyerl
- Ai Weiwei 2012–
- Joseph Ahrens 1945–1969
- Eunhee Baek 2019–
- Georg Baselitz −2005
- F. W. Bernstein, (1984–1999)
- Jolyon Brettingham Smith 1977–1981
- Beatrix Borchard
- Siegfried Borris
- Katharina Sieverding
- John Burgan 1996–2001
- Massimo Carmassi
- Tony Cragg −2006
- Pascal Devoyon 1996–
- Olafur Eliasson 2009–2014
- Heinz Emigholz
- Valérie Favre 2006–
- Emanuel Feuermann 1929–1933
- Friedrich Goldmann 1991–2005
- Christian Grube 1973–
- Elisabeth Grümmer 1965–1986
- Byung-Chul Han 2012–
- Pál Hermann 1902–1944
- Fons Hickmann 2007–
- Paul Hindemith 1895–1963
- Karl Hofer
- Leiko Ikemura
- Amalie Joachim
- Joseph Joachim 1869–1907
- Gesche Joost 2011–
- Mark Lammert 2011–
- Axel Kufus 2004 –
- Lula Mysz-Gmeiner 1920–1945
- Aurèle Nicolet 1926–
- Corinna von Rad
- Daniel Richter 2005–2006
- Max Rostal 1928–1933
- Joachim Sauter 1991–2021
- Arnold Schoenberg 1922–1933
- Ernst Gerold Schramm
- Clara Schumann 1819–1896
- Laszlo Simon 1981–2009
- Walter Stöhrer
- Karl Oppermann 1971-1996
- Witold Szalonek 1973–?
- Leo van Doeselaar 1995–2019
- Jean-Philippe Vassal 2012–
- Vivienne Westwood 1993–2005
- Josef Wolfsthal 1926–1931
- Ji-Yeoun You 2009–
- Isang Yun (composer) 1970–85
- Siegfried Zielinski 2007–
- Walter Zimmermann 1993–
- Thomas Zipp 2008–

== See also ==
- Spandauer Kirchenmusikschule, which became part of the Musikhochschule Berlin in 1998
- Universities and research institutions in Berlin
- Humboldt University of Berlin
- Technische Universität Berlin
- University of Potsdam
