= Adventure in Music =

1944 film by Reginald LeBorg

- Directed by: Reginald LeBorg; Ernst Matray
- Produced by: Walter Lowendahl; Rudolph Polk
- Starring: José Iturbi; Emanuel Feuermann; Mildred Dilling
- Cinematography: Paul Ivano; Harry Jackson; Walter Lundin; Jackson Rose
- Edited by: Tom Biggart; Harvey Pergament; Richard G. Wray
- Distributed by: Crystal Films (US); Monarch Film Corporation (UK)
- Release date: 1944
- Running time: 62 minutes
- Country: United States
- Language: English

Adventure in Music is a 1944 American concert film directed by Reginald LeBorg and Ernst Matray. It stars José Iturbi, Emanuel Feuermann, and Mildred Dilling.

The film was advertised as the "first concert in film" and featured compositions by several classical artists, including Alexander Borodin, Antonín Dvořák, Frédéric Chopin, Ludwig van Beethoven, Franz Liszt, and Nikolai Rimsky-Korsakov. The film also featured works by contemporary composers. There are ten compositions in total.

== Reception ==
Showmen's Trade Review wrote that there is no plot, but rather "a collection of musical pieces played as in a concert and caught on celluloid." The review also noted that "only those who are concert devotees will go to see this." Meanwhile, The New York Times wrote that the film "has the static quality of a family album".

Director Reginald LeBorg, in his own retrospective appraisal, dismissed the film as unworthy of serious analysis. Film critic Wheeler Winston Dixon reports that "the film opened in New York to dismissive reviews, and swiftly sank from sight."
