= Ali Kaaf =

German-Syrian visual artist

- Born: 1977 (age 48–49); Oran, Algeria
- Known for: visual art
- Website: alikaaf.com

Ali Kaaf (born 1977 in Oran, Algeria) is a visual artist living and working in Berlin.

== Education ==
Kaaf studied Visual Art from 1994 to 1998 at the Institut des Beaux-Arts in Beirut and at the Universität der Künste Berlin (UdK) from 2000 to 2005. under the supervision of Marwan Kassab-Bachi and Rebecca Horn.

== Career ==
In 2022, Kaaf's installation I Am a Stranger: Twofold a Stranger was exhibited at the Museum of Islamic Art in the Pergamon Museum Berlin. The installation is an interpretation of the 8th century Islamic Mshatta Façade.

Kaaf has presented his work in artist talks, lectures, and workshops at Montana State University Billings (2019) and the British Museum in London (2019) where he participated in the symposium Syria and Yemen: making art today with Anna Wallace-Thompson, Buthayna Ali, Fadi Yazigi, and Kevork Mourad. In 2020, Kaaf was awarded The Artist in Residence Program of Germany’s Foreign Ministry in cooperation with the Regional Association of Berlin Galleries. It was the first in-house residence program of a German ministry. Between 2015–22 Kaaf was a lecturer at the *foundationClass in Weißensee Academy of Art Berlin, Germany.

== Work ==
Kaaf’s artistic language draws formal parallels to post-war European avant-garde figures like Lucio Fontana (spatial cuts), Alberto Burri (burned surfaces), and Arte Povera (raw materials). His use of these techniques does not signal a return to modernist formalism, but rather a post-conceptual themes of architecture, migration and identity.

Kaaf’s artistic process is not illustrative but epistemological: the voids, scars, and absences in his works function as traces of invisible violence, echoing a condition of geopolitical and existential displacement.

Kaaf’s works engage in dialogue with cultures and disciplines and, beyond them, through interdisciplinary collaborations, to Gesamtkunstwerke, syntheses of the arts. Examples include a 2018 video installation on 48 Variations for Two Pianos by John McGuire (Festival ME_MMIX 2018) in the Es Baluard Museum for Modern and Contemporary Art in Palma; in 2015, Intima, a dance project in collaboration with Dawson Dance SF and the choreographer David Dawson, San Francisco, and the composers Ashraf Kateb and Kinan Azmeh; and his ongoing collaboration with the glass artist James Mongrain in Seattle (2011–).

Kaaf’s works include Rift (a collection of works on paper, 2001-ongoing); Helmet (sculpture and glassblowing, 2011-24); I Know the Emptiness of this House, (installation, 2023), Those swept away by the waters / rose up as clouds (video installation in collaboration with filmmaker Khaled Mzher, 2022); Ich bin Fremder. Zweifach Fremder, (installation 2021); The Byzantine Corner, (2018-20); 48 Variations for Two Pianos (video installation in collaboration with John McGuire, 2018); Box of Pain (video installation, 2016); Larynx (glassblowing, 2014); Scherben Mantra (video installation, 2013); Metal (video); Mihrab (graphite and pigment on paper, 2006-08); Ras Ras (photography, 2004-09).

== Exhibitions ==
Kaaf’s work has been exhibited in solo and group exhibitions internationally at Documenta fifteen (Kassel), Doha Design at the Qatar Museums (Doha) Maknana: An Archeology of New Media Art in the Arab World at Diriyah Art Futures (Riyadh); Taswir – Pictorial Mappings of Islam and Modernity at Martin-Gropius-Bau (Berlin); among others in Europe, the Middle East and North America.

Selected Solo Exhibitions

- 2025 The Fire’s Edge, Ayyam Gallery, Dubai, UAE
- 2023 I Know the Emptiness of this House, Darat Al Funun, Amman, Jordan
- 2021 I Am a Stranger: Twofold a Stranger, Museum of Islamic Art, The Pergamon Museum, Berlin, Germany
- 2018 Dins un garbell no es pot guardar el sol, Galeria Maior, Palma, Spain
- 2016 Box of Pain, Kühlhaus Berlin, Germany
- 2007 Schwarz, Galerie Haus am Lützowplatz, Berlin, Germany
- 2004 Aswad, Darat Al Funun – The Khalid Shoman Foundation, Amman, Jordan

Selected Group Exhibitions

- 2025 Maknana: An Archeology of New Media Art in the Arab World. With Susan Hefuna, Mona Hatoum and Walid Raad, among others. Curated by Ala Younis and Haytham Nawar., 2025, Diriyah Art Futures (DAF), Riyadh, KSA
- 2025 Art Dubai, UAE
- 2024 Design Doha Biennial, M7, Qatar Museums, Doha, Qatar
- 2024 Art Dubai, UAE
- 2022 documenta fifteen, Kassel, Germany
- 2022 Downfalls – From Dystopia to Disruption, Kunsthalle Trier, Germany
- 2016 The Red Gaze, Zilberman Gallery, Berlin, Germany
- 2016 As If, At Home, Artists in Europe, Freiraum in der Box, Berlin, Germany
- 2015 “Ortstermin mit Leoni Wirth - Modelle und Entwürfe aus dem Atelier von Leoni Wirth und zeitgenössische Positionen zu Abstraktion und Moderne”, Kunsthaus Dresden, Germany
- 2009 Taswir – Pictorial Mappings of Islam and Modernity, Martin-Gropius-Bau, Berlin, Germany

== Awards and Residencies ==
- 2023 Artist in residence, Darat al Funun, Amman, Jordan
- 2023 KUNSTFONDS_Stipendium, Stiftung Kunstfonds, Bonn, Germany
- 2020 Artist in Residence, Ministry of Foreign Affairs and Landesverband Berliner Galerien (LVBG), Berlin, Germany
- 2015 Artist-in-Residence, Kala Art Institute, Berkeley, California, USA
- 2014 Honorary AIR Awardees, Kala Art Institute, Berkeley, California, USA
- 2010 Young Collectors for MAXXI 2010, Young Collectors Association - Fair ROMA, The Road to Contemporary Art, Rome, Italy
- 2005–2006 Solidere's Artists in Residence Program, Beirut, Lebanon
- 2004 German Academic Exchange Service (DAAD). The prize for Outstanding International Students, assigned by UdK Berlin, Germany

== Collections ==
Kaaf’s work is found in international public collections including:

Public Collections (selection)

- MAXXI - Museo nazionale delle arti del XXI secolo, Roma / MAXXI - Nationalmuseum für die Kunst des XXI. Jahrhunderts, Rome, Italy.
- Staatliche Museen zu Berlin, Germany.
- Darat Al Funun – The Khalid Shoman Foundation in Amman, Jordan.
- Qatar Museums, Doha, Qatar.
- Kala Art Institute, Berkeley, USA.

== Publications ==
- 2023 Der Teil und das Ganze | a monograph by Doris von Drathen via KUNSTFORUM International covering Ali Kaaf's solo exhibition “I Am a Stranger. Twofold a Stranger.” at the Museum for Islamic Art in the Pergamon Museum, Berlin.
- 2022 Ali Kaaf: Ich bin ein Fremder : Zweifach Fremder. (I Am a Stranger. Twofold a Stranger), Hatje Cantz Verlag. Texts by: Doris von Drathen, Golan Haji, Stefan Weber.
- 2013 Arab Art Histories – The Khalid Shoman Collection Book. Edited by Sarah Rogers and Eline van der Vlist (Arabic/English). Published by The Khalid Shoman Foundation. Worldwide distributor: Idea Books, Amsterdam.
- 2009 Taswir. Islamische Bilderwelten und Moderne, by Almut Sh. Bruckstein Coruh and Hendrik Budde (Eds.), Nicolai Verlag.
