= Eunhee Baek =

Eunhee Baek 백은희
- Born: February 18, 1991 (age 35); Seoul, South Korea
- Genre: Classical music
- Occupations: Pianist, pedagogue
- Instruments: Piano
- Labels: Da Vinci Classics, KNS Classical
- Website: www.eunheebaek.com

Eunhee Baek (born 18 February 1991) is a South Korean classical pianist based in Germany. She is known for her recordings of the piano works of Franz Liszt, for which she received the International Liszt Grand Prix du Disque in 2026.

== Early life and education ==
Baek was born in Seoul, South Korea.

She moved to Europe to pursue higher education in music, studying piano at the Berlin University of the Arts (UdK), the Mozarteum University Salzburg, and the Imola International Academy.

== Career ==
Baek's artistic repertoire heavily focuses on the piano compositions of Franz Liszt. Alongside her concert projects, she is undertaking a long-term recording initiative with the Italian classical label Da Vinci Classics to record the complete piano works of Liszt.

In 2024, she released her debut solo album featuring Liszt's complete Harmonies poétiques et religieuses on the KNS Classical label. In September 2026, the Franz Liszt Society in Budapest awarded this recording the International Liszt Grand Prix du Disque.

In 2026, she released her second Liszt album under Da Vinci Classics, which included Années de pèlerinage: Troisième année and the Trois Apparitions.

She actively performs in solo recitals, chamber music concerts, and music festivals across Europe and Asia.

She has taught piano at the Berlin University of the Arts (UdK) since 2019.

== Awards and honors ==
- International Dr. Dichler Competition (Vienna, 2005) — First Prize
- Artur Schnabel Piano Competition (Berlin, 2011) — Second Prize (First Prize not awarded)
- International Competition Pietro Argento (Gioia del Colle, 2011) — First Prize
- Grand Prix International de Piano de Lyon (Lyon) — Laureate
- International Young Virtuoso Competition Mladi virtuoz (Zagreb, 2016) — First Prize and Special Prize for Best Interpretation of a Classical Sonata
- Prof. Dichler Competition, Wiener Musikseminar (Vienna) — Prize Winner
- International Liszt Grand Prix du Disque (Budapest, 2026)

== Discography ==
- Franz Liszt: Harmonies poétiques et religieuses (KNS Classical, 2024)
- Franz Liszt: Piano Music Vol. 1 – Années de pèlerinage (Troisième année) & Trois Apparitions (Da Vinci Classics, 2026)
