= Christa Frieda Vogel =

German photographer

Christa Frieda Vogel is a German photographer who lives and works in Berlin, Germany. She has published several photo books and presented her work in national and international exhibitions.

== Biography ==
Christa Frieda Vogel was born in 1960 in Meppen, Emsland in Germany, and studied graphic design from 1982 to 1988 at what has become the Berlin University of the Arts. While working as a make-up artist she acquired a private pilot license (PPLA, CVFR, KFB). In 2000 she became a founding member of the Fotoschule am Schiffbauerdamm and worked as a curator and exhibition manager at the Postfuhramt Berlin. Travels have led her to Venice, Croatia and North Macedonia, as well as to Georgia and Turkey. In Turkey she lived and worked as a photographer and curator from 2009 to 2013. In 2013 she moved back to Berlin.

== Works ==
Vogel's photography is mostly documentary: In the series (and book) Georgien (Georgia) she photographed people as if they were their own monuments. Her pictorial strategy rests, both in color and black and white images, on the long shot and the central figure. For her exhibition and book project Artistanbul Vogel portrayed 34 fine artists, male and female, of three generations in Istanbul and accompanied them to their favourite places. During the two years of work on this series she established the gallery project Galata House of Art in Beyoğlu which hosts both artists from Berlin and Istanbul. It was there where Vogel presented in 2011 her Artistanbul-series flanked by works of the portrayed, among them Ara Güler, Burhan Doğançay, Mahmut Celayir, Erdoğan Zumrutoğlu and Hande Varsat. Those of Vogel's works which are not primarily documentary, like the polaroids of "Erotica", approach the subjects also by means of close-up and blur. Similar strategies are employed within the "Blaues Wunder" series (Blue Miracle) as a study of the (under-)water world in general whilst the b/w series Jellyfish focuses in particular on the bizarre bodies of the gelatinous creatures.

== Publications ==
- Einblicke. B&S Siebenhaar Verlag, Berlin 2003, ISBN 3-936962-03-0
- Georgien. Begegnung mit Ursprung und Zeit (introductory notes by Alexander Kartosia and Thomas Roth), Edition Braus, Heidelberg 2008, ISBN 978-3-89904-305-1
- Artistanbul: Contemporary Artists Present Their Favourite Places. Seltmann + Söhne, Lüdenscheid 2011 und 2013, ISBN 978-3-934687-95-0 (also exhibition catalogue with an essay by Johannes Odenthal)

== Exhibitions (selection) ==
- 2006 National Gallery Tbilisi, Georgia: virtual art, land art project
- 2007 Caravansary Museum Tbilisi, Georgia: portraits, group exhibition
- 2007 Willy Brandt Haus, Berlin: Portraits und Landschaften (Portraits and Landscapes), group exhibition
- 2008 Art Fair Cologne: Georgienfotos (Photos of Georgia) and book presentation
- 2008 Foundation Sergej Mawritzki, Berlin, book presentation and exhibition: Georgien, Begegnung mit Ursprung und Zeit (Georgia: An Encounter with Origin and Time)
- 2009 Gallery Brockstedt, Berlin: Figur in der Landschaft (Figure in a Landscape), with Ernst Baumeister
- 2010 Gallery Tammen, Berlin: Nudes, polaroid photos, group exhibition
- 2011 Gallery Arte, Istanbul: Ara Güler Portrait, group exhibition
- 2011 Galata House of Art in Beyoğlu, Istanbul, Artistanbul, book presentation and exhibition
- 2011 Galeriartist, Berlin: Artistanbul, book presentation and exhibition
