= 100 Beste Plakate =

Graphic design association

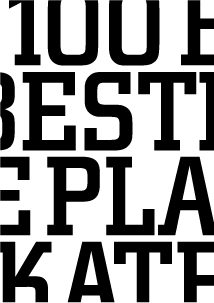
- Established: 2001
- Location: Berlin, Germany
- Staff: Fons Hickmann, Susanne Stahl (president), Hermann Büchner, Jiri Oplatek, Christoph Nardin (board)
- Website: www.100-beste-plakate.de

The association 100 Beste Plakate (transl. 100 Best Posters) e.V. is an interest group for graphics, design and the graphic arts in Germany, Austria and Switzerland. The association was founded with the aim of promoting, awarding and strengthening the public awareness of the high design quality of the poster medium.

== History ==
The 100 Beste Plakate (100 Best Posters) association emerged from the competition Die besten Plakate des Jahres, which was founded in 1966. In 2001, the newly established association took over the organization and realignment of the contest. In the spirit of the European ideal, the contest was expanded to all German-language posters, thus integrating artists from Austria and Switzerland.

Professional associations cooperating with the association are DesignAustria, Alliance Graphique Internationale, the International Council of Graphic Design Associations, the BDG Berufsverband der Deutschen Kommunikationsdesigner e.V. and the AGD. Founding members included Klaus Staeck, Helmut Brade and Volker Pfüller.

== Contest ==
The association organizes a contest annually for the DACH countries. Poster designers, artists, students and printers are invited to submit the best works of the past year. It is also possible for poster clients to nominate them. An annually changing jury of graphic designers selects the 100 best from the submitted posters, which are subsequently awarded and exhibited.

The book 100 Beste Plakate / 100 Best Posters is published to accompany the competition every year.

== Exhibitions ==
The award-winning posters are presented to the public in Berlin (Kulturforum am Potsdamer Platz), Essen, Nuremberg, Lucerne, Zürich and the MAK – Museum of Applied Arts, Vienna as well as other changing locations in multi-week exhibitions. The posters are included in the collections of the Deutsches Plakat Museum (Folkwang Museum) Essen and the MAK.

== Presidents ==
- 2001 to 2007: Niklaus Troxler
- 2007 to 2010: Henning Wagenbreth
- 2010 to 2014: Stephan Bundi
- 2014 to 2018: Götz Gramlich
- since 2018: Fons Matthias Hickmann

== Bibliography ==
- 100 Beste Plakate e.V. (ed.): 100 beste Plakate 18 – Deutschland Österreich Schweiz. Verlag Kettler, 2018, ISBN 978-3862067343.
- Josef Müller-Brockmann: Geschichte des Plakates. Phaidon Press, 2004, ISBN 978-0-7148-4403-9.
- Jens Müller (ed.): Best German Posters Optik Books, 2016, ISBN 978-3-0005-3060-9.
- Fons Hickmann, Sven Lindhorst-Emme (eds.): Anschlag Berlin – Zeitgeistmedium Plakat. Verlag Seltmann+Söhne 2015, ISBN 978-3-9447-2156-9.
