= Alexander Davidis =

Alexander Davidis is a German born television director, writer and producer.

He was born in Germany in 1963 where he went to private boarding school, the Castle Buldern in North Rhine-Westphalia. In Essen, he studied business administrations for two years, then he moved to Berlin to study Social and Commercial Communications at the Universität der Künste Berlin.

After obtaining his master's degree, he moved to New York City in 1989, where he started to work with now Hollywood film director Marcus Nispel (The Texas Chainsaw Massacre) at Nispel's then film production company Portfolio Artists Network. Davidis started out as the in-house Conceptual Art Director. He worked with Nispel on music video. As the company grew he became Creative Director looking after new directors that joined Portfolio switching from photography to music video directing, such as Hans Neleman and David LaChapelle.

Subsequently, Davidis turned director himself. In the early 1990s, he was represented by New York City based Taxi Films and in Europe by Production International that had their main offices in London and Hamburg and more offices in many countries including South Africa. As a result, Davidis became the "traveling director" shooting with the leading advertising agencies in South Africa, Brazil, Sweden, Switzerland, Spain, Portugal, the USA and many more. He won the award for Best Car Commercial at the Portugal Commercial Film Festival 1996.

In the late 1990s, he worked as a conceptual media consultant for the foreign political department of the ZDF, Zweites Deutsches Fernsehen, the biggest broadcaster in Europe as well as The New York Times Television, at the time living in London, from 1998 through 2003. Beginning of 2004 he returned to new New York City.

Davidis is also a still photographer specialized in historic and luxury Automobiles. Davidis's photography was exhibited in the UK in 2004 and in 2005 and in the US in 2005. He won the prestigious Aston Martin Owners Club Klemantaski-Parnell photo award in 2001, 2002, 2003 and 2004.

Alexander Davidis also directs the television series on historic car racing GT Racer. Produced by the John Galt Films, Inc., NYC. GT Racer, Season I was shot for VoomHD. In the USA, GT Racer was called "Classic Racers". Season II was picked up by the Discovery Network and premiered on HD Theater and Discovery HD in 2009. Currently the entire GT
