= Kathrin Sonntag =

Kathrin Sonntag (born 1981) is a visual artist who works in photography, sculpture, film, and installations. Her work has been exhibited in museums including the Kunstverein in Hamburg, Germany and the Solomon R. Guggenheim Museum in New York City.

== Life and work ==
Sonntag earned her BA and MA in Visual Arts at the Berlin University of the Arts in Berlin, Germany, studying under Lothar Baumgarten.

Sonntag's work experiments with perception and new ways of seeing. She often juxtaposes everyday objects with pieces of art and the tools of artists in works that take the form of photography, film, installations, and sculpture. In "Everything and All of That," Sonntag and other artists blurred the boundary between artist studios and galleries. Frankfurter Allgemeine Zeitung described Sonntag's use of illusion as "subtle," and Berliner Zeitung wrote that her exhibit "Double Take" at the Galerie Kamm had visitors "trip over doublings," led visitors into illusions and traps in a manner that is "charming" and shows "a sense of humor."

== Exhibitions ==
=== Solo exhibitions ===
- Heute bleibe ich daheim... (2003, Galerie sphn, Berlin)
- Kathrin Sonntag (2007, white light, Düsseldorf)
- Dracula's Ghost (2009, Galerie Kamm, Berlin)
- Superkalifragilistigexpialigetik (2009, Gesellschaft für Aktuelle Kunst GAK, Bremen)
- Mittnacht (2009, Swiss Institute, New York City)
- ES (2010, annex14, Bern)
- Zum bunten Schwein (2010, with Jan Molzberger, Samsa, Berlin)
- Mühsam ernährt sich das Einhorn (2011, Kunstverein, Hamburg)
- Green Doesn't Matter When You're Blue (2013, Aspen Art Museum, Aspen)
- Abwesen (2013, Pinakothek der Moderne - Schaustelle, Munich)
- I see you seeing me see you (2014, Cooper Gallery, Dundee)
- Things doing their thing (2018/2019, Kindl-Zentrum für zeitgenössische Kunst, Berlin)

=== Group exhibitions ===
- Leopards in the Temple (2010, SculptureCenter, New York)
- Made in Germany (2012, Hannover)
- Everything and All of That (2013, Simone Subai Gallery, New York)
- Goetz Collection at Haus der Kunst, Part 6 (2014, Haus der Kunst, Munich)
- Hausrat (2014, Museum Langmatt, Baden)
- Photo-Poetics (2016, Solomon R. Guggenheim Museum, New York City)

== Awards ==
- 2009: Dr. Georg and Josi Guggenheim Foundation Prize
- 2009: Swiss Art Award
- 2012: DAAD Research Scholarship, New York
- 2013: Stiftung Kunstfonds, Bonn
- 2013: Swiss Art Awards, Basel
