= Karl Oppermann =

German painter

Karl Oppermann (1975)

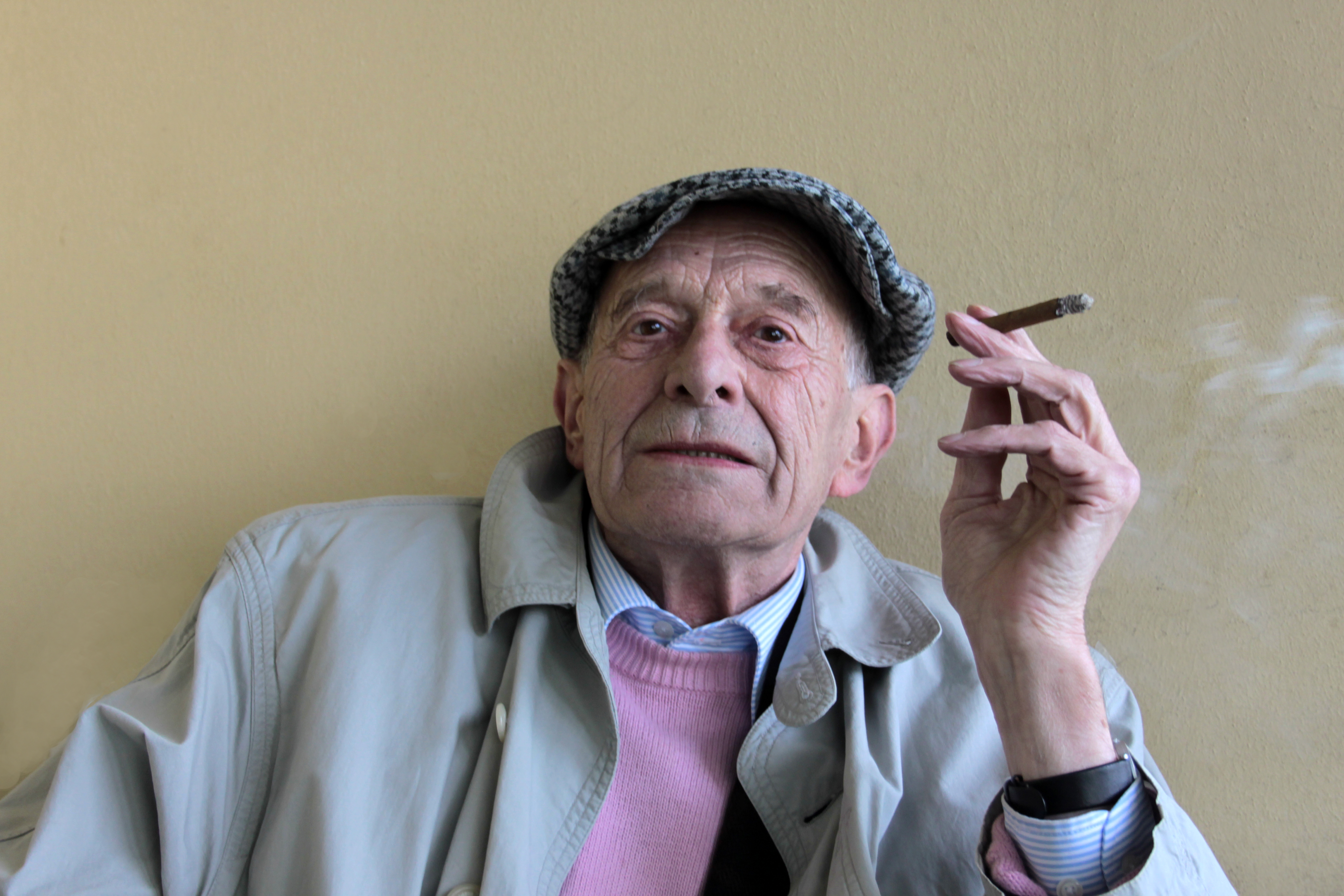
Karl Oppermann (2012)

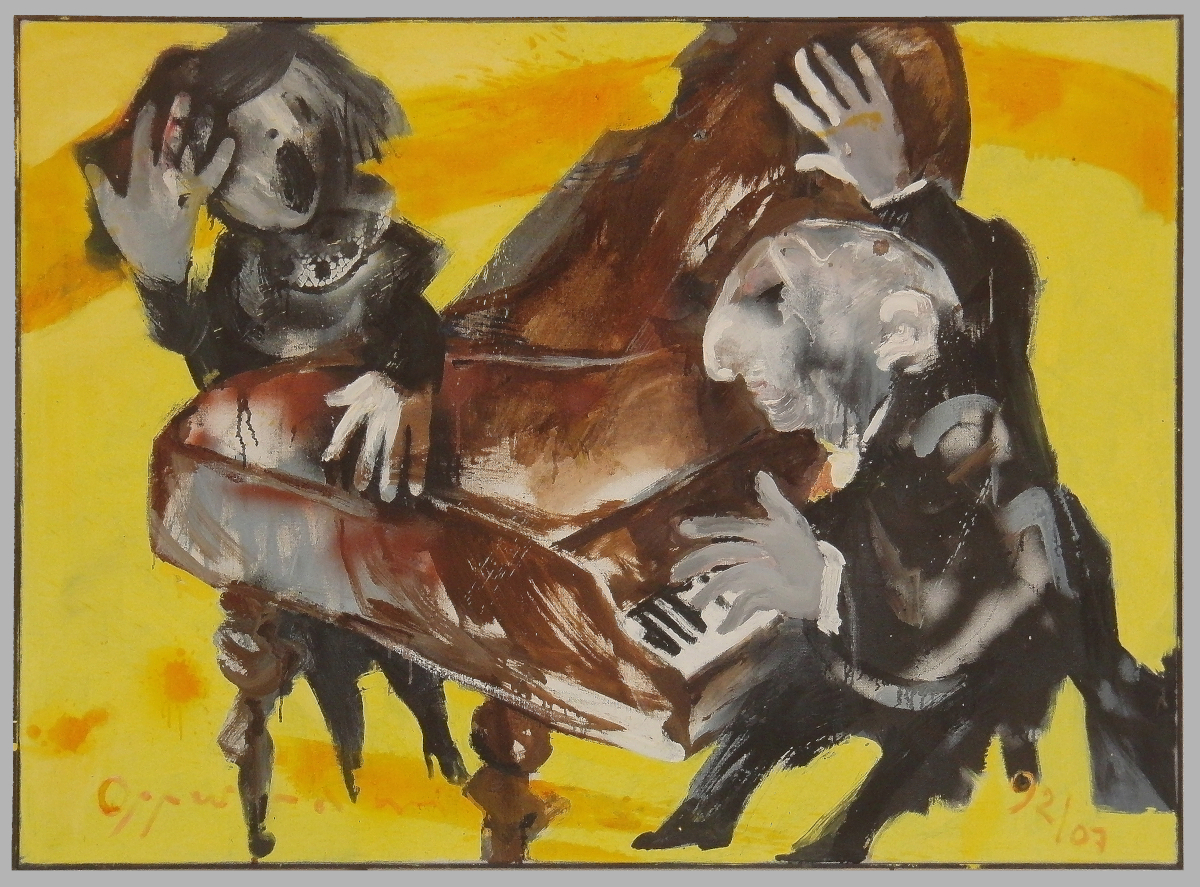
"Hausmusik I (1992/2007)" painting by Karl Oppermann

Karl Oppermann (* October 30, 1930, in Wernigerode; † August 12, 2022, in Nordharz) was a German painter.

== Life and work ==
Oppermann was born into a long-established family of craftsmen during the Weimar Republic and grew up in Wernigerode. His father was an engineer and master electrician, his grandfather a master cooper. At the end of the World War II, Oppermann decided on painting as his career choice at the age of fifteen and began writing at the same time.

After graduating from the Städtisches Fürst-Otto-Gymnasium, now the Gerhart-Hauptmann-Gymnasium Wernigerode, Oppermann left the GDR out of political conviction and studied at the Hochschule für bildende Künste in West Berlin from 1950. Oppermann initially devoted himself to art education with Ludwig Gabriel Schrieber (sculpture) and Curt Lahs (painting) and then switched to free painting as a master student of Ernst Schumacher. In 1952, during a trip to Paris, he met Günter Grass, the later Nobel Prize for Literature winner, with whom he had been friends since their years of study together at the Berlin Academy of Fine Arts.

In the 1960s Oppermann became known through his first exhibitions in Berlin. In his art, he strove to convey a "humane mission". In this sense, he felt committed to the Central German painting tradition. The period around 1960 also saw the beginning of his friendship with the Polish literary and theater critic Andrzej Wirth. Oppermann was also a member of the "Berliner Neue Gruppe" and published his first volume of literary poetry with etchings "Altea" in 1962. He spent working stays in Spain, in the Villa Romana in Florence and from 1967 onwards on the island of Elba. From 1970 to 1985, Oppermann ran a studio on Elba. On the occasion of a first Latin America trip with exhibitions in Bogotá and Caracas, a newspaper review by Luis Freres referred to Oppermann as a "Prusiano-Latino" for the first time. The term can be traced back to Oppermann's in-depth examination of the Prussian past, which resulted from his claim to political-historical enlightenment, as well as to his emotional attachment to Spain (German: "engagierter Preuße und Lateinamerikaner"). Numerous solo exhibitions subsequently took Oppermann to Caracas, Lima, New York City, São Paulo, and many European capitals such as Berlin, Brussels, Paris, London and Prague.

In 1971 he was appointed professor at his alma mater, today's Universität der Künste (UdK), where he was appointed professor. Oppermann taught painting here for 25 years. He worked for many years in university politics, was Senator of the UdK, represented colleges and universities on the Broadcasting Council. From 1989 until his death, Oppermann ran a studio on Rambla de las Flores in Barcelona alongside his workshop in Berlin. Today, his works can be found in many museums, such as the Jewish Museum in Berlin, Kupferstichkabinett Berlin, Landesmuseum Bonn, Kupferstichkabinett Dresden, Biblioteca Nacional de Madrid, Stiftung Stadtmuseum Berlin as well as in public institutions and banks. In 1995, Gebrüder Mann Verlag, Berlin, published a comprehensive biography of the painter under the title "Karl Oppermann – Prusiano-Latino".

In 1996 he moved the center of his life from Berlin to Veckenstedt in the Harzvorland. From 2007 to 2019, Oppermann was chairman of the association Kinder-Atelier Harz e. V., which he initiated and is based in Wernigerode. After numerous smaller poetry publications, he published his first volume of memoirs in 2005 under the title Klatschmohn und Silberstift. The follow-up volume Wechselgesang appeared in 2007 and Nachschlag in 2010. In September 2010, Oppermann donated his entire oeuvre of prints to the Wernigerode Cultural Foundation.

== "Karl Oppermann Foundation" ==
Together with the Harz University of Applied Studies, Oppermann established the "Karl Oppermann Foundation" in 2008, a collection of large-format oil paintings. This is unique for the universities of applied sciences in the state of Saxony-Anhalt. Oppermann contributed paintings with international themes, which are now accessible to the general public as a donation or permanent loan in the Wernigerode University Library. In 2009, the artist added a portrait of Alexander von Humboldt and a large-format triptych to the foundation. The paintings deal with self-awareness, departure and the search for happiness, but also with flight, expulsion and the struggle for survival.

== Honors ==
In 2003 Oppermann was awarded the Wernigerode Art Prize. In 2009 he was honored with the Andreas Art Prize (German: Andreas-Kunstpreis) of Sankt Andreasberg town. In 2015, Karl Oppermann received the Badge of Honor of the State of Saxony-Anhalt. In 2021, he was awarded the Federal Cross of Merit on Ribbon.

== Private matters ==
Oppermann died in August 2022 in the Veckenstedt district of the municipality of Nordharz in Saxony-Anhalt at the age of 91. He was married twice and is survived by three children.

== Solo exhibitions (selection) ==
- 1959 Galerie Gerd Rosen, Berlin
- 1963 Galerie Gerda Bassenge, Berlin
- 1965 Haus am Lützowplatz, Berlin
- 1968 Museum Schloss Oberhausen
- 1969 Gallery U Recickych, Prague
- 1970 Seat of the Federal President, Bonn
- 1971/73/75 Gallery Gerda Bassenge, Berlin
- 1975 Great Orangery of Charlottenburg Palace
- 1977 Galleria d'Arte, Genoa
- 1980 Museo d'Arte, Lima
- 1987 Museo de Arte de São Paulo
- 1988 Shea & Beker Gallery, New York
- 1991/92/93 Galerie Ludwig Lange, Berlin
- 1993 Sala d'Arcs, Barcelona
- 1994/2003 Annual: Enno Becker Gallery, Berlin
- 1995/2000/03 Kunstverein Wernigerode
- 1995/2007 Burg Kniphausen, Wilhelmshaven
- 2002 Kunstverein Talstraße, Halle (Saale)
- 2005 Berlin University of the Arts
- 2007/09 Bauscher Gallery, Potsdam
- 2008 Representation of the State of Saxony-Anhalt, Brussels
- 2010 Berlin University of the Arts
- 2012 Gallery at the Grand Elysée, Hamburg
- 2012 Municipal Art Gallery, Plovdiv/Bulgaria

Permanent presence:

- Bauscher Gallery (Potsdam/Babelsberg)
- Harz University/Library

== Works (selection) ==
- "Large Berlin Picture", 1965
- "Berliner Weiße", 1966
- "Our ride went to Ostlang", 1967
- "Picnic at the Voterraio", 1968
- "Rambla de las Flores", 1982
- "Christ the Juggler", 1983
- "German Dream", 1984
- "The Birthday Cake", 1984
- "Fisherman and Swimmer", 1985
- "Treptower Park", 1985
- "Self-Portrait with Tie", 1986
- "The Beginners", 1987
- "Large Paseo", 1992
- "Hausgemeinschaftsleitung", 1994
- "West-östlicher Diwan", 1994
- "Berlin auf Achse", 1999
- "Tenerife Transfer", 2006

== Book publications ==
- "Altea", poems and etchings, Eigen-V., Berlin 1962
- "Butterflies", poems and etchings, Berlin 1969
- "Unter der Lasur", poems and drawings, Edition Galerie am Abend, Berlin 1971
- "An die Mauer geschrieben", poems and silkscreens, Eigen-V., Berlin 1974
- "Metamorphosen", watercolors and poems, Edition Ars VIVA!, Berlin 1980
- "Kopfstand und Bandoneon", poems and watercolors, Berlin 1982
- "Les Vagants", oil paintings and drawings, Genoa/Berlin 1984
- "Vagants", poems and drawings, Torhaus-Galerie, Braunschweig 1985
- "Dear Hans", D. von Kurmin Verlag, Berlin 1990
- "Musikalisches Skizzenbuch", Oberbaum-Verlag, Berlin 1993
- "Klatschmohn und Silberstift", Letterado Verlag, Quedlinburg 2005, ISBN 3-938579-09-9
- "Wechselgesang", Ziethen Verlag, Oschersleben 2007, ISBN 978-3-938380-64-2
- "Nachschlag", Ziethen Verlag, Oschersleben 2010, ISBN 978-3-932090-20-2

== Literature ==
- Helmut Börsch-Supan: "Künstler der Gegenwart", Berlin 1975
- Andrezej Wirth: "Les Vagants", Genoa 1983
- Ernst A. Busche: "Berlin Bilder 1963–1986", Nicolai, Berlin 1986
- Ernst A. Busche: "Jäger und Gejagte", Berlin 1989
- Kerstin Englert: "Karl Oppermann – Prusiano Latino", Gebr. Mann Verlag Berlin 1995, ISBN 3-7861-1792-6 (Biography)
- Wibke von Bonin: Catalog Burg Kniphausen, Wilhelmshaven 1995
- Christian Juranek: "Simplicissimus und Courage", Renchen 2004
- Harz University of Applied Sciences: "El mundo – un teatro, The Karl Oppermann Foundation at the Harz University of Applied Sciences (FH)", Halberstadt 2009
- Kai Schlüter (ed.): Günter Grass: Das Milch-Märchen. Early advertising works. With a DVD by Radio Bremen. Berlin: Ch. Links Verlag 2013, ISBN 978-3-86153-739-7
