= Esther Berlin-Joel =

Israeli painter and graphic designer

Esther Berlin-Joel אסתר ברלין-יואל
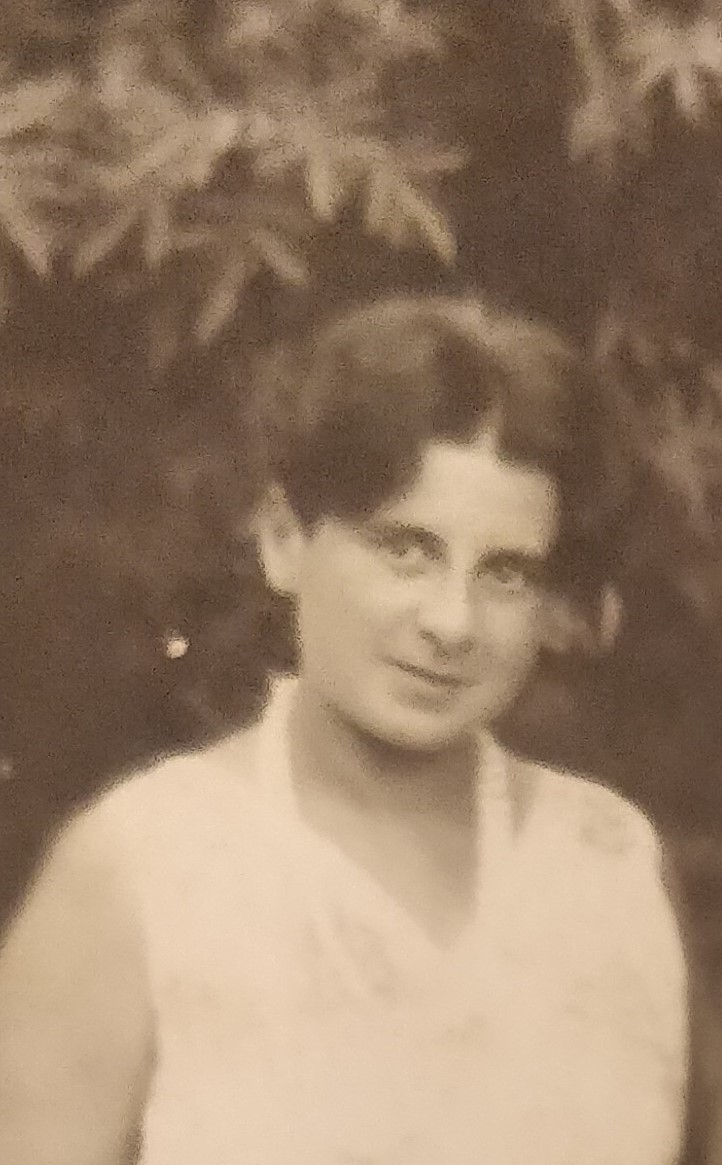
- Esther Berlו Joel, Israeli painter and poster artist
- Born: May 2, 1895; Hamburg, Germany
- Died: March 7, 1972 (aged 76); Haifa, Israel
- Education: Alexander Archipenko, Ludwig Meidner
- Known for: Painting, graphic design

Esther Berlin-Joel (also known as Esther Berli-Joel, Esther Barli-Joel, Hebrew: אסתר ברלין-יואל; May 2, 1895 – March 7, 1972) was a German-born Israeli painter and graphic designer. She designed the coats of arms for the Israeli cities of Haifa and Holon.

== Biography ==
Esther Else Joel was born on March 2, 1895, in Hamburg, Germany. Joel was greatly interested in the arts and between 1915 and 1920 she went to study at the University of Fine Arts of Hamburg. After completion of her studies she moved to Berlin in 1920. While in Berlin she studied arts with Alexander Archipenko and Ludwig Meidner at the Berlin University of the Arts. Berlin-Joel had her first personal exhibition in 1925, in Hamburg.

In 1922 Esther married Dr. Haim Berlin, and their son Dan was born in 1923. At the end of 1925, the family immigrated to Mandatory Palestine and settled in Tel Aviv. In 1930, Haim Berlin and Esther divorced, and she continued to publish under the name E. Berlin-Joel. Following the movement for Hebraization of surnames, Esther changed her last name to Berli-Joel.

Berli-Joel was a prolific graphic designer and artist, she had many exhibitions, including 12 solo exhibitions. She designed many posters, coat of arms and emblems. Berli-Joel also published several books showing her collective works.

In 1936, she received first prize for her book of paintings about Haifa.

Esther Berlin-Joel died on March 7, 1972, and is buried in Haifa, Israel.

== Coats of arms ==
Berlin-Joel designed the coats of arms of many organizations. She was also approached to design the coat of arms for Holon and Haifa and suggested options for the Jerusalem coat of arms.

The city of Holon, Israel, coat of Arms designed by E. Berlin Joel

=== Haifa coat of arms ===
The city of Haifa coat of arms

In early 1934, Hassan Bey Shukri, mayor of Haifa, started the process of selecting a coat of arms for the city. In July 1935, an external committee decided on a competition with a prize of 15 Palestine pounds. By 1936, the committee, comprising with additional judges including an artist, architect and an engineer, couldn't find a winner, but was impressed with the designs suggested by Esther Berlin-Joel. The committee decided to ask Berlin-Joel to finish the design, with specific guidelines provided. Berlin-Joel designed several swatches, combining Mount Carmel and the sea. On April 22, 1936, the committee convened for the final time to select the design and approve. The Haifa coat of arms was approved by June 1936.

==== Jerusalem coat of arms ====
In 1943, Berli-Joel approached Mustafa al-Khalidi, mayor of Jerusalem and provided several suggestions for the City of Jerusalem's coat of arms. The city hall adopted one of Berli-Joel's suggestions on May 20, 1943, but required the approval of the College of Arms. Due to the conditions during World War II, this approval was delayed. Following the death of al-Khalidi in 1944, and disagreements within city fractions for a rotation of Arab-Jewish mayors, the British High Commissioner disbanded the council and appointed an all-British council starting on July 11, 1945. The discussion on the coat of arms was archived.

== Publications ==
- 8 chalk drawings (1938) ("דמויות" in Hebrew:characters)
- Collection of works: Folk in Israel (1955)
- Collection of works: Children in Israel

=== Posters ===
Posters designed by E. Berlin Joel:

- Palestine Maritime Lloyd Ltd. Haifa, Lithography, (1930)
- Everybody To the Fair, advertising the Levant Fair, Woodcut (1932)
- Every Penny for Every grain of earth (כל פרוטה שעל אדמה) at the National Library of Israel
- we buy only local products E. Berlin Joel, at the National Library of Israel
- Defense - Production - Absorption, (הגנה, יצירה, קליטה) for the Mapai party, Lithography, 1935
- The Manufacturers Association, Lithography, 1935
- Zion - Would You Ask After the Well-Being of Thy Immigrants? (1938) woodcut
- The Association of Working Mothers, woodcut, (1949)
- Fair for The Association of Working Mothers, Lithography, (1959)
- Pidyon Shvuyim, woodcut, 1939
- Social work, woodcut, 1940

== Selected exhibitions ==
Solo exhibitions

- Solo Exhibition, Hamburg (1925)
- E. Berlin-Joel and Melita Schiffer, Haifa (1941)

Group exhibitions

Among the group exhibitions Berli-Joel participated in:

- Israeli contemporary artists (1951) Tel Aviv Museum of Art
- General exhibition of Israeli artists (1954) Tel Aviv Museum of Art
- Israeli contemporary artists (1955), Tel Aviv
- General exhibition of Israeli Artist celebrating 50 years since the foundation of Tel Aviv, Tel Aviv Museum of Art
- General exhibition of Israeli artists (1960) Tel Aviv Museum of Art
- General exhibition of Israeli artists (1961) Tel Aviv Museum of Art
- General exhibition of Israeli artists (1963) Tel Aviv Museum of Art
- Art Exhibition (1963), the Marc Chagall Artists center, Haifa
- General exhibition of Israeli artists (1965) Tel Aviv Museum of Art
- Israeli Artists for Defence, (1967) The Helena Rubinstein Pavilion, Tel Aviv Museum of Art
- 1976, Haifa Museum of Art
