= Una H. Moehrke =

German visual artist (born 1953)

- Born: July 7, 1953 (age 73); Hannover, Germany
- Known for: Fine Art, Performance Art, Text Art, Art professor
- Website: www.una-moehrke.de

Una Helga Moehrke (born July 7, 1953 in Hanover) is a German visual artist specializing in painting, drawing, performance art and experimental text. She was a Professor for Art and Art Mediation at Burg Giebichenstein University of Art and Design in Halle from 1994 to 2018.

== Life ==
Una H. Moehrke studied Painting at the Berlin University of the Arts (graduated in 1980 as a Master Student of Raimund Girke), along with Art History, Religious History, and Philosophy at the Free University of Berlin. She has received stipends from the Berlin Senate, the State of Lower Saxony, and the German Academic Exchange Service and prizes from the Ilse Augustin Foundation, Berlin, the Federal Garden Exhibition in Berlin, and the Baer Art Center, Iceland. After lectureships and guest professorships in Berlin, Lüneburg, Kiel, Braunschweig, and Dresden, she was appointed a Professor at the Burg Giebichenstein University of Art and Design in Halle in 1994. There she taught until 2018 in the Faculty of Art and was a Professor for Art and Art Mediation Art Education. Ulf Aminde, Irmela Gertsen, Georg Lisek, Julian Plodek, Luise von Rohden, Juliane Schickedanz, Jochen Schneider, Ella Ziegler and others were taught by Moehrke. Along with her teaching, Moehrke pursued her own painting and drawing. Moehrke is a member of the International Artists Bureau and an associate member of the German Artists Association. She lives in Berlin.

== Teaching ==
As an instructor, Moehrke combined in an experimental and multi-media manner societally related art mediation with artistic interventions in museums, galleries, theaters, and the world of work. Her teaching is based on the experience that artistic work is carried out in dialog with biographical and art-reflecting processes. In the framework of symposiums and catalog publications, she has realized research projects involving multiple steps.

In the 2008 project Geometry of Work, she presented artistic research and reflection processes on the heterogeneity of the current concept of work and its various manifestations, as well as documenting artistic transfer projects in concrete work milieus. A symposium in the Gallery for Contemporary Art (GfZK) in Leipzig discussed the geometry of work from its sociological, art-theoretical, and economic perspectives.

At the center of another art-theoretical research project, Im Modus der Gabe (In the Mode of the Gift), 2011, stand models from theater, visual art, and performance, in which processes of exchange, transfer, and reciprocity are effective. Considering the performative development of contemporary art, the contributions examine the degree to which concepts of the gift that develop from ethnological, philosophical, and sociological perspectives (Marcel Mauss, Maurice Godelier, Jacques Derrida, Bruno Latour, Paul Ricœur, etc.) prove viable for reflecting on the self-understanding of contemporary artistic practice in the field of tension between social effectiveness and the claim to autonomy.

The exhibition and event series erreger- | EIGEN frequenz (agent or pathogen – eigenfrequency), 2018, on the perception, mediation, and visibility of giving, taking, and passing on, is Moehrke's last presentation in the context of her teaching. In interplay with the works of the Professor, twenty-seven different positions on the phenomenon of giving and the principle of impulse and resonance were presented in the Burg Gallery Halle.

== Oeuvre ==
Starting with the photographic and performative Self-Portrait on the Surface of the Water (1980s), the Moehrke continued to develop self-portraits as abstract heads in oil painting (end of the 1990s). From the original head and mirror image Icon, she extrapolated abstract surfaces that present themselves as mostly monochromatic pictures. Moehrke works with the reduction of line and color fields. In painting, the dematerialization of color produces shifting color fields that offer reflection surfaces for light and shadow like a mirror and that change with the changing position of the viewer. These are pictures that oscillate between appearance and disappearance. The viewer perceives them as the trace of a motion. With extremely reduced coloration, they open up spaces whose atmosphere is reminiscent of phenomena of light. The viewer can associate motion within the picture with the physical motion outside of the picture (PictureSpaceMotion, 2010). Her pictures painted since 2012 with metal pigments that seem white are her primary works, a further extended reduction of monochromy.

Beginning with the performative water drawings of the 1990s, Moehrke designed a large-format, experimental form of drawing that can be categorized as site-specific art and that stands in dialog with nature and architectonic environments, for example industrial architecture, sacred buildings, or park facilities. Moehrke says drawings can grasp something ungraspable. In them, the lines condense to emblems and, in some work complexes, refer to examples from art history. Thus, in Venice in 2015, the drawings were fragmentarily transposed from historical paintings into a free and contemporary language of lines. With small, linear interventions, tradition is transferred to contemporaneity (Personal Structures. Crossing Borders: These lines are dedicated to... Palazzo Bembo, 56th International Art Exhibition, la Biennale di Venezia, Venice 2015). Moehrke's art develops dialogically in the media of performance, photography, painting, drawing, and text.

Many of Una H. Moehrke's works are publicly owned by Bear Art Center Island, the Berlinische Galerie, the Lüneburg District Government, the Franckesche Foundations Halle, Gruner + Jahr Berlin, the Wörnitz-Dessau Art Foundation, the Art Museum Moritzburg Halle (Saale), the State of Berlin, the Märkisches Museum (Berlin), the New Berlin Art Association, the Lower Saxony Artists Association, the Federal Republic of Germany Collection, the Halle Municipal Utilities, the Karlsruhe Municipal Gallery, the Wolfsburg Municipal Gallery, the Mannheim Savings Banks Insurances, and the Hanover Sprengel Museum.

== Exhibitions (selection) ==
- 2018 Erreger-I EIGENfrequenz, Exhibition and mediation project, Burg Galerie Halle, Halle/Saale, Germany
- 2017 Text statt Bild, Alvar Aalto Kulturhaus, Wolfsburg, Germany
- 2016 Images, Galerie Drei Ringe, Leipzig, Germany
- 2015 Personal Structures. Crossing Borders, Palazzo Bembo, Venice Biennale, Italy
- 2015 Die Geste der Zeichnung, Una H. Moehrke, City Gallery Lauenburg, Germany
- 2014 Line of Grace, Moritzburg Foundation, Saxony-Anhalt State Museum, Halle/Saale, Germany
- 2013 Whiteness, Gallery Inga Kondeyne, Berlin, Germany
- 2012 Una H. Moehrke, Lines & Beams, painting and drawing. Gallery enpassant, Berlin
- 2011 Una H. Moehrke, Gallery Inga Kondeyne, Berlin
- 2008 Bleistift, Buntstift & so weiter, drawings Una H. Moehrke (Touring exhibition and catalogue: Museum Abtei Liesborn of the District of Warendorf; Raum Hellrot; Städtische Galerie Wolfsburg).
- 2005 Una H. Moehrke, erscheinen und verschwinden, Painting 2001–2005, Stiftung Stadtmuseum, Berlin (Touring exhibition and catalogue: Märkisches Museum at Köllnischen Park Berlin; Kunstverein Leipzig, 2006)
- 2001 Una H. Moehrke, Flächenselbst, interfacial self, Oil paintings and drawings 1998–2001, Kunstverein Unna e.V., Unna, Germany (Touring exhibition and catalogue: Kunstverein Unna e.V.; Kunsthof e.V. Halberstadt; Fassbender Gallery, Chicago, Illinois)
- 2001 Una H. Moehrke, Präsenz - Repräsentanz, Photo installation, Kunstforum Halberstadt, Halberstadt 2001 (Exhibition catalogue: Das Gleimhaus, Halberstadt 2001)
- 1992 Una H. Moehrke. Bilder 1983–1992, Künstlerhaus Lauenburg (Touring exhibition and catalogue: Künstlerhaus Lauenburg; Stadtgalerie im Sophienhof Kiel; Galerie am Friedrichsplatz Mannheim)
- 1991 Herzsprung, Circulo de Bellas Artes, Madrid, Spain; Standortverwaltung, Lüneburg, Germany (Catalog: Exhibition on the occasion of the 10th anniversary of the Künstlerstätte Schloss Bleckede, Germany)
- 1987 Narziss oder die Kunst-Liebe – Helga Moehrke, Photo works 1980–1987, Neuer Berliner Kunstverein Berlin (Touring exhibition and catalogue: Neuer Berliner Kunstverein; Kunsthalle Recklinghausen; Mannheimer Kunstverein, Germany)
- 1987 Totentanz, Performance on 22 November 1987 in St. Petri zu Lübeck, Overbeck Society, Lübeck, Germany
- 1986 Love is everey thing that answers a question, Art Gallery at Harbourfront, Toronto, Canada
- 1986 Crier le hasard, Parc des Buttes-Chaumont, Goethe-Institut Paris and Mercedes-Benz, Paris, France
- 1984 Kein Blatt wie das andere, Performance, Herrenhäuser Gärten, Hannover. Exhibition Sprengel Museum, Hanover, Germany

== Bibliography (selection) ==
=== Publications on teaching ===
- erreger-| EIGEN frequenz, Catalogue of the exhibition and mediation project, Burg Galerie Halle, ed. by Burg Giebichenstein University of Art and Design Halle, Halle/Saale 2018.
- Burg Giebichenstein Kunsthochschule Halle; Reuter, Jule (eds.): Burg 100 – Professoren und Professorinnen der Burg aus Kunst und Design. Burg Giebichenstein: Halle 2015, ISBN 978-3-86019-100-2.
- Hentschel, Ingrid; Moehrke, Una H.; Hoffmann, Klaus (eds.): Im Modus der Gabe. Theater, Kunst, Performance in der Gegenwart. Bielefeld: Kerber Verlag 2011, ISBN 978-3-86678-494-9.
- Drebber, Madalena; Moehrke, Una H.; Penzel, Joachim (eds): Geometrie der Arbeit. Transfer von Kunst in gesellschaftliche Funktionsbereiche. Bielefeld: Kerber Verlag 2008, ISBN 978-3-86678-182-5.

=== Monographs ===
- Una H. Moehrke, Bild_Text R A U M. Malerei-Zeichnung, Performance-Text, 1984–2018, ed. by Burg Giebichenstein University of Art and Design Halle, Halle/Saale 2018, ISBN 9783860191439.
- Personal Structures. Crossing Borders. Cat. ed. by Global Art Affairs Foundation, Venice 2015, ISBN 9789490784188.
- Camelia Flowers (Cat.), Camelia Hills Jeju, Korea 2012
- PANTA RHEI. Der Fluß und seine Bilder. Ed. by Ute Seiderer, Leipzig: Reclam-Verlag, 2009.
- Weiß sehen. Bleistift, Buntstift & so weiter. Painting, drawing, ed. by Museum Abtei Liesborn and Raum Hellrot, Halle 2008, ISBN 9783941100367.
- Es ist das Andere. Una H. Moehrke, Malerei 2007, ed. by Anhaltischer Kunstverein Dessau e.V. and BIK Gallery 149, Bremerhaven 2007, ISBN 9783000237959.
- Positions-Directions. (Cat.), Stadtgalerie im Elbeforum, Brunsbüttel 2005
- Erscheinen und Verschwinden. Una H. Moehrke Malerei 2001–2005, ed. by Stiftung Stadtmuseum, Berlin 2005, ISBN 9783000169373.
- Larass, Petra; Drück, Patricia: Die Quelle als Inspiration. Historisches Wissen in der zeitgenössischen Kunst, ed. by Franckesche Stiftungen, Halle/Saale 2002, ISBN 978-3931479305.
- Flächenselbst, Ölbilder und Zeichnungen. Interfacial Self, Oil paintings and drawings (Cat.), Kunstverein Unna & Kunsthof e. V., Halberstadt, and Fassbender Gallery, Chicago, 2001, ISBN 9783000074547.
- Mehrmirmär, Zeichnungen und Bilder, Gallery Kasten, Mannheim, and Galerie von Tempelhoff, Karlsruhe 1999.
- Una, Bilder 1992–1994, Künstlerhaus Göttingen, 1994.
- Oberflächenferne, Museum für Photographie, Braunschweig 1988.
- Oberwasser, Unterwasser oder das Aufgehobensein im Wasser, Kunstverein Lüneburg, Schiffshebewerk, Scharnebeck 1987.
- Narziß oder die Kunstliebe, Neue Berliner Kunstverein (NBK), Berlin 1986.
- Kein Blatt wie das andere, Sprengel Museum, Hannover 1984.
