= Fons Hickmann =

German graphic designer

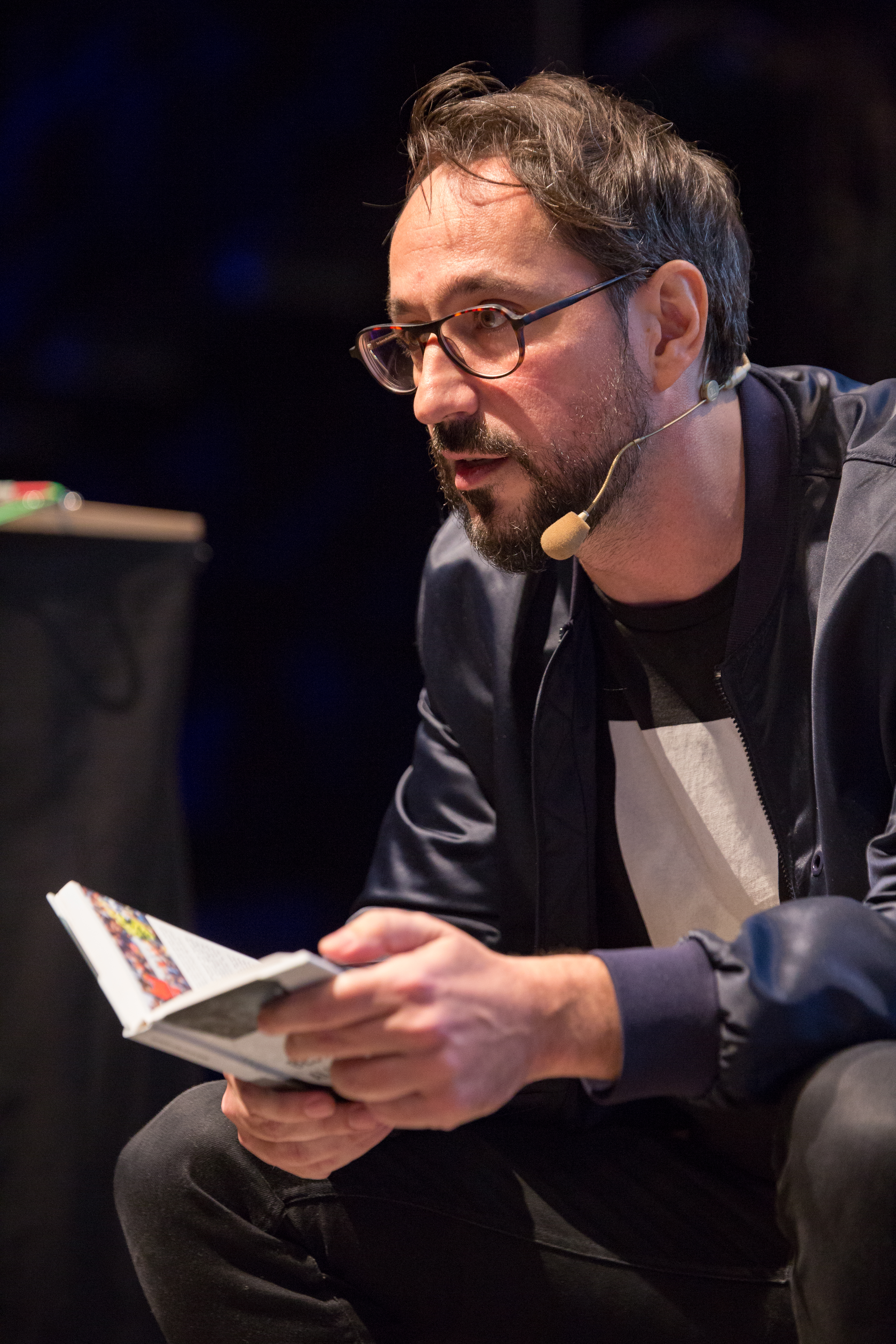
- Fons Hickmann is reading out his book The Best Game Ever at the See-Conference (2016)
- Born: Fons Matthias Hickmann; 1966 (age 59–60); Hamm, Germany
- Occupations: Graphic designer; Professor of Communication Design

Fons Hickmann (born 1966) is a German graphic designer and professor of Communication Design at the Berlin University of the Arts. He is the founder and director of the design studio Fons Hickmann m23.

== Life and career ==
Hickmann was born in the German city of Hamm and studied photography and communication design combined with philosophy at the University of Applied Sciences Düsseldorf, and aesthetics and media theory in Wuppertal. In 2001 Hickmann and Gesine Grotrian-Steinweg founded the design studio Fons Hickmann m23 in Berlin. Hickmann serves as its director. The emphasis of the studio's work is on the development of complex communication systems and corporate design as well as book, poster, magazine and web design. The studio has received numerous international awards, and its works have been represented at every international design biennial.

Hickmann was a professor at the University of Applied Arts Vienna from 2001 to 2007, before taking over the professorship in Graphic Design in the Berlin University of the Arts Faculty of Design in 2007. Previously, he had taught at the Universities of Essen and Dortmund, and gave lectures and seminars in, among other places, London, Ljubliana, Istanbul, Beijing and Shanghai. He is an appointed member of the Type Directors Club of New York and the Art Directors Club Germany, as well as of the Alliance Graphique Internationale.

Hickmann and his colleagues promoted the initiative "11 Designers for Germany" which tried to bring a consciousness of graphic design into the public sphere. The group received wide media attention for their effort to prevent the adoption of an embarrassing logo for the 2006 FIFA World Cup in Germany.

Hickmann and his studio were invited to exhibit at the opening of Museum of the Image (MOTI) in the Netherlands, the world's first graphic design museum. The exhibition, European Championship of Graphic Design was opened by Queen Beatrix in June 2008.

From 2012 to 2014 he was a member of the expert jury of the "Design Award of the Federal Republic of Germany". Since 2018 he is president of the professional association 100 Beste Plakate (100 Best Posters).

== Publications ==
Hickmann's publications include:

- The Neubad Plakat - A Contemporary Design Phenomenon. Erich Brechbühl, Fons Hickmann, Lea Hinrichs, Sam Steiner, Sven Lindhorst-Emme (Hrsg.) slanted publisher 2023 ISBN 978-3-948440-49-7
- Morgen und davor – 100 Arbeiten aus 10 Jahren Klasse Hickmann. Pascal Kress, Fons Hickmann (Hrsg.) Verlag Hermann Schmidt 2017, ISBN 978-3-87439-888-6
- Das beste Spiel aller Zeiten! (2014) (with Markus Büsges and Oliver Gehrs). Kein & Aber. ISBN 9783036957005
- Von erfolgreichen Designern lernen (2014) (with Boris Kochan, Rolf Mehnert, Daniel Rothaug, Raban Ruddigkeit, and Jochen Theurer). Galileo Design. ISBN 978-3836225403
- Beyond Graphic Design (2007). Verlag Hermann Schmidt. ISBN 978-3-87439-741-4
- Touch Me There (2005). Die Gestalten Verlag. ISBN 3-89955-079-X
- Fons Hickmann & Students (2004). China Youth Press. ISBN 7-5006-5665-3
- Displace yourself! (2002). University of Applied Arts Vienna (published in conjunction with his retrospective exhibition in Vienna)

== Selected awards ==
Hickmann's design projects and posters have received numerous international design distinctions and accolades:

- **2024:** Grand Prix / Gold Award, Taiwan International Graphic Design Award (TIGDA)
- **2022:** Certificate of Typographic Excellence, Type Directors Club (TDC New York)
- **2020:** Red Dot Design Award (Best of the Best), Essen, Germany, for communication design and poster systems
- **2015:** Gold Award, European Design Awards (ED-Awards)
- **2012:** Silver Award, Art Directors Club (ADC Germany)
