= Harz University of Applied Sciences =

University in Saxony-Anhalt, Germany

Coordinates: 51.8267°N 10.7602°E

- Hochschule Harz
- Established: 1991
- Rector: Folker Roland
- Students: 3,269 (2020)
- Location: Wernigerode and Halberstadt, Saxony-Anhalt, Germany
- Website: hs-harz.de

The Harz University of Applied Sciences (German: Hochschule Harz) is a public university located in the Harz District of Saxony-Anhalt, Germany. It maintains two campuses: one in Wernigerode and another in Halberstadt. The Wernigerode campus houses the Department of Automation and Computer Sciences and the Department of Business Studies, while the Halberstadt campus is home to the Department of Public Management.

The university focuses on practice-oriented education and regional collaboration, offering undergraduate and graduate programs across its three academic departments.

== History ==
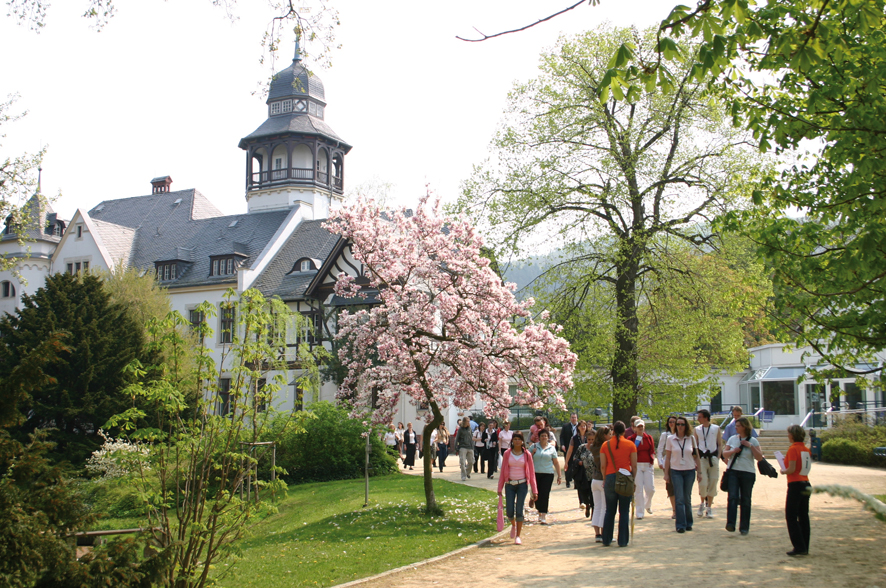
The rector’s office – a 100-year-old villa on the Wernigerode campus

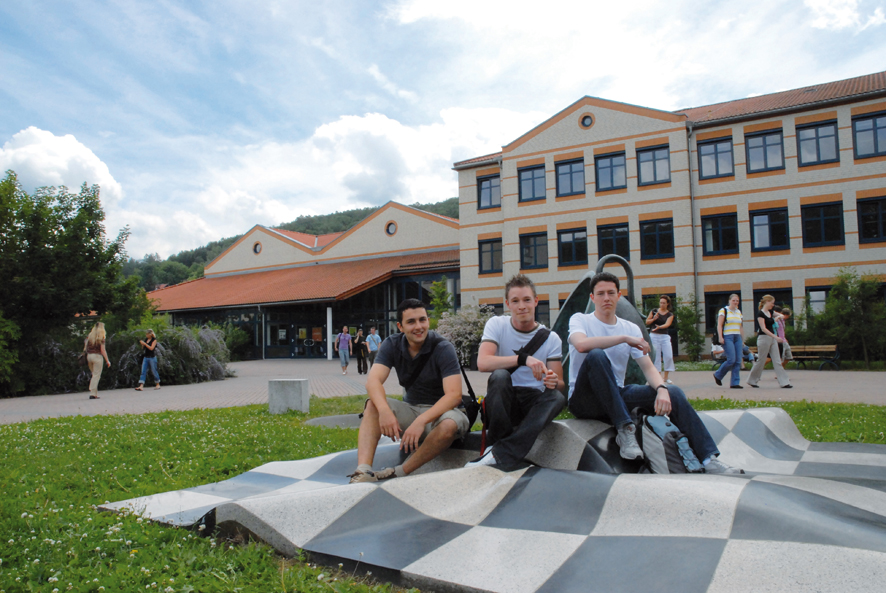
Department of Business Studies

The Harz University of Applied Sciences (German: Hochschule Harz) was founded in October 1991 as Fachhochschule Harz. Initially, its academic offerings focused on the Department of Business Studies in Wernigerode, with programs in Business Administration, Tourism, and Business Informatics. During the 1991–1992 winter semester, 77 students enrolled. By the 2007–2008 winter semester, the department expanded to six Bachelor's degree programs and introduced two Master's degree programs: Business Consulting and Tourism and Destination Development.

In autumn 1992, the Department of Automation and Computer Sciences launched its first programs in Electrical Engineering and Computer Science, enrolling 28 students during the 1992–1993 winter semester. As of 2023, the department hosts approximately 800 students across eight degree programs, including the later-added Master's degree in Computer Science (Mobile Systems).

The Department of Public Management, located in Halberstadt, was established later. During the 1998–1999 winter semester, it introduced undergraduate programs in Public Administration and Administrative Economics (Public Service Management). Over time, the department expanded its offerings to include European Administrative Management, Administrative Management (eGovernment), and a Master's degree in Public Management.

On 27 January 1998, the institution was renamed Harz University of Applied Sciences (Hochschule Harz). Its academic portfolio continued to grow, and in 2003, it received the Best Practice Hochschule 2003 award from the Centre for Higher Education (Zentrum für Hochschulentwicklung). By 2020, enrollment reached 3,269 students.

The university’s historic rector’s office, a 100-year-old villa, remains a landmark on the Wernigerode campus.

== Wernigerode campus ==
The Wernigerode campus serves as the headquarters of the Harz University of Applied Sciences. It spans 6.2-hectare (15-acre) in the Hasserode district and hosts the Department of Automation and Computer Sciences and the Department of Business Studies.

=== Campus facilities ===
The campus combines administrative and academic buildings, including a modern structure built on the site of a former paper mill. Key facilities include:

- An electronic data processing center and a library.
- Laboratories, multimedia-equipped lecture halls, and a media center with an integrated recording studio.
- The Language Self-Learning Centre, which uses multimedia systems to support individualized language skill development.
- A main auditorium with advanced audiovisual technology and seating for over 250 attendees.

=== Student services and amenities ===
Since the 2006 summer semester, a Student Service Centre has centralized administrative support for enrollment, academic advising, and other student needs. The campus also offers:

- Campus-wide Wi-Fi coverage.
- Bundled service facilities, including a dining hall, cafeteria, and on-campus housing.
- Recreational amenities such as a beach volleyball court, open-air chess installation, fitness rooms, and a modern sports hall.
- A diverse cultural program and student-run associations.

== Halberstadt campus ==
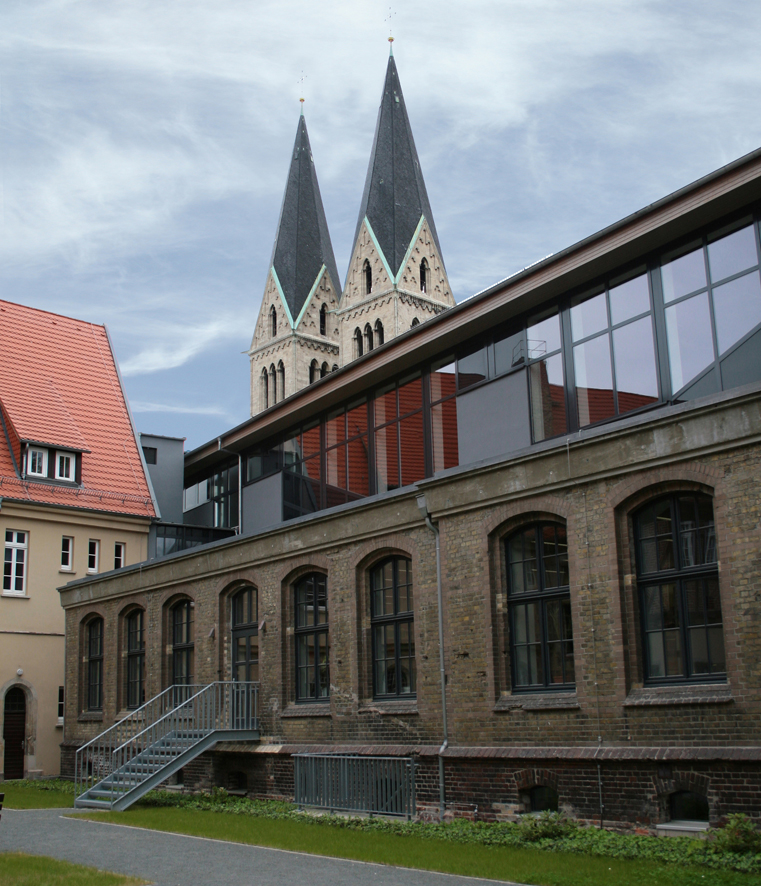
Department of Public Management

The Department of Public Management relocated to its current Halberstadt campus at Domplatz during the 2004–2005 winter semester. Situated in Halberstadt's city center, the campus integrates historic and modern architectural elements, forming three interconnected buildings.

=== Campus facilities ===
- A large lecture hall, designed in the style of the British Commons, hosts lectures and public events.
- A Language Self-Learning Centre complements regular language courses, enabling students to enhance their skills independently.
- The Domcafete, a dining hall operated by the Student Union Magdeburg, was established to serve campus occupants.

=== Design and features ===
The campus blends functionality with aesthetic appeal, emphasizing collaborative spaces and modern amenities. Its central location provides easy access to cultural and civic institutions in Halberstadt.

== International alignment ==
The Harz University of Applied Sciences has aligned its academic framework with the Bologna Process by restructuring its programs into internationally recognized Bachelor's and Master's degrees. This reform ensures standardized examinations and compatibility within the European Higher Education Area, facilitating student mobility and enhancing global career opportunities for graduates.

=== Internationalization strategy ===
The university’s global focus is reflected in:

- Mandatory language courses integrated into all degree programs.
- Internationalized curricula, including courses taught in English.
- Adoption of the European Credit Transfer System (ECTS) across all departments.

=== Global partnerships and student mobility ===
As of 2023, the university's International Office maintains 71 partnership agreements with institutions in 28 countries. Each semester:

- Over 100 students study abroad for one or more semesters.
- Approximately the same number of international students enroll as exchange or full-time students.

== Research ==
The Harz University of Applied Sciences hosts the Centre of Competence for Information and Communication Technologies, Tourism and Services, part of Saxony-Anhalt's Network of Excellence for Applied and Transfer-oriented Research (German: Kompetenznetzwerk für Angewandte und Transferorientierte Forschung, KAT). This network collaboratively links applied research initiatives across Saxony-Anhalt’s higher education institutions. In 2009, it supported 157 projects at four universities of applied sciences, with a total funding volume of €8 million.

=== Research focus areas ===
Since 2005, the Centre of Competence has established the following research focus areas:

- E-government for business organizations and legal frameworks for e-administration.
- Geographic information systems (GIS) and web-mapping services.
- Polymer fiber technology.
- Tourism for Generation 50+ (senior demographics).
- Cybersecurity, automated vehicular systems, and microcontroller applications.

=== Thematic scope and funding ===
Research projects span fields such as communication technology, mobile robotics, electronic governance, service quality in tourism value chains, and accounting systems. Third-party funding regularly constitutes 10% of the university’s annual budget, underscoring its emphasis on externally supported innovation.

== Arts, culture, and lecture series ==
The Harz University of Applied Sciences fosters strong ties to the Harz region through cultural and educational initiatives open to both students and the public. These programs emphasize intergenerational dialogue and community engagement.

=== Art exhibitions ===
The university’s Rector’s Office—a historic 100-year-old villa—and the modern Paper Mill Building on the Wernigerode campus regularly host art exhibitions. These events feature works by regional and international artists, including students, faculty, and amateur creators.

=== Karl Oppermann foundation ===
In 2008, the university established the Karl Oppermann Foundation, a rare initiative among Saxony-Anhalt's universities of applied sciences. The foundation houses four large-format oil paintings by Karl Oppermann, an internationally renowned artist and former professor at the Berlin University of the Arts. These works, addressing themes of migration, identity, and survival, are displayed in the Wernigerode campus library as a donation or permanent loan. In 2009, Oppermann expanded the collection with a portrait of Alexander von Humboldt and a triptych exploring themes of self-discovery and resilience.

=== Conference and event management ===
In 2006, the university launched a Department for Conference and Event Management to meet growing demand for its facilities as a seminar and congress venue. Notable events include the 2010 conference of the Wine Tourism and Culinary Commission in Freyburg.

=== Intergenerational education programs ===
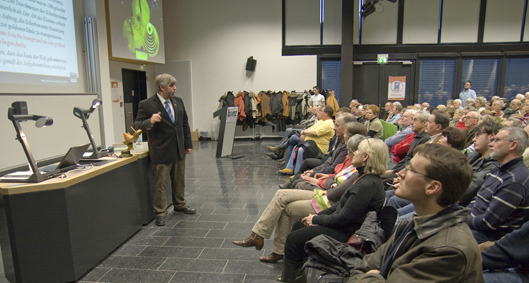
Higher education for generations

Since 2007, the GenerationenHochschule ("University for All Generations") has offered monthly public lectures on topics such as sustainability, technology, and societal trends. Over 250 attendees of all ages participate in these events, led by university faculty and industry experts. In 2009, the program introduced GenerationenHochschule aktuell, a series addressing timely and emerging issues.

=== KinderHochschule (Children's University) ===
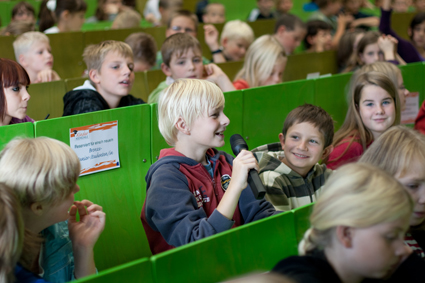
Children's university

Founded in 2006 with support from an international foundation and corporate sponsors, the KinderHochschule hosts quarterly interactive workshops for children aged 8–12. Sessions emphasize hands-on learning, and participants receive a junior student pass to track progress toward a "genius" status, rewarded with small prizes. Since 2009, the program has partnered with GEOlino, a children’s science magazine.
