= Nicolai Verlag =

The Nicolai Verlag is one of the oldest surviving book publishers in Germany. It was founded in Berlin in 1713 by Christoph Gottlieb Nicolai (died 1752) as the Nicolaische Verlagsbuchhandlung. Until the end of the 19th century, it was based in the Nicolaihaus building at 13 Brüderstraße. Initially, texts were published about religion, medicine, and jurisprudence, but also school books.

From 1965 to 1995, the publisher Dieter Beuermann owned the publishing house. In 1995, Nicolai Verlag was sold to Verlagsgruppe Georg von Holtzbrinck, at times being a subsidiary of the S. Fischer Verlag. In 2004, it was taken over by the publisher Andreas von Stedman. In February 2016, the former MTV boss Christiane zu Salm bought the publishing house.

== Bibliography ==
- Pamela E. Selwyn: Friedrich Nicolai as Bookseller and Publisher in the Age of Enlightenment 1750–1810. The Pennsylvania State University Press, University Park, Pennsylvania 2000.
- (in German) Ernst Friedel: Zur Geschichte der Nicolaischen Buchhandlung und des Hauses Brüderstraße 13 in Berlin. Nicolai, Berlin 1891.
- (in German) Ausstellungskatalog der Herzog August Bibliothek Wolfenbüttel, bearb. v. Paul Raabe: Friedrich Nicolai 1733–1811. Die Verlagswerke eines preußischen Buchhändlers der Aufklärung 1759–1811. Nicolai, Berlin 1983.
- (in German) Bernhard Fabian (ed.): Friedrich Nicolai 1733–1811. Essays zum 250. Geburtstag. Nicolai, Berlin 1983.
- (in German) Bernhard Fabian: Zur Geschichte der Nicolaischen Verlagsbuchhandlung. Olms, Hildesheim [u. a.] 2006. ISBN 3-487-11956-0
- (in German) Marlies Ebert, Uwe Hecker: Das Nicolaihaus. Brüderstraße 13 in Berlin. Nicolai, Berlin 2006. ISBN 978-3-89479-363-0
- (in German) Rainer Falk und Alexander Košenina (ed.): Friedrich Nicolai und die Berliner Aufklärung. Wehrhahn, Hannover 2008. ISBN 978-3-86525-081-0
