= Hermann Rosendorff =

Australian violinist

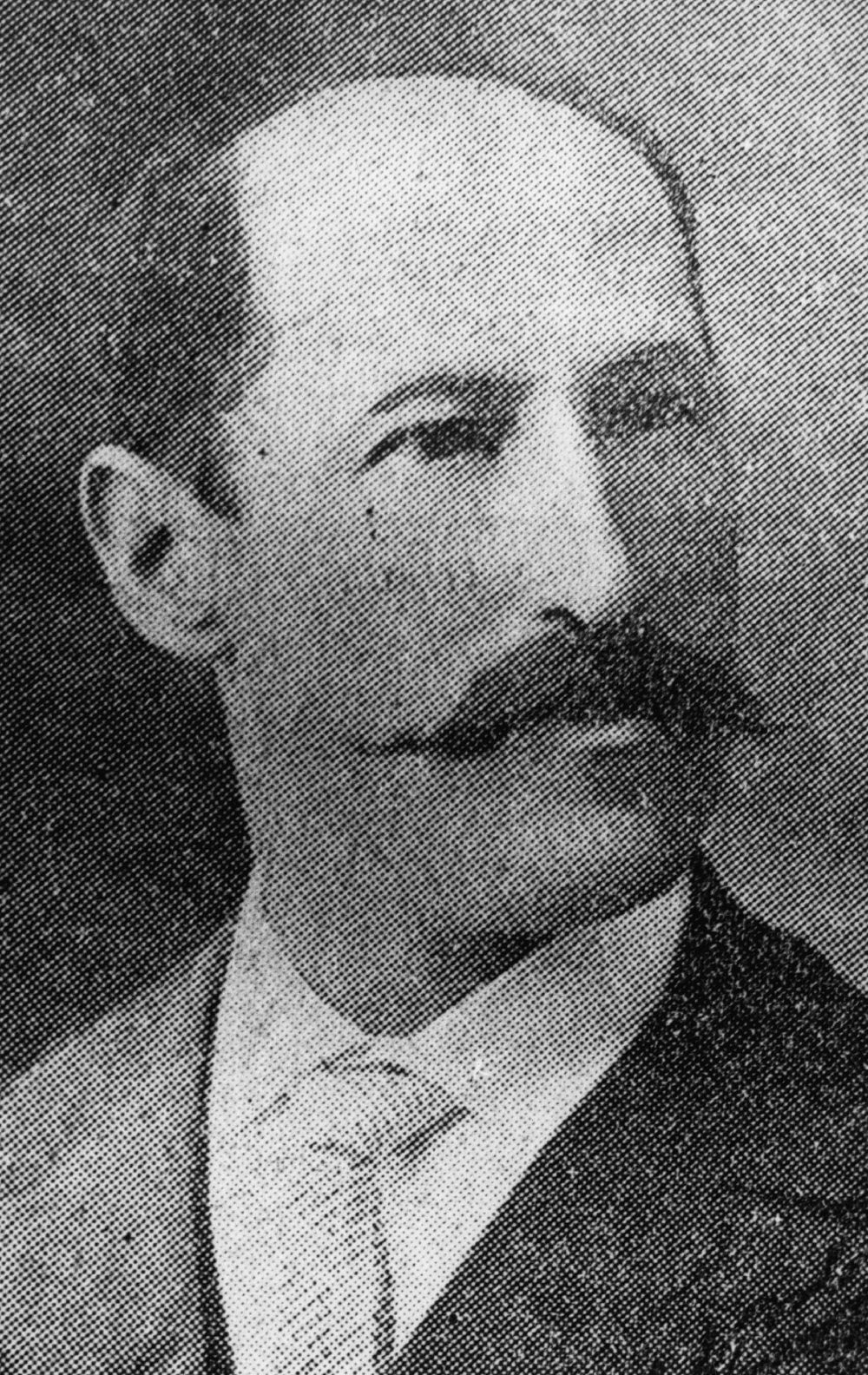
Hermann Rosendorff

Hermann Rosendorff (1860–1935) was a violinist, composer, and music educator. He was born in Berlin, and arrived in Australia in 1879.

== Music career ==
By 1887 Hermann Rosendorff was first violin in J. B. Hickie's Theatre orchestra, and he enjoyed a career of thirty years involvement with His Majesty's Brisbane.

Hermann Rosendorff is also remembered for conducting the J. C. Williamson productions over a thirty-year span.

Shortly after his arrival in Brisbane, Rosendorff gained recognition for his violin performance.

As well as being a performer, Hermann Rosendorff taught violin, and arranged and composed for piano and violin.

== Personal ==
Rosendorff married Genevra Hartley Hutchinson on 21 November 1883.

Hermann Rosendorff's eldest daughter Fanny Turbayne (née Rosendorff, 1885–1969) was also a composer.

Rosendorff died in Queensland on 6 January 1935, survived by his widow, five daughters and four sons.

== Works ==
- Berceuse tzigane (Zigeuners Wiegenlied) pour violon et piano
- Crown of Gold orchestral overture
- Frangipanni serenade for violin and piano
- Meditation (for violin solo)
- The Old Folks at Home (transcription for violin and piano)
- Romance et Rondeau fantastique (for violin and piano)
- Serenade pour violon et piano
- Summer orchestral overture
- Ungeduld (an arrangement of a Franz Schubert piece, for piano)
