= Rudolph Polk =

American violinist

Rudolph Polk (25 November 1892 New York, New York – 16 June 1957 Los Angeles) was an American concert violinist based in New York City during his early years and, during his later years, a Hollywood film director, film industry executive, and artist manager for Jascha Heifetz, Vladimir Horowitz, José Iturbi, and Gregor Piatigorsky. In Hollywood, Polk was the assistant musical director to Morris Stoloff at Columbia Pictures. After World War II, Polk was musical director for Enterprise Studios.

Polk was family friends with Jacob Previn, father of André and Steve Previn.

== Musical training ==
Polk graduated from the Hochschule für Musik in Berlin where he studied violin with Henri Marteau. He performed many times with the Berlin Philharmonic in the Early 1920s. He also toured with Feodor Chaliapin (and his longtime piano accompanyist, Fyodor Keneman) in the United States. Polk also studied composition with Paul Juon.

== Filmography ==
As music supervisor

- They Shall Have Music, Jascha Heifetz (as himself) (1939) (Polk is uncredited)

As musical director

- Body and Soul, Enterprise Productions, Inc. (1947)
- The Other Love (1947)
- Ramrod (1947)
- Arch of Triumph, Enterprise Productions, Inc. (1948)
- Four Faces West, Enterprise Studios (1948)
- No Minor Vices (1948)
- Caught, Enterprise Productions, Inc. (1949)
- A Kiss for Corliss (1949)

As songwriter

- Arch of Triumph, Enterprise Productions, Inc. (1948)

Song: Long After Tonight, music by Rudolph Polk, words by Ervin Drake (Polk is uncredited in the film)

As producer

- Adventures in Music, Artist Films, Inc. (documentary) (1944)
- Of Men and Music (documentary) (1951)
- Jan Peerce, Marian Anderson & Andrés Segovia, produced by Rudolph Polk and Bernard Luber; director, Irving Reis; writer, Harry Hurnitz

As film scorer

- The Private Affairs of Bel Ami (1947)

Polk was borrowed from Enterprise Studios to score the film

- Force of Evil

== Television ==
As producer

- Adventures of Superman (1952 series)

== Family ==
Rudolph married Pauline née Stone (1896–1986) in Manhattan, New York, on Mar 16, 1919. They had two children, Peter and Martha (Hamilton).

== Posthumous memorial scholarship ==
Jascha Heifetz and Gregor Piatigorsky helped fund the posthumous Rudolph Polk Memorial Scholarship at Claremont Colleges.
