= Ineke Hans =

Dutch industrial designer (born 1966)

- Born: Ineke Hans; November 18, 1966 (age 59); Zelhem, Netherlands
- Education: MA: Royal College of Art, London; BA: Artez, Arnhem
- Known for: Design, Industrial design
- Awards: Red Dot Awards, Design Plus Awards, Good Design Awards
- Website: www.inekehans.com

Ineke Hans (born November 18, 1966) is a Dutch industrial designer.

== Biography ==
Ineke Hans started studying Art at Hogeschool voor de Beeldende Kunsten in Arnhem (now ArtEZ) but soon switched to study 3D design. In 1991 she graduated with one-off furniture and small-batch products at the Product Design Department. She moved to London in 1993 and graduated with an MA in Furniture design from the Royal College of Art in 1995. Vico Magistretti had been visiting tutor during her time there. After graduation Habitat UK asked her to work with them as a furniture designer, but soon she was also designing accessories for them. After 2 years she started to develop furniture herself. In 1997 this resulted in a self-initiated design presentation in The Tramshed, a derelict building in East London.

In 1998 Hans focused on her own work and started her design studio back in Arnhem (NL). From 2003 onwards she started to work more and more for manufacturers. Her clients include RoyalVKB, Ahrend, Arco (Netherlands), Iittala (Finland) Offecct (Sweden), SCP (UK) Magis (Italy). Her work can be found in international museum collections of a.o. Stedelijk Museum Amsterdam, Museum Boijmans Van Beuningen Rotterdam, Victoria and Albert Museum London, Musée des Arts Décoratifs Paris, The Art Institute of Chicago. In 2009 Hans was Guest of Honour at the Stockholm Furniture Fair and in 2012 at the Budapest Design Fair. In 2014 she was special guest at designblok Prague. Hans is regular involved in international talks and debates on design.

In 2014-2015 Hans was guest professor Productdesign at the University of Kassel (Germany) where she looked into 'unplugged' and 'the future of furniture' with her students. In 2015 Ineke moved back to London. From here she works on projects with her studio in Holland and on a research project 'future scenarios for furniture design and consequently the changing role of the designer'. To do so, she has started up STUDIO|SALON. Through columns, events and a row of round table conversations with experts in the field of furniture design, queer thinkers, international visitors and experts on human behavior and mobility, Salon tries to redefine perspectives for design and the role of the designer. This resulted in a wrap-up event in London with an exhibition, last salon talks and a Pamphlet that carried 12 mottos to act upon for design and designers. In October 2017 Ineke Hans was appointed Professor Design in Social Context at the Universität der Künste in Berlin. References:

She has also turned her attentions to the world of textiles, designing the patterns of luxury carpets.

== Solo presentations (selection) ==
- 2020 Geel als citroen, rood als tomaat - Museum Valkhof, Nijmegen (in cooperation with artist Erik Mattijssen)
- 2017 Was ist Loos - Kunsthalle Wien, Vienna
- 2016 Cuckoo Eggs, rethinking and updating furniture for 2017 and beyond, V&A Museum, London
- 2015 Seven Chairs in Seven Days - Stedelijk Museum Amsterdam
- 2010 MIND SETS, Aram Gallery, London
- 2010 MIND SETS, Museum Arnhem
- 2007 Some'thing to read, Milan, Prague, Ljubljana
- 2006 Cheap Chic, Tools Galerie, Paris
- 2006 Mayday for Playday, Vivid gallery Rotterdam
- 2005 Craft in Dialogue, Nationalmuseet, Stockholm
- 2003 True Life, Kunstmuseum Den Haag

== Group Shows (selection) ==
- 2015 Inside Out: Furniture from the Crafts Council collection, London (UK)
- 2015 Oracles du design, CNAP, Paris (Fr)
- 2015 Design Derby, Design Museum Gent (B) and Boymans van Beuningen (NL)
- 2014 Dutch Supermodels a.o. in Milan, Stedelijk Museum Amsterdam (NL)
- 2013 Vom Stand der Dinge, Willem Wagenfeld Haus, Bremen (G)
- 2013 Handmade, Boymans van Beuningen (NL)
- 2012 Rethinking Typologies, The Art Institute of Chicago (USA)
- 2011 New Olds, Design Museum Holon, (Is)
- 2011 Making Histories in T2, Stedelijk Museum Amsterdam (NL)
- 2009 Telling tales, Victoria&Albert Museum, London (UK)
- 2007 Vazen met tuiten, Kunstmuseum Den Haag (NL)
- 2006 High Tech, Low Tech, Textielmuseum, Tilburg (NL)
- 2004 Wonder Holland in Trajan's Forum, Rome (It)
- 2002 Milan in a van, Victoria&Albert Museum, London (UK)
- 1999 Dutch Individuals, Spaxio Consolo, Milan (It)
- 1996 Selfproducing designers, Stedelijk Museum Amsterdam (NL)
- 1989 Gallery Antonia Jannone, Milan (It)

== Awards and Achievements (selection) ==
- 2016 Green Good Designaward for Smallroom/O2asis program Offecct
- 2013-2015 worldwide recognition and publications on projects for award-winning Fogo Island Inn
- 2013 Red Dot Award for Samllroom, Offecct
- 2012 Good Design Award for Smallroom, Offecct
- 2012 Möbelfacta (ecolabel) for Smallroom, Offecct
- 2011 Good Design Award for Ahrend 380
- 2011 Design Factory Prize with Ahrend for Ahrend 380
- 2011 Dutch design Award finalist with Ahrend 380
- 2011 GIO Award for Ahrend 380
- 2010 Red Dot Award for Sound panel GEO
- 2010 Design Plus Award for ID Cutlery, Royal VKB
- 2008 GIO Award for Nutcracker, Royal VKB
- 2008 Northsea Pearl for Garlic Crusher, Royal VKB
- 2007 Design Plus Award for Bowl&Spoon, Royal VKB
- 2006 Design Plus Award for Garlic Crusher, Royal VKB
- 2006 Red Dot Award for Bowl&Spoon, Royal VKB
- 2005 RED DOT Award for Garlic Crusher, Royal VKB

== Publications ==
- 2020 Geel als citroen, rood als tomaat - text by Hans Piena, Hedwig Saam, Erik Mattijssen
- 2017 Was ist Loos? – texts by Deyan Sudjic, Bart Loostma, Oliver Stratford
- 2017 Explore & Act – pamphlet on the future of design, editing and introduction by Johanna Agerman Ross
- 2010 Mind Sets – texts by Walter Bettens, Zoë Ryan, Lucy Bullivant, Catherine Geel
- 2003 Black Bazaar – text by Ed van Hinte
- 1997 Eidetic Furniture – text by Lucy Bullivant
