= Michael Schultz (gallerist) =

German gallerist (1951–2021)

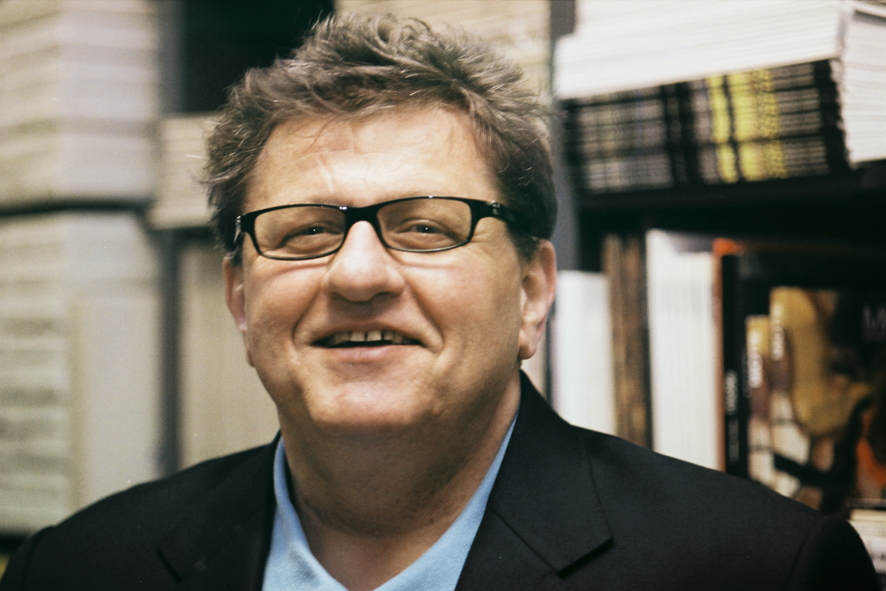
- Michael Schultz in 2008
- Born: November 4, 1951; Freudenstadt
- Died: December 28, 2021 (aged 70)
- Occupation: Gallerist

Michael Schultz (November 4, 1951 – December 28, 2021) was an internationally active German gallerist. Michael Schultz Gallery / Galerie Michael Schultz operated in Berlin, Germany, Beijing, and Seoul. Thus, he ran four galleries on two continents. The galleries provided cultural exchange, as Asian artists are shown in Europe and vice versa. The Galerie Michael Schultz GmbH & Co.KG was dissolved on November 7, 2019, due to the opening of insolvency proceedings. Schultz died of a brief, serious illness on December 28, 2021.

== Biography and career ==
Born in Freudenstadt in Germany’s Black Forest on November 4, 1951, Michael Schultz studied Music and Theater at the Freie Universität Berlin (1974–78). He was editor in chief of the now defunct "Berliner Kunstmagazin". He went on to become the managing director of the Michael Wewerka gallery (Berlin). In 1986, he founded Galerie Michael Schultz, and branched out in 2005 with "Schultz Contemporary". In the same year, he also founded a gallery in Seoul (director: Cho Sung-sun), and in 2006, he established his fourth gallery, in Beijing (director: Hu Huijun). The gallery closed in 2012. From 1985 to 2007, he served on the advisory board of Art Cologne art fair, and has been a member of the Art Committee KIAF, Seoul, Korea since 2005. Since 2007, he has also been a member of the Admission Committee for the "Art Fair.21", Cologne, Germany. He was the Co-Founder of the "MunichContempo" art fair, Munich, Germany, which started in 2010. Michael Schultz was among most major art fairs' regular exhibitors, such as ARCO Madrid, Art Miami, and Armory New York. Michael Schultz also closely collaborated with several international museums, for which he curated and organized exhibitions, such as the Georg-Kolbe-Museum in Berlin and the Kunsthalle Rostock, the Today Art Museum, Beijing and with both the National Museum of Contemporary Art and the Gwangju Museum of Art in South Korea. On February 24, 2012, the 'Korean City of Art' Gwangju bestowed him with its honorary citizenship.

== Arrest and gallery closure ==
Michael Schultz was arrested on October 17, 2019, in his Charlottenburg apartment on suspicion of selling artwork with forged authenticity certificates. Prior to his arrest, a friend of Schultz was planning to sell a Gerhard Richter painting at Christie's in New York City with an estimate of €800,000 - 1,000,000. The painting was previously given to the anonymous commissioner by Schultz as a form of payment. Upon background check with the Gerhard Richter Archive, it became apparent that the picture was fake, as the authentic work was previously displayed in the Schultz gallery in 2014, where it appeared differently. After his arrest, the gallery subsequently closed its doors. Schultz was not imprisoned due to his health, according to the German press. The remaining gallery stock is to be sold by a Cologne auction house named Van Ham through the insolvency administrator in June 2022.

== Artists represented ==
Michael Schultz mainly represented contemporary figurative artists from Germany, Switzerland, Austria, China, and Korea, like, in alphabetical order, Sonja Alhäuser, Arif Aziz, Chen Wenbo, Andy Denzler, Sven Drühl, Tommy Fitzpatrick, Feng Lu, Kristina Girke, Burkhard Held, Huang He, Huang Min, Stephan Kaluza, Kim Yusob, Bernd Kirschner, Ingo Kühl, Helge Leiberg, Ma Jun, Joel Morrison, Römer+Römer, Manfred-Michael Sackmann, Cornelia Schleime, SEO, Bong Chae Son, Maik Wolf, Zhu Cao. On the secondary market he worked with Georg Baselitz, Markus Lüpertz, A. R. Penck, Sigmar Polke, Robert Rauschenberg, Gerhard Richter.

== Publications ==
More than 200 publications on curated artists and exhibitions:

- Michael Schultz, German Idealism and Eastern Teachings. Basics of the Oeuvre of Joseph Beuys. In: Everyone is an Artist. Gwangju 2011 (exhibition catalogue Gwangju 25.8.-06.11. 2011).
- Michael Schultz (ed.): SEO. Personal Cosmos. Katalogbuch zur Ausstellung in Venedig. Biennale 04.06.2011-27.11.2011. Munich: Hirmer 2011. ISBN 978-3-7774-4111-5
- Michael Schultz / Arie de Knecht (edd.): Amador, Norbert Bisky, Burkhard Held, Jörg Immendorff, Stephan Kaluza, Katrin Kampmann, Helge Leiberg, Huang Min, Römer + Römer, Cornelia Schleime, SEO, u. a. Auf dem Weg ins Licht - Sammlung de Knecht. Berlin 2007. ISBN 978-3-939983-14-9
- Michael Schultz (ed.): A. R. Penck. Neue Arbeiten. Berlin 2007. ISBN 3-939983-13-6
- Michael Schultz (ed.): Robert Rauschenberg. selected works 1974–1999. Berlin 2007. ISBN 3-939983-06-3
- Michael Schultz (ed.): Norbert Bisky. Schlachteplatte. Berlin 2003.
- Michael Schultz (ed.): A. R. Penck. Variationen über ein Thema. Berlin 2002.
- Michael Schultz (ed.): Amador. Emersions. Berlin 2002.
- Michael Schultz (ed.): Luciano Castelli. Arbeiten aus den Jahren 1979 bis 1999. Berlin 2001.
- Michael Schultz (ed.): Markus Lüpertz. Gemälde aus den Jahren 1994–1999. Berlin 2000.
- Michael Schultz (ed.): A. R. Penck. Dogma und Dialektik. Berlin 1999.
- Michael Schultz (ed.): Amador. Arbeiten 1994–1997. Berlin 1997.
- Michael Schultz (ed.): Amador. Februar-März 1995. Berlin 1995.
