= Römer + Römer =

German-Russian artist couple

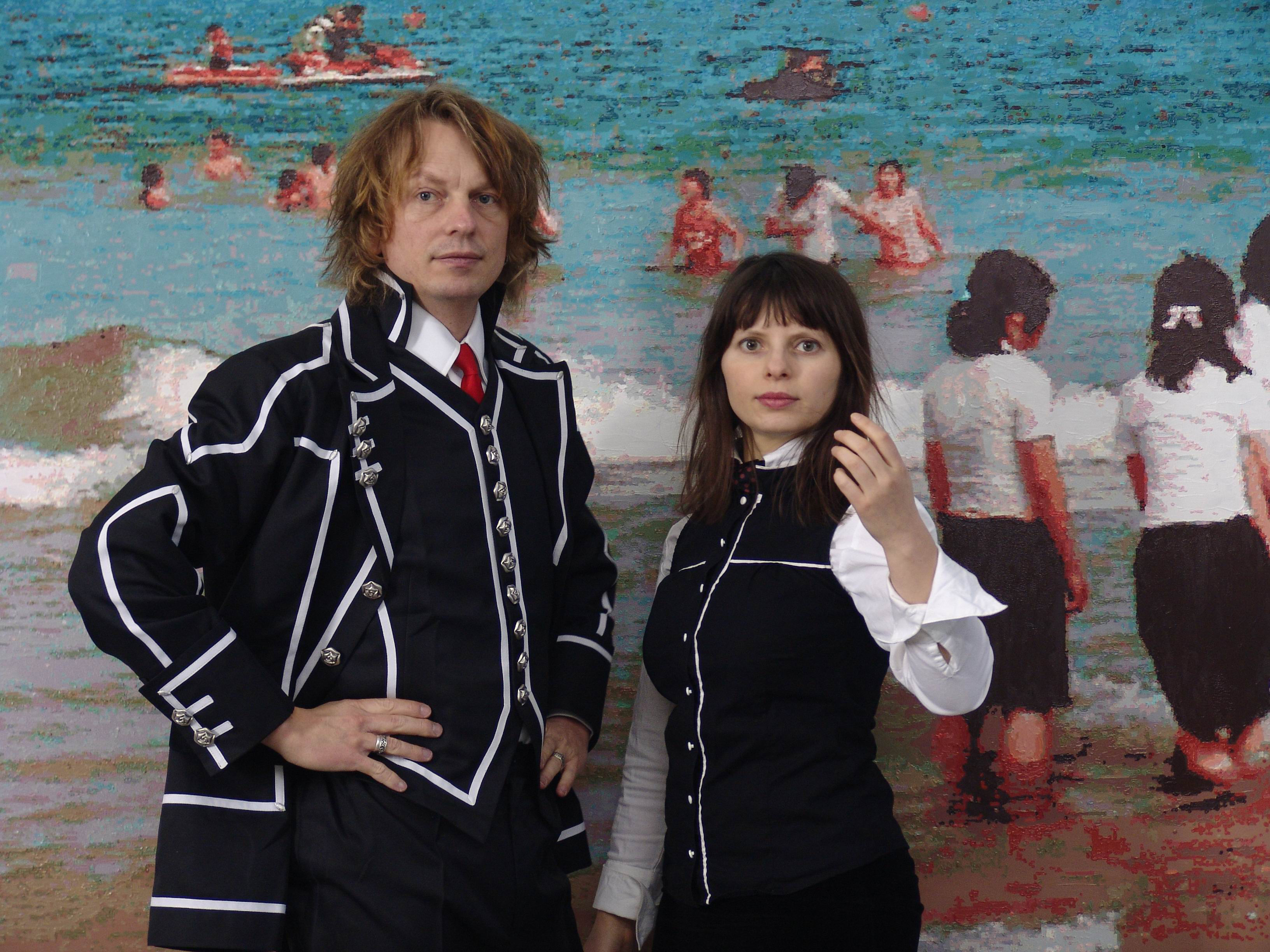
Selfie of the artists Römer+Römer, 2010

Römer + Römer (Torsten and Nina Römer) are a German-Russian artist couple living and working in Berlin, Germany.

== Biography ==
Torsten Römer was born 1968 in Aachen, Germany. Nina Römer, née Tangian, 1978 in Moscow, Russia. Both studied painting at the Staatliche Kunstakademie (State Art Academy) Düsseldorf under A. R. Penck and both were his "Meisterschüler" (master students). Nina Römer is the granddaughter of the Soviet-era writer Yury Trifonov and the great-granddaughter of the Ukrainian-Russian-Soviet painter Amshey Nurenberg. 1996 Torsten Römer received a travel grant from the Kunstverein Düsseldorf (Society of Arts). In 2011 they were bestowed with the special award of the Lucas Cranach Prize of the City of Kronach, Germany. Nina and Torsten have been collaborating since 1998.

== Works ==
Römer + Römer create paintings and drawings mostly based on their own photography, make performances, and curate shows.. In 1998 they commenced their long-term art project “M°A°I°S”. Their works often incorporate historical and political references: 2005 the Berlin show “Der freie Wille” (“The free will”) was part of the jubilee events for 20 years of “Glasnost”. And 2004 “HA KYROPT – Russische Kunst heute” (“Na Kurort [at the spa] – Russian Art Today”) in Baden-Baden related to the city's close ties with Russians spa-guests since the times of the Tsar. In such projects Römer + Römer provide an aesthetic reconstruction of historical and political situations. Their motifs are mostly festivities, pageants, parties, and social and political events.. In a 2013/14 series they covered the carnival in Brasil ("Sambódromo"). Technically Römer + Römer set out from self-taken photographs which are subjected to image processing, the computer taking the traditional role of the sketchbook. The pictorial idea finds its artistic form in paintings showing a pixel-structure. The pixels, however, are different from digital pixels as they possess inner structures. This way Römer + Römer's art is related to Pointillism, and one may also see references to stipple engraving. The motifs are distributed over planes of colour and fragmented into thousands of painted dots, which, seen from a certain distance, merge in the eye of the beholder to form a focussed image. The closer one comes to the canvas, the more the figures and objects dissolve into an abstract and dynamic interplay of colours. Their latest large series treats the "Burning Man" festival in the Nevada desert (2017/2018). Light from fires and LED-installations, art cars, freak temporary artworks, "burns", and parties for, the subject core of a recognisable painterly aesthetic.

== Exhibitions (selection) ==
- Die große Laterne, Kunstverein Coburg, Coburg (2026)
- Pirates on the Playa, Marburger Kunstverein, Marburg (2024)
- Straight to the point, Galerie Urs Reichlin, Zug (2021)
- Radical Ritual, Lachenmann Art, Frankfurt (2020)
- Burning Man – Electric Sky, Haus am Lützowplatz, Berlin (2019)
- Face to Face – Gesichter der Sammlung Hense, Kunsthalle Hense, Gescher (2018)
- Sturmhöhen [Wuthering Heights], Schafhof – Europäischen Künstlerhaus Oberbayern, Freising (2018)
- ¿Qué dices?, Espronceda, Barcelona (2017)
- Generalstreik, Kunstverein Münsterland, Coesfeld (2017)
- Kiss – From Rodin to Bob Dylan, Bröhan-Museum, Berlin (2017)
- Wilhelm-Morgner-Preis Ausstellung, Museum Wilhelm Morgner, Soest (2017)
- Party Sträflinge, Kunstverein Kunstkreis Hameln (2016)
- 56th Venice Biennale, Pavillon of Mauritius (2015)
- Hamster – Hipster – Handy. Im Bann des Mobiltelefons, Museum Angewandte Kunst, Frankfurt a. M. (2015)
- Party-Löwe, Freight & Volume, New York (2014)
- Alles für Alle, Richard-Haizmann-Museum, Niebüll (2014)
- Face to Face, Zhan Zhou International Center of Contemporary Art in Beijing (2013)
- Sambódromo, Galerie Michael Schultz, Berlin (2013)
- Punkt-Systeme – Vom Pointillismus zum Pixel, Wilhelm-Hack-Museum, Ludwigshafen (2012)
- Megacool 4.0 – Jugend und Kunst, Künstlerhaus Vienna, Vienna (2012)
- Menschenbilder – Der internationale Lucas-Cranach-Preis, Cranach-Foundation, Wittenberg (2012)
- Biennale of Contemporary Art, D-O ARK Underground, Konjic (2011)
- Pride in Brighton, Galerie Michael Schultz, Berlin (2011)
- O tu mir das nicht an!, Kunsthalle Rostock (2010/2011)
- Fighting for freedom, Gwangju Art Museum, Gwangju (2010)
- Inter-cool 3.0 – Jugend Bild Medien, Hartware MedienKunstVerein, Dortmund (2010)
- Die Flut, Galerie Michael Schultz, Berlin (2010)
- Based on a true story, Today Art Museum, Beijing (2009)
- Gemeinsam in Bewegung – Zeitgenössische Kunst aus Deutschland und China, Wuhan Art Museum, Wuhan (2009)
- second life in Peking, Galerie Mathias Kampl, Munich (2009)
- Terrorist No. 1, Kunstverein Heidelberg (2009)
- „EMERGENCY BIENNALE Chechnya / Bialystok“ and „EMERGENCY BIENNALE Chechnya / World Tour“, Grozny (2008 and 2006)
- Auf dem Weg ins Licht: Werke aus der Sammlung de Knecht, Kunsthalle Rostock (2007/2008)
- Sense of Life, Hyundai Gallery, Seoul (2007)
- HA KYPOPT!, Kunsthalle Baden-Baden (2004)
- Paradise – International Forum of Art Initiatives, Neue Manege, Moscow (2004)
- International Festival of new technologies in contemporary art, St. Petersburg's Center of Visual Arts, St. Petersburg (2003)
- Liverpool Biennial, Liverpool (2002)
- Big Torino, Torino Biennale, Turin (2002)

== Publications ==
=== Art Project M°A°I°S ===
- M°A°I°S 2 – Der Tod, Berlin 2001
- M°A°I°S 4 – The good and the bad, Berlin 2003
- M°A°I°S 5 – Paradies, Berlin 2004
- M°A°I°S 6 – Der freie Wille, Berlin 2005

== Sources ==
- Peter Funken, Römer + Römer. Meer der Freundschaft, Prestel: Munich et al. 2011, ISBN 978-3791345086.
- Gerhard Charles Rump, Rekonstruktionen. Positionen zeitgenössischer Kunst, B&S Siebenhaar: Berlin, 2010, ISBN 978-3936962369
- Mathias Winzen und Georgy Nikitsch (Hgg.), HA KYPOPT! Russische Kunst Heute, Cologne 2004, ISBN 978-3879098354
