= Burkhard Held =

German painter

Burkhard Held is German painter living and working in Berlin, Germany. His art is based on figuration dissolving into abstraction.

== Biography ==
Held was born in 1953. He studied at the Berlin University of the Arts as a "Meisterschüler" (Master Disciple) of Dietmar Lemcke from 1972 to 1979, and was granted a scholarship at Garrucha (Spain) by the "German National Academic Foundation" (Studienstiftung des Deutschen Volkes). In 1993 he became professor at the Berlin University of the Arts. and later served as a professor at the China Academy of Art ("Chinesisch-deutsche Kunstakademie") in Hangzhou, PRC. Held is responsible for the organization of the cooperation of the Berlin University of the Arts and China.

== Work ==
Burkhard Held is a figurative painter, who dissolves his motifs – landscapes, portraits, flowers – into color fields with a strong tendency towards autonomy. His strongly colored all-over images reinterpret things as abstract and then lead the back into figuration. In 2009 Held started to dedicate himself to the subject of flowers: blossoms become compositions with a landscape character, and are distributed in equally strong colors across the canvas. Thus they gain lyrical overtones and additional brightness. Hence Held has also begun to contrast figurative elements (such as the sky) - intentionally without painterly differentiation - with a hatching-like color field technique; this in traditional, monumental formats of his work.

== Exhibitions (selection) ==
- 2011 – 2012 Kleine Welten – Große Kunst im kleinen Format, CAS, Salzburg, Austria
- 2009 Monuments in Time, Michael Schultz Gallery, Beijing, China
- 2009 River deep, Mountain high, Michael Schultz Gallery, Berlin
- 2008 Walk the Line, Cooperativa de Actividades Artísticas, Porto (Portugal)
- 2008 Close-Up, Por Amor À Arte Galeria, Porto (Portugal)
- 2007 100 Jahre Kunsthalle Mannheim, Kunsthalle Mannheim
- 2007 Path of the sun, Keumsan Gallery, Heyri (Korea)
- 2007 Auf dem Weg ins Licht, Sammlung de Knecht, Kunsthalle Rostock
- 2006 Uzpuolimas!, Gallerija Vartai, Vilnius (Lithuania)
- 1998 Berliner Fenster, Galerie Brusberg, Berlin
