= Bisky =

Bisky is a surname. Notable people with the surname include:

- Jens Bisky (born 1966), German journalist and non-fiction author, son of Lothar and brother of Norbert
- Lothar Bisky (1941–2013), German politician
- Norbert Bisky (born 1970), German painter
