= Johann König (art dealer) =

German art dealer

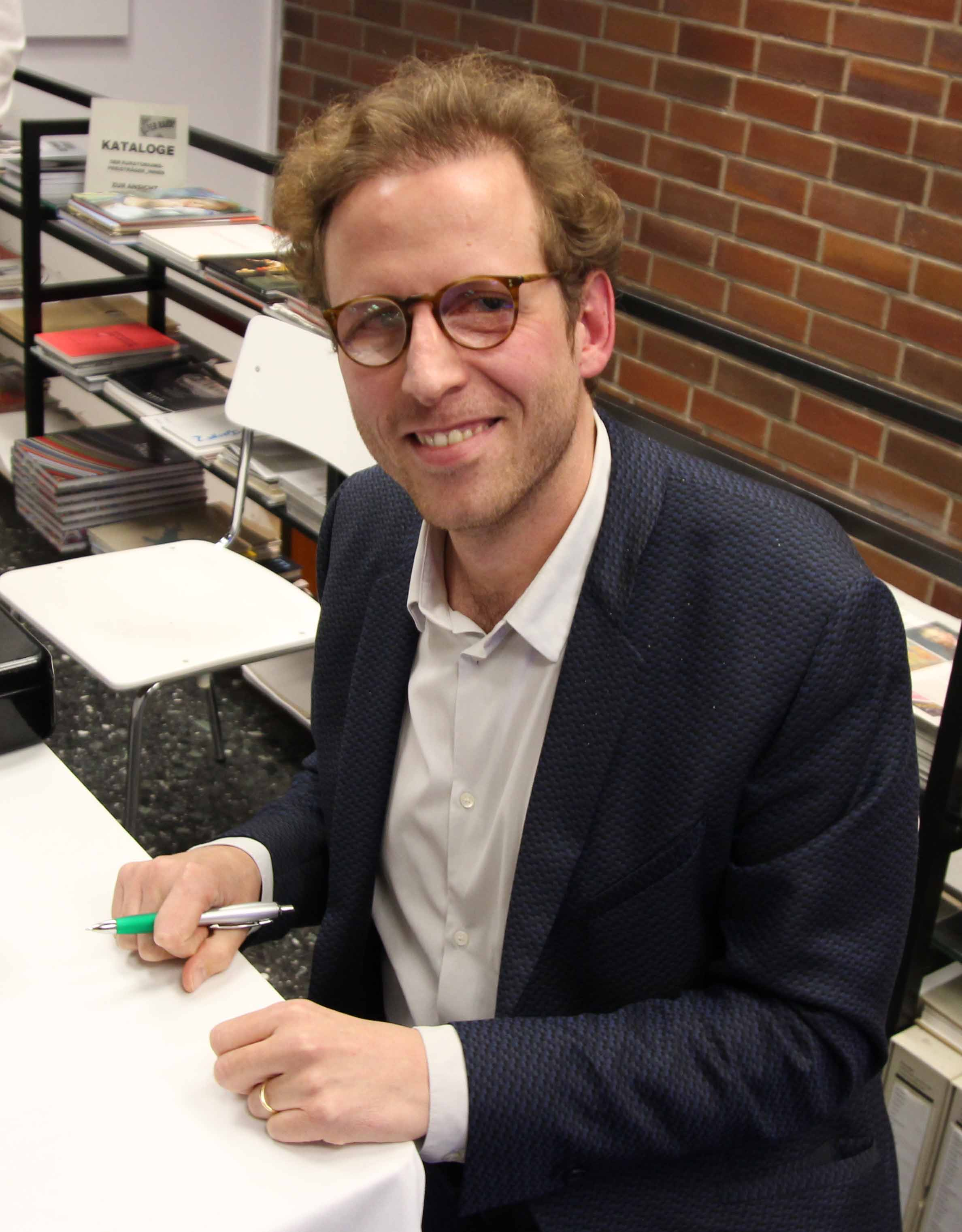
- Born: 22 July 1981 (age 45); Cologne, West Germany
- Occupations: Art dealer and gallery owner
- Parent(s): Kasper König; Edda Köchl-König

Johann König (born 22 July 1981) is a German art dealer, and the founder of König Galerie.

== Early life and education ==
König was born in Cologne in 1981 to Edda Köchl-König, an illustrator and actress, and to Kasper König, an art professor, curator, and former director of Museum Ludwig. In his youth König was already very influenced by the artists his father worked with – among others: Dan Graham, On Kawara, M.C. Escher, Richard Artschwager, Joseph Beuys, and Jörg Immendorff. After a childhood accident at the age of eleven, Johann became partially blind.

== König Galerie ==
The gallery's focus is on museum exhibitions. König was repeatedly listed in ArtReview's "Power 100" list. In 2011, he won FIAC's Prix Lafayette together with Helen Marten for the solo exhibition "Take a stick and make it sharp", on the grounds that it was considered to be "the best exhibition project presented by an emerging gallery".

The gallery participates in international art fairs such as Art Basel, Frieze Art Fair, and Art Cologne.

König describes the concept of his gallery as follows: "My strategy was always to have the best artists in their respective disciplines [...]. Some galleries try to focus on a school. They have a group of certain movements, say, Leipzig painters. I always try to have the most relevant representative from each field, so to speak." Elsewhere he said: "I really try to avoid having a school."

=== Locations ===
König Galerie was initially located at Rosa-Luxemburg-Platz, then moved to Dessauer Straße near Martin-Gropius-Bau and Neue Nationalgalerie in 2006.

In May 2015, König Galerie took up a second location at St Agnes in Kreuzberg, a former Catholic church complex that was built in the 1960s by the German architect and city planner Werner Düttmann and considered to be a prime example of Brutalism. It provides an exhibition space of 800 m^{2} (8,600 sq ft). In 2012, König signed a long-term lease for the complex, and it was converted by the German architect Arno Brandlhuber into an exhibition space for his gallery. The project, commissioned by Johann and Lena König, won the Berlin Architectural Prize 2016. Today, the building also accommodates other tenants, including New York University Berlin’s art studio.

In 2016, König Galerie reopened its original Dessauer Straße location for Gallery Weekend Berlin. Since the gallery moved into St Agnes, the space at Dessauer Straße is also the studio of Jeppe Hein.

In 2017, König Galerie opened a second location in a former 3,750 sq ft (348 m^{2}) underground carpark in London. In partnership with MCM Worldwide, the gallery later maintained space at MCM branches in Tokyo (2019–2020) and Seoul (since 2021). In 2021, the gallery opened a temporary branch at the Kleines Haus der Kunst in Vienna.

In 2023, König Galerie opened a second space in Berlin, in a complex that once housed the postal service’s telegraph office. In 2024, the gallery expanded to Munich with a new location at the Bergson Kunstkraftwerk. In 2027, König Galerie opens a new art and cultural venue in the former Heilig-Geist-Kirche in Meerbusch-Büderich, near Düsseldorf.

=== Programming ===
Since 2017, König Galerie has been publishing the KÖNIG Magazine, covering mostly artists from the gallery and also launched design and merchandise articles under the name KÖNIG Souvenir. In 2019, König published his autobiography Blinder Galerist, which was co-written with Daniel Schreiber.

In March 2020, right at the beginning of the newly enforced lockdown measures amid the COVID-19 pandemic in Germany, König began a Live Talk series on Instagram, 10am Series, featuring daily conversation with artists, collectors, and curators.

In June 2020, following the cancelation of Art Basel, König decided to hold his own art fair in his Berlin gallery. The fair offered more than 200 artworks from the first and secondary market and attracted about 4,000 visitors. Responding to the success of the first one, further editions were held.

=== Artists ===
König Galerie represents among others the following artists: Koo Jeong A, Kathryn Andrews, Micol Assaël, Evelyn Axell, Norbert Bisky, Claudia Comte, Jose Dávila, Tue Greenfort, Jeppe Hein, Karl Horst Hödicke, Robert Janitz, Annette Kelm, Manfred Kuttner, Alicja Kwade, Justin Matherly, Anselm Reyle, Michael Sailstorfer, Andreas Schmitten, John Seal, Chiharu Shiota, Monira Al Qadiri, Bosco Sodi, Matthias Weischer, Johannes Wohnseifer, David Zink Yi, and Erwin Wurm.

== Other activities ==
König was a member of the jury for the 2020 Berlin Architectural Prize. He is also part of the jury of the Berlin Masters Foundation, which annually awards the TOY BERLIN MASTERS AWARD, and of PArt, an initiative of the Spiegelberger Foundation in support of artists during the COVID-19 pandemic.

König's memoir, The Blind Gallerist, was first published in 2019 and later translated into English in 2022.

=== Lawsuits ===
Since 2019 he has faced multiple allegations of sexual misconduct. König's attorney obtained a total of five preliminary injunctions (Az. 324 O 397/22 & Az. 7 W 101/22) from the Hamburg Regional Court and Higher Regional Court because of false factual allegations and inadmissible reporting of suspicions. A court-imposed fine was issued against Die Zeit for a culpable break of one of the injunctions, and Die Zeit submitted a cease-and-desist undertaking. With the judgment of the court, essential parts of the reporting are prohibited.
