= Denzler =

Denzler is a surname. Notable people with the surname include:

- Andy Denzler (born 1965), Swiss artist
- Cynthia Denzler (born 1983), Colombian/American/Swiss alpine skier
- Ferdinand Denzler (1909–1991), Swiss water polo player
- Günther Denzler (born 1948), German politician
- Robert F. Denzler (1892–1972), Swiss composer and conductor
