= Gilles Dyan =

French art dealer (born 1960)

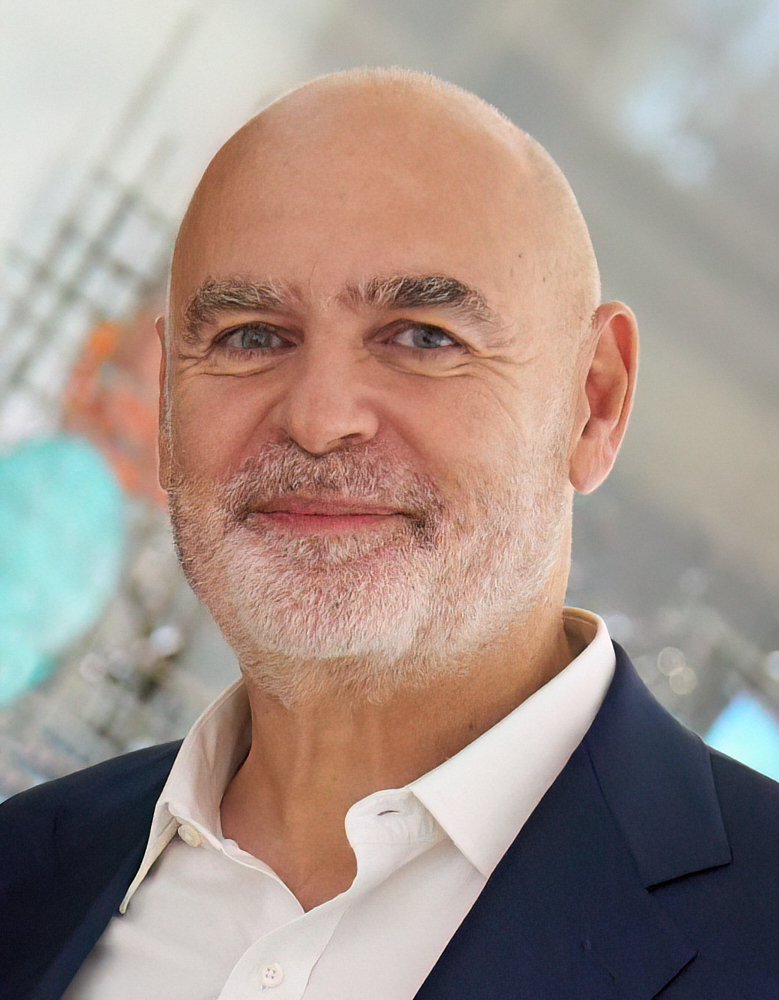
- Born: 1 October 1960; Tunis
- Occupation: Art dealer

Gilles Dyan (born 1960) is a French art dealer and founder and chairman of Opera Gallery, a modern and contemporary art gallery with sixteen exhibition spaces worldwide.

== Early life ==
Dyan was born on 1 October 1960 in Tunis, Tunisia, to a couple who were both schoolteachers. He was raised and educated in Paris.

== Career ==
Dyan originally studied and worked in marketing, and earned a living selling art prints, before opening the first Opera Gallery, in Singapore in 1994, followed shortly afterwards by another in Rue Saint-Honoré, in Paris, France. There are now sixteen outlets. They deal in works by modern masters (e.g. Picasso and Chagall), and work with contemporary artists such as David Kim Whittaker and Andy Denzler.

He became a member of the European Chamber of Expert-Advisors in Fine Art in 2000.

In 2021 he set up a 100 million euro investment fund, regulated in Luxembourg, to support the acquisition of works for resale and to provide guarantees at auction.
