= Kim Yusob =

South Korean artist (born 1959)

- Born: Kim Yusob; 1959 (age 66–67); Gwangju, South Korea
- Education: Chosun University; Universität der Künste Berlin

Korean name
- Hangul: 김유섭
- RR: Gim Yuseop
- MR: Kim Yusŏp

Kim Yusob (Korean: 김유섭; born 1959) is a South Korean artist who lives and works in Berlin, Germany and Seoul, South Korea.

== Biography ==
Kim was born in 1959 in Gwangju, South Korea.

After graduating from the Department of Fine Art at Chosun University, Gwangju, in 1983 Kim Yusob moved to Berlin. There he studied both at the Kunsthochschule Weissensee in East Berlin and at the Western Universität der Künste (University of the Arts). 1995 he became Meisterschüler (Master Disciple) of Wolfgang Petrick. Since 1996 Kim has been teaching at Chosun University, where he completed Graduate School in 2001. From 2007 on he has been teaching at the Universität der Künste (University of the Arts). In 2014 he became Professor of Painting at Chosun University.

== Works ==
Within his oeuvre Kim Yusob aims at providing new impulses for abstract expressionism. His process of painting unites religious, philosophical and Anthroposophical aspects. Much is left to hazard, for Kim considers his art a seismogram of his inner world. The (in an alchemical analogy) "first matter" of his painting is an amorphous and indefinite liquid mass. Thus the basic material already contains the final work of art. The artist merely brings it to light during the process of painting. Kim's conceit of a pre-defined matter closely resembles the Aristotelian concept of a teleological hyle, and has also been shared by artists such as Michelangelo or Edwin Landseer. Due to Kim's background it is also rooted in Daoism and the I Ching. Furthermore, Kim obtains a typical effect by applying special technique of decelerating the colours’ drying: Such their characteristic material quality prevails.

== Exhibitions (selection) ==
- A Landscape of Invisible Words - Gwangju Museum of Art (2023)
- solo show: Kim Yusob - Energy Flash – Galerie Michael Schultz, Berlin (2014)
- solo show: SPIRIT-PURE, Gallery Gahoedong60, Seoul (2012)
- solo show: Kim Yusob - Energy development - Kunsthalle Rostock (2012)
- Visions Of Paradise - Python Gallery, Erlenbach, Switzerland (2012)
- Black painting - The spirit of the Abstract - Nuri Gallery, Goyang Cultural Foundation Oulim Nuri, Ilsan (Korea) (2012)
- solo show: 'Kim Yusob - Gebanntes Licht – Galerie Michael Schultz, Berlin (2011)
- solo show: Kim Yusob - Galerie Helmut Leger, Munich (2010)
- solo show: Kim Yusob - CAS / Contemporary Art Space, Salzburg (2010)
- Feng Lu (China) - Skulpturen / Yusob Kim (Korea) Malerei - Der Mensch im Quadrat - KUNSTKABINETT, Regensburg (2008)
- Schwarze Bilder – Ephraim-Palais, Stadtmuseum Berlin (2006)
- Deep Action - Wolfgang Petrick und Meisterschüler (1975 – 2005) - Georg Kolbe Museum, Berlin (2005)

== Publications ==
- Kim Yusob: Schwarze Bilder (exhibition catalogue), Museum Ephraim-Palais, Berlin 2006.
- Ursel Berger, Lothar Romain, Karlheinz Lüdeking, James Kalm (edd.), Deep Action. Wolfgang Petrick und Meisterschüler. 1975-2000. (exhibition catalogue), Berlin 2005.
