= Sonja Alhäuser =

German artist (born 1969)

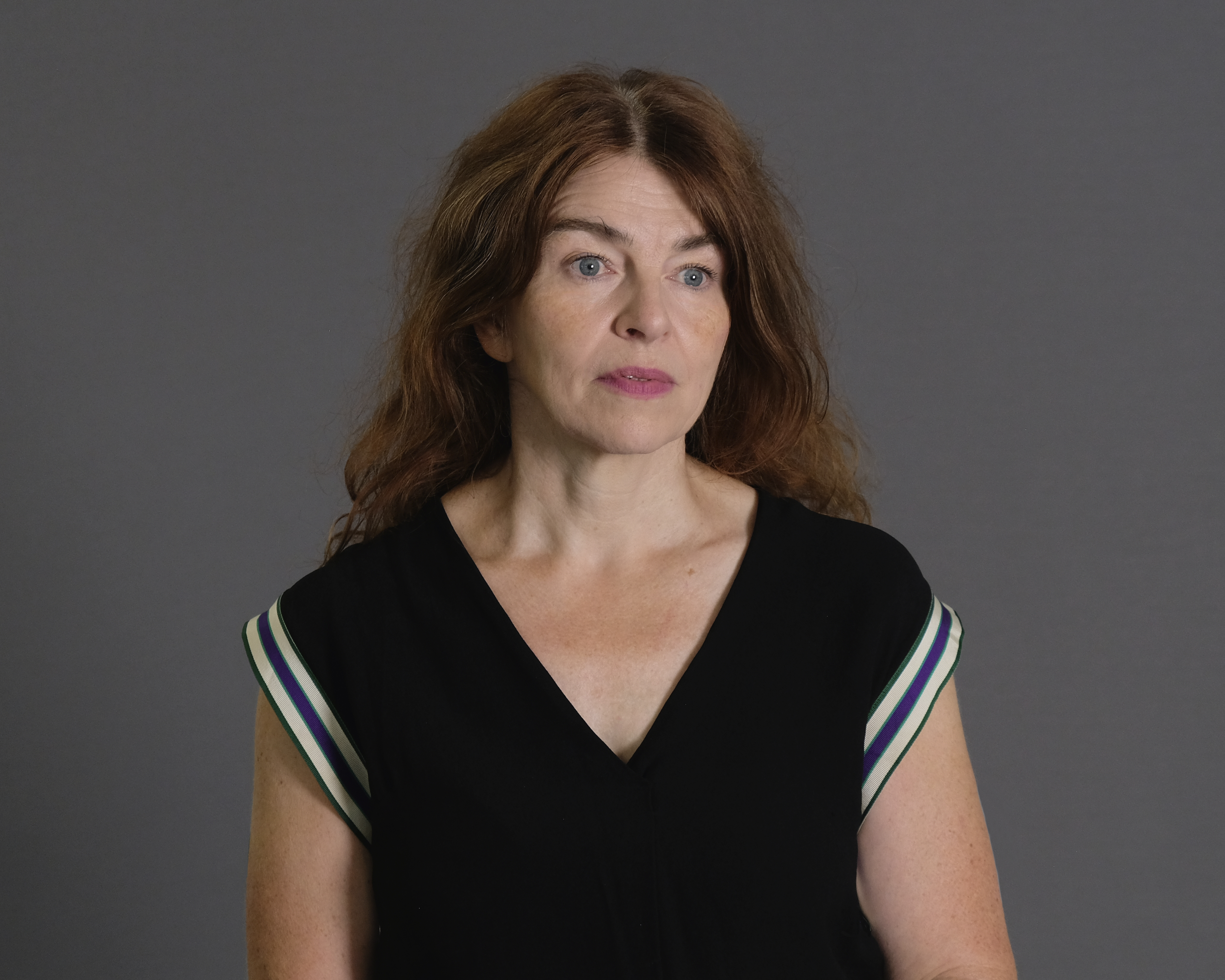
- Sonja Alhäuser 2025
- Born: 1969 (age 56–57); Kirchen
- Education: Kunstakademie Düsseldorf
- Awards: "Peter-Mertes-Scholarship" "Dorothea-Erxleben-Scholarship"

Sonja Alhäuser (born 1969) is a German artist.

== Biography ==
Sonja Alhäuser was born in Kirchen (Westerwald), Germany in 1969 and studied at the Staatliche Kunstakademie (State Art Academy) in Düsseldorf, becoming "Meisterschülerin" (Master Disciple) of Fritz Schwegler in 1995.

From 2002 to 2005, Alhäuser taught drawing at the University of Duisburg-Essen, and from 2007 to 2009 painting at the Braunschweig Academy. She has received a large number of awards, including the "Peter-Mertes-Scholarship" of the "Bonn Kunstverein" in 1997, the "Förderpreis der Stadt Düsseldorf" in 2000 and the "Dorothea Erxleben-Scholarship" of the Federal State of Lower Saxony, 2007–2009. She now lives and works in Berlin and is represented by Michael Schultz Gallery.

== Works ==
Alhäuser uses mixed media with focus on the transitory. Her materials have included food. Her work has been compared to Joseph Beuys, who likewise employed transitory materials like fat and honey. She also casts sculptures in German Silver and makes large wall drawings. She otherwise works in traditional media like watercolours, acrylic and crayon. Some of her work involves discourse on environmental ethics.

== Publications ==
- Sonja Alhäuser, Kunst in Schokolade, Gesellschaft für moderne Kunst am Museum Ludwig, Imhoff-Stollwerck-Museum (edd.), Cologne 2005
- Sonja Alhäuser, Immerzu, Cologne 2007
- Sonja Alhäuser, Hartgesotten, Städtische Galerie Delmenhorst / Kunstverein Ulm 2010
- Sonja Alhäuser, fundamentales Vielleicht, Galerie Michael Schultz, Berlin 2010
- Sonja Alhäuser, Maximelange, Galerie Michael Schultz, Berlin 2013
