= Opera Gallery =

Multinational galleries of modern and contemporary art

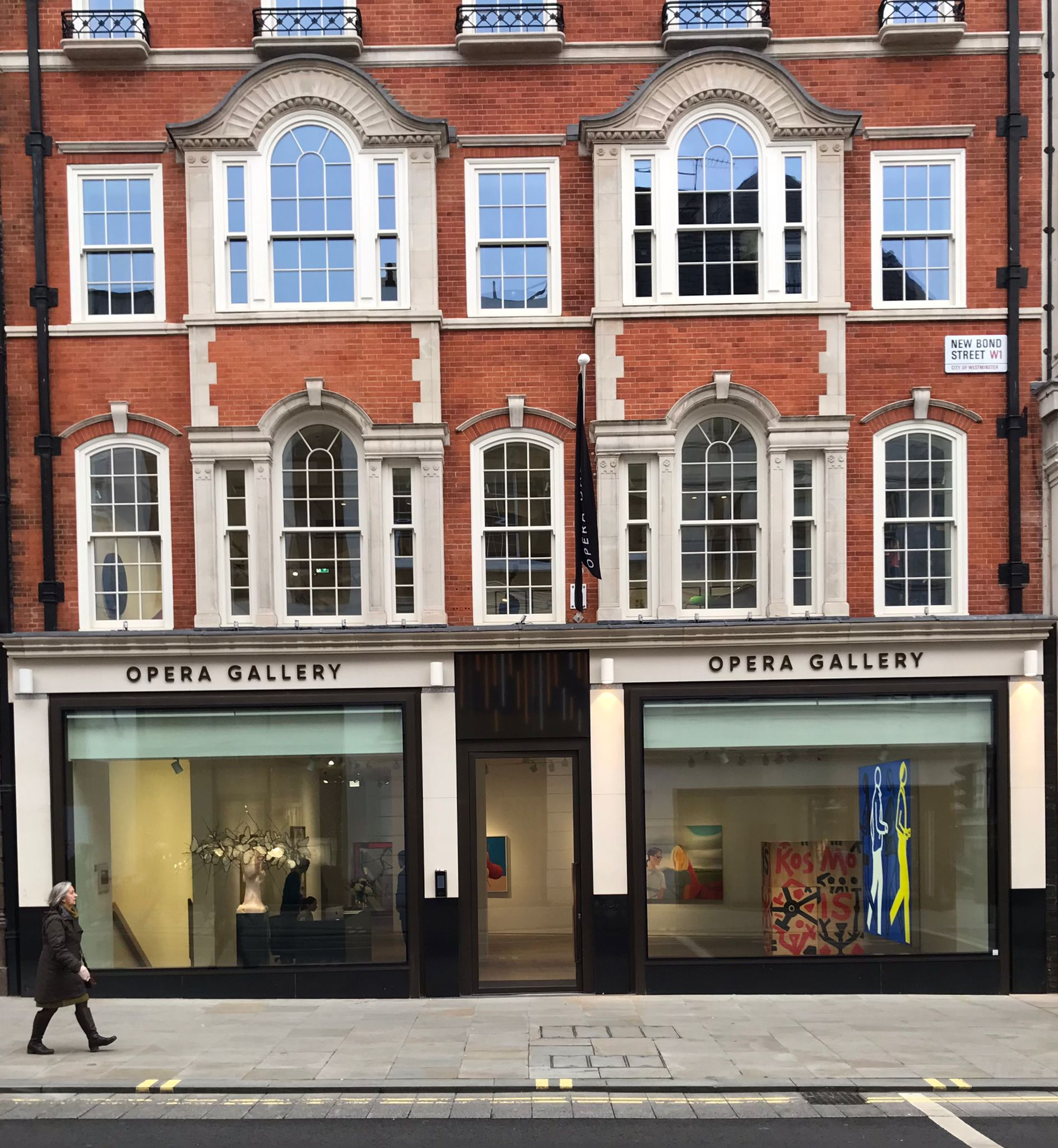
- Opera Gallery, New Bond Street, London, England
- Company type: Retail art gallery chain
- Industry: Modern and contemporary art
- Founded: 1994; 32 years ago
- Founder: Gilles Dyan
- Headquarters: London, England
- Area served: Multi-national
- Key people: Isabelle de La Bruyére (CEO)
- Website: www.operagallery.com

Opera Gallery is a modern and contemporary art gallery presenting work by established and emerging artists of the 20th and 21st centuries at 16 locations.

Founded in Paris in 1994 by Gilles Dyan, Opera Gallery now has sixteen exhibition spaces in New York, Miami, Bal Harbour, Madrid, Aspen, London, Paris, Monaco, Geneva (two spaces), Dubai (two spaces), Beirut, Hong Kong, Singapore and Seoul.

Opera Gallery represents Ellen Von Unwerth, Manolo Valdés, Juan Genovés, André Brasilier, Nick Gentry, Lita Cabellut, Pablo Atchugarry, Marcello Lo Giudice, Andy Denzler, David Kim Whittaker, David Mach, Jean-Marc Nahas and Umberto Mariani.

Isabelle de La Bruyére was appointed CEO in 2023.
