= SEO (artist) =

South Korean contemporary painter

- Born: Seo Soo-Kyoung; 1977 (age 48–49); Gwangju, South Korea
- Education: Chosun University; Universität der Künste Berlin

Korean name
- Hangul: 서수경
- RR: Seo Sugyeong
- MR: Sŏ Sugyŏng

Seo Soo-Kyoung (Korean: 서수경; born 1977), known by the artist name SEO (세오), is a South Korean contemporary artist who lives and works in Berlin, Germany. Her artist name comes from her family name Seo written in capital letters.

== Biography ==
Seo Soo-Kyoung was born in Gwangju, South Korea in 1977. She attended Gwangju Art High School from 1992 to 1996. From 1996 to 2000 she studied at Chosun University, also in Gwangju, receiving the award for the best student of the year upon her graduation. She left South Korea the same year to take up her studies at the Universität der Künste (University of the Arts) in Berlin, in 2001, as a member of the class of famous painter Georg Baselitz. In 2002, while she was still attending her basic course, the South Korean embassy commissioned SEO to design the United Buddy Bear on behalf of her native country. Together with the Governing Mayor of Berlin, Klaus Wowereit, she unveiled this Buddy Bear at the exhibition opening to launch this international art event. She finished the basic course in 2003 supplementing this by the Master Course (2003–2004) thus becoming a "Meisterschülerin“ (Master Disciple) of Baselitz. The Master Disciple is the highest degree conferred on artist by art academies in Germany. In 1999 she started exhibiting her works in Galleries and museums both in South Korea, Germany and internationally, and continues to do so.

== Works ==
Although SEO counts as an artist, her works can also be seen as mixed media images. Usually a blank canvas is used to draw a preliminary design, which is then filled out by a large number of pieces of torn rice (mulberry or tetrapanax) paper pasted onto the canvas. Some of the paper used is printed especially for her in South Korea, especially the paper with patterns designed by herself. In the next step she applies thin and (semi-) transparent layers of paint to form the final image.

First, she developed a linear style of painting, with whitish lines aiding the definition of the figures, circumscribing the virtual contour. The white lines, however, should be seen as narrow bands of pure painting, with changing hues and densities, creating a match between micro- and macro-structural elements. She embraced European culture, without giving up her Asian background, also engaging in “cultural reconstruction”, like when she reconstructs the spirit of German Romanticism in her paintings. There is also a blending of the conceptual and the ideal which leads to something entirely new, a process of “Creolization”.

In the course of her development, the linear element slowly became less prominent, while her color scheme grew all the more poignant. The reaction to everyday issues in life and politics, as well as in art and culture, led to statements about these subjects based on an aesthetic concept, which also embodies a definition of the picture as a moment taken out of the unlimited context of the eternal stream of images in the mind, pinpointing not objects, but the essence of things.

The larger part of her work is created in groups of images around a certain idea, motif or concept, like, among others, the series "My German Dreams", "Rice Fields", the "War" and the "Water lilies" series. In all groups there are very large formats, but the "Water lilies" tend to be especially monumental. In the exhibition in the Kunsthalle Rostock, "close encounter – robert rauschenberg – seo" in 2008 she showed a very large size painting with a lake and waterlilies and mountains in the background. The landscape was composed of images of really existing landscapes from different countries, making it a symbol of the world, The water lilies referred to all 47 species of water lilies, also making the rendering a symbol, besides its alluding to Monet, who was at the height of his water lily-images exactly 100 years earlier. The image consisted of more than 1 million paper scraps.

SEO's "Meine deutschen Träume" ("My German Dreams") deals with her experiences and relation with Germany. She treats and quotes Ernst Ludwig Kirchner, Caspar David Friedrich und Carl Spitzweg, and the sculptural works accompanying the paintings are cast in "German silver" (i. e. nickel silver, Argantan, alpacca) and show what for her is essentially German: beer barrels (Gemütlichkeit), garden gnomes (contemplativeness), stags’ antlers (power) and – cows. The latter stand for milk and cheese, as Europeans smell, for Asians, like milk. This is a form of cultural reconstruction, as both cultures are treated on the level of subject matter and style. Also the reconstruction of the emotional structure of a certain era embeds possibilities of new, contemporary insights.

More recently SEO has widened her range. In an exhibition, "Personal Structures" at Palazzo Bembo, within the framework of the 2011 Venice Biennale, SEO showed an installation of four of her concentric abstract "Energy" paintings in a dialogue with a box lit from the bottom with assorted rock crystals (German diamonds). She has also started to work with photography as one of her artistic media. A series of her photographs of a light bulb was published in the "art.es" magazine #47. Her main gallery contact is Michael Schultz Gallery, Berlin (D), Beijing (PRC), Seoul (RK).

== Solo exhibitions ==
- 1999 Galerie Mudeung, Gwangju / Korea
- 2003 silence and exchange by the mountain, Galeria Simbolo, Oporto / Portugal
- 2003 Meine deutschen Träume, Galerie Michael Schultz, Berlin
- 2004 The Return of the Fishermen to Paradise, Thomas von Lintel Gallery, New York / U.S.A.
- 2005 Bergphilosophen, Galería Carmen de la Calle, Madrid / Spain
- 2005 Falkenrot Preis 2005, Künstlerhaus Bethanien, Berlin
- 2006 Ricefields, Thomas von Lintel Gallery, New York / U.S.A.
- 2007 Am Ende kam der Tag, Kunsthalle Mannheim, Mannheim
- 2007 Between dreams, Hyundai Gallery, Seoul / Korea
- 2008 close encounter. Robert Rauschenberg und SEO, Kunsthalle Rostock, Rostock
- 2009 Der Fluß findet das Meer, Kunsthalle Dresden, Dresden
- 2010 Without Words, Today Art Museum, Beijing / China
- 2011 Mondlandung, Leo Koenig Projects, New York / U.S.A.
- 2011 Parallel World, Galerie Andreas Binder, München< Germany
- 2012 In Dog We Trust, Galerie Michael Janssen, Berlin
- 2013 Fremd in der eigenen Haut, BAP-Gallerie, Istanbul / Türkei
- 2014 Global Things – The long way back, Wetterling Gallery, Stockholm / Sweden
- 2015 Die Teilung der Unendlichkeit, Galerie Michael Schultz, Berlin, Germany
- 2015 Lost and Found, Spazio Punch Venedig, Italy
- 2016 Die Verdoppelung der Wirklichkeit, Wetterling Gallery, Stockholm, Sweden
- 2017 Das Gefühl in meinem Innern, Rosenhang Museum, Weilburg/Lahn
- 2018 Verwunschene Realität, Galeria 111, Lissabon/Portugal
- 2019 Multiverse, Galerie Michael Schultz, Berlin/Germany
- 2020 Seeing the World through, Gallery Wetterling, Stockholm/Sweden

== Awards & Stipends ==
- 2000 Stipendium der Cho-sun Universität als beste Studentin
- 2004 Walter-Hellenthal-Preis für Malerei, Berlin
- 2004 Meisterschülerpreis des Präsidenten der Universität der Künste, Berlin
- 2005 Blickachsen Förderpreis, Bad Homburg Falkenrot Preis, Berlin
- 2005 Award of Excellent Painting, National Art Museum of China, Beijing / China
- 2008 Meilenstein, Düren
- 2010 Beijing Art Award

== Publications ==
- SEO: Personal Cosmos, Munich, Hirmer Verlag 2011. ISBN 978-3-7774-4111-5
- SEO: Without Words, Beijing, Today Art Museum 2010.
- SEO: War and Peace in the 21st Century, Gwangju, Gwangju Museum of Art 2010.
- Christoph Tannert: SEO, Munich, Prestel Verlag 2009. ISBN 978-3-7913-4368-6
- SEO: Der Fluss findet das Meer, Dresden, Kunsthalle Dresden 2009.
- SEO, a. o.: Constellations, Beijing 798, Biennale 2009.
- SEO, a. o.: The Judith Rothschild Foundation Contemporary Drawings Collection, Museum of Modern Art, New York 2009. ISBN 978-0-87070-751-3
- SEO: the cologne paintings, Berlin, Leopold-Hoesch-Museum 2008.
- SEO: Close encounter. Robert Rauschenberg und SEO, Berlin, Kunsthalle Rostock 2008.
- SEO: Am Ende kam der Tag, Mannheim, Kunsthalle Mannheim 2007. ISBN 3-939983-04-7
- SEO, a. o.: German Painting, London, Marlborough Fine Art 2007.
- SEO: Falkenrot Preis 2005, Berlin, Künstlerhaus Bethanien 2005.
