= Arif Aziz =

Azerbaijani artist

- Born: 3 January 1943 (age 83); Baku, Azerbaijan
- Education: Azerbaijan State University of Culture and Art
- Occupation: Actor
- Years active: 1998–present
- Spouse: Farida Azizova (m. 1988)
- Children: 3

Arif Aziz (or: Ариф Азиз; born 3 January 1943 in Baku; with full name: Aziz Arif Mokhubali / Азиз Ариф Мохубали) is an artist from Azerbaijan, living and teaching in its capital, Baku. He is one of Azerbaijan's internationally known contemporary artists and serves as his country's Ambassador for Peace, People's Artist of Azerbaijan Republic and Professor at Azerbaijani State University of Art and Culture.

== Life ==
Arif Aziz was born in Baku in 1943, where he lives and works. He studied at first, between 1957 and 1962, at the Azerbaijan State University of Culture and Art. He then studied graphic design in Moscow for five years. Since the early 1970s, he teaches fine arts at the country's art schools. In 2005, he took the chair of painting at Beykent University in Istanbul, Turkey, which he held until 2007. After that, he became Dean of the Azerbaijan State University of Culture and Art.

Arif Aziz is married to Farida Azizova. They have three daughters. Aysel Aziz, Ayan Aziz Mammadova and Aylal Heydarova.

== Works ==
When Aziz initially began painting he had to follow the teachings of socialist realism, which required that he paint glorified depictions of communist values. Despite this restriction he found a way to go around the restrictions of Soviet times and painted attractions, cities, and landscapes of his homeland in a figurative art style. In his art Aziz also combines the human face with traditional ornaments from his homeland, as well as influences gathered during travels to Africa, Moscow, Paris, Turkey and India.

Aziz is credited as helping to shape a school of abstractionism that has impacted many young Azerbaijanian artists.

== Collections and public exhibitions ==
=== Public collections ===
Works by Arif Aziz can be found in the following collections:

- Azerbaijan Carpet Museum in Baku
- Baku Museum of Modern Art
- Moscow Museum of Modern Art
- Senegal State Art Museum in Dakar

=== Exhibitions (selected) ===
The following are selected exhibits where Aziz' work has been displayed as either a solo work or as part of a main group exhibition.

- solo show: Dance of Spirit, Galerie Michael Schultz, Berlin 2015
- solo show: RTR Gallery, Paris 2013
- group show: Central House of Artists, Moscow 2011

== Bibliography ==
- Arif Aziz: Dance of Spirit, (exhibition catalogue, edd. by Kunsthalle Messmer, Galerie Michael Schultz, Kunsthalle Dresden), Berlin 2015
- Arsalan Mohammed und Hans Bussert, From Baku to Berlin, in: SLEEK – THE VISUAL CONTEMPORARY, Spring 2015, Berlin 2015, pp. 84–91
