= Umberto Mariani =

Italian artist and painter (born 1936)

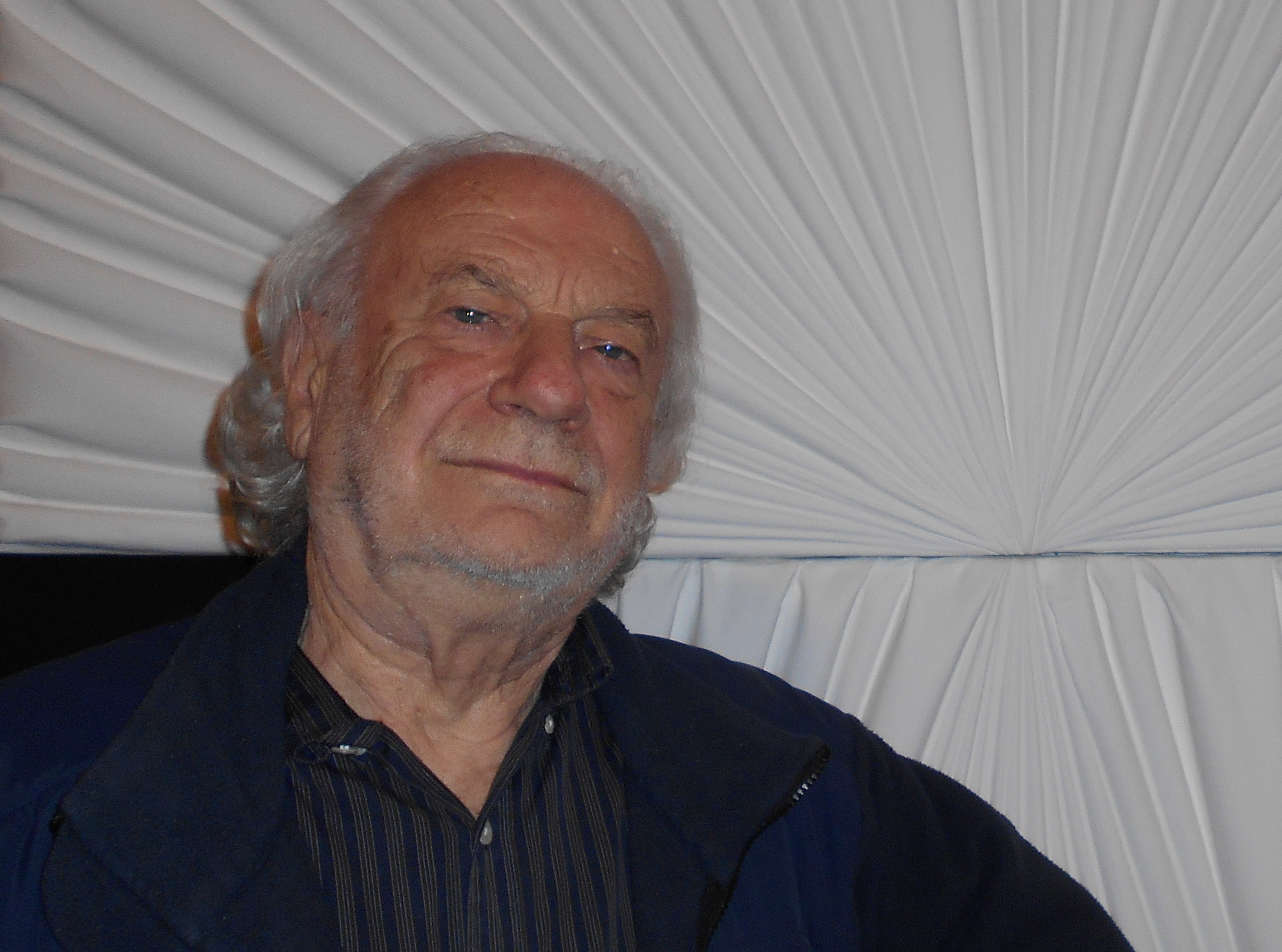
- The artist Umberto Mariani
- Born: 16 November 1936; Milan, Italy
- Known for: Painting

Umberto Mariani (Milan, 16 November 1936) is an Italian artist and painter.

== Biography ==
Son of Ugo and Jole Nizzoli, accounting clerks who represent the typical petty bourgeoisie between the two world wars, Umberto Mariani grew up within a family environment that was however permeated by strong ideals. This is highlighted by his father's active participation in the anti-fascist struggle. In 1943-1944, their home in Milan served as a refuge for groups of persecuted Jews, protected and helped by the clandestine organization headed by Fernanda Wittgens. The experience of war leaves significant marks on the very young Mariani's spirit. He completes his artistic studies, first at the Liceo Artistico and then, in the same historical building, from 1954 to 1958 at the Accademia di Brera, in the school of Achille Funi, where he becomes his assistant. In the years between 1959 and 1965, he closely collaborated with his master in the realization of numerous, magnificent decorative frescoes. He also collaborates on the altarpiece of San Giuseppe in the Basilica of San Pietro in Rome (central altar in the left transept). Through these experiences he acquires the skill to work on a large scale, a skill he will use in the years to follow.

== I Piombi ==
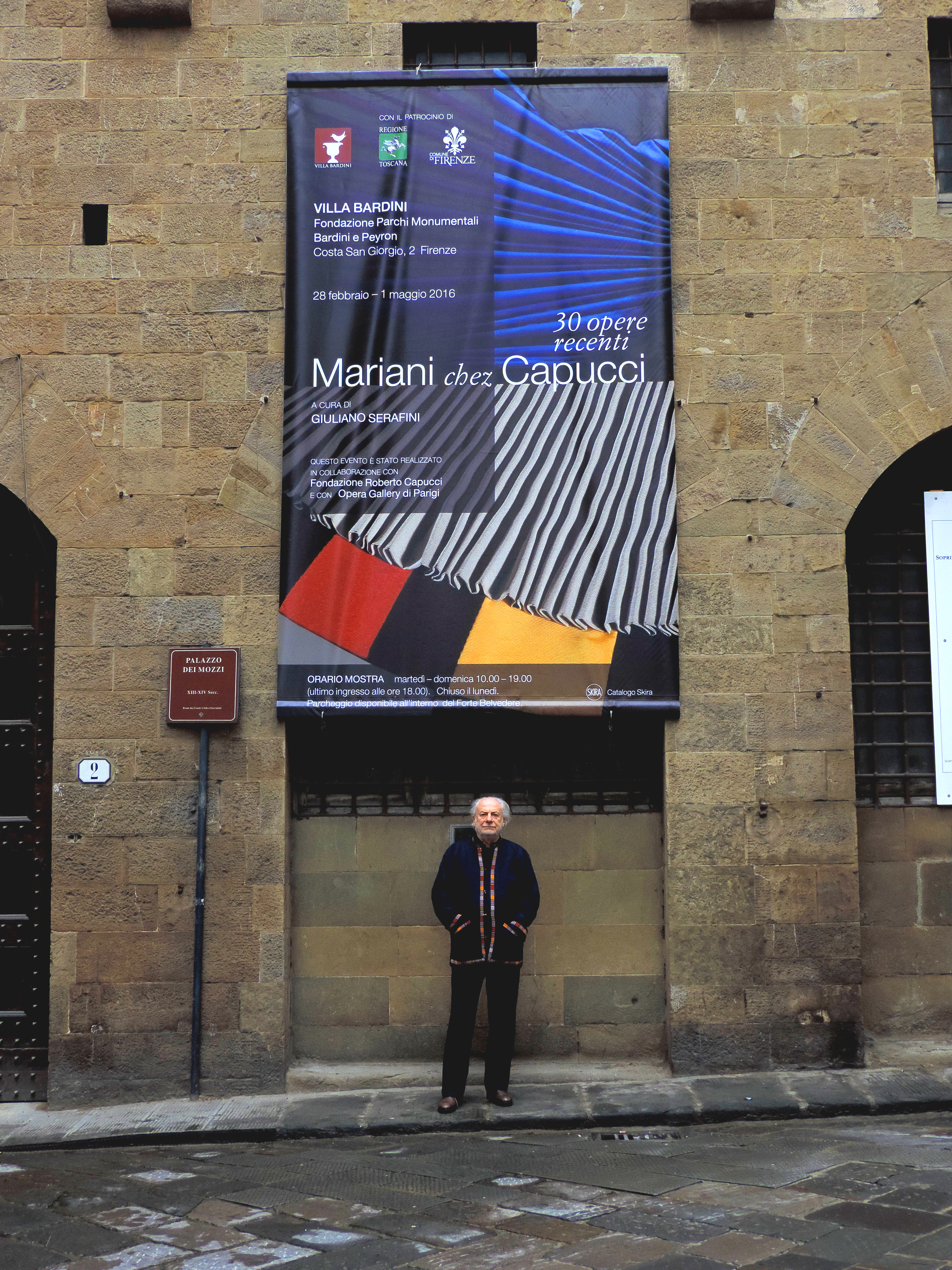
The exhibition in Florence Mariani chez Capucci

From 1990, Mariani begins to work from the subject of drapery that he is passionate about, and creates in his works known as I Piombi a stylized and geometrized idea of this subject matter. The drapery loses all true form, and the works crystallize in straight lines that look to affirm a more idealistic, symbolic vision. He participated in the XIII Rome Quadriennale (1998-1999) and in the XIV Rome Quadriennale (2003-2004). In 2011, the exhibition Le Vesti di Saturno is held in the prestigious halls of the Medici Gallery in Palazzo Medici-Riccardi in Florence. The solo exhibition entitled Recent Works-Piombi followed in 2013 in the Baroque spaces of the Sala San Ignazio in Arezzo and later that year, the anthological exhibition Umberto Mariani-Opere 1967-2013 (catalogue edited by Allemandi) takes place in the Chiostri di San Domenico in Reggio Emilia. Opera Gallery, present with twelves offices located over 5 continents, sign an exclusive contract to organize shows of Mariani's work in Paris, New York and Hong-Kong. The art fairs in Reggio Emilia and Parma show personal exhibitions in 2014 and 2015 respectively and in 2015 a major environmental work entitled Plutone and Dioniso-Omaggi a Dag Hammarskjoeld, a eulogy to peace, is exhibited in the Museum of Wall Paintings in Prato.

In 2016 the solo show entitled Mariani chez Capucci takes place at the Capucci Foundation located in Villa Bardini in Florence.

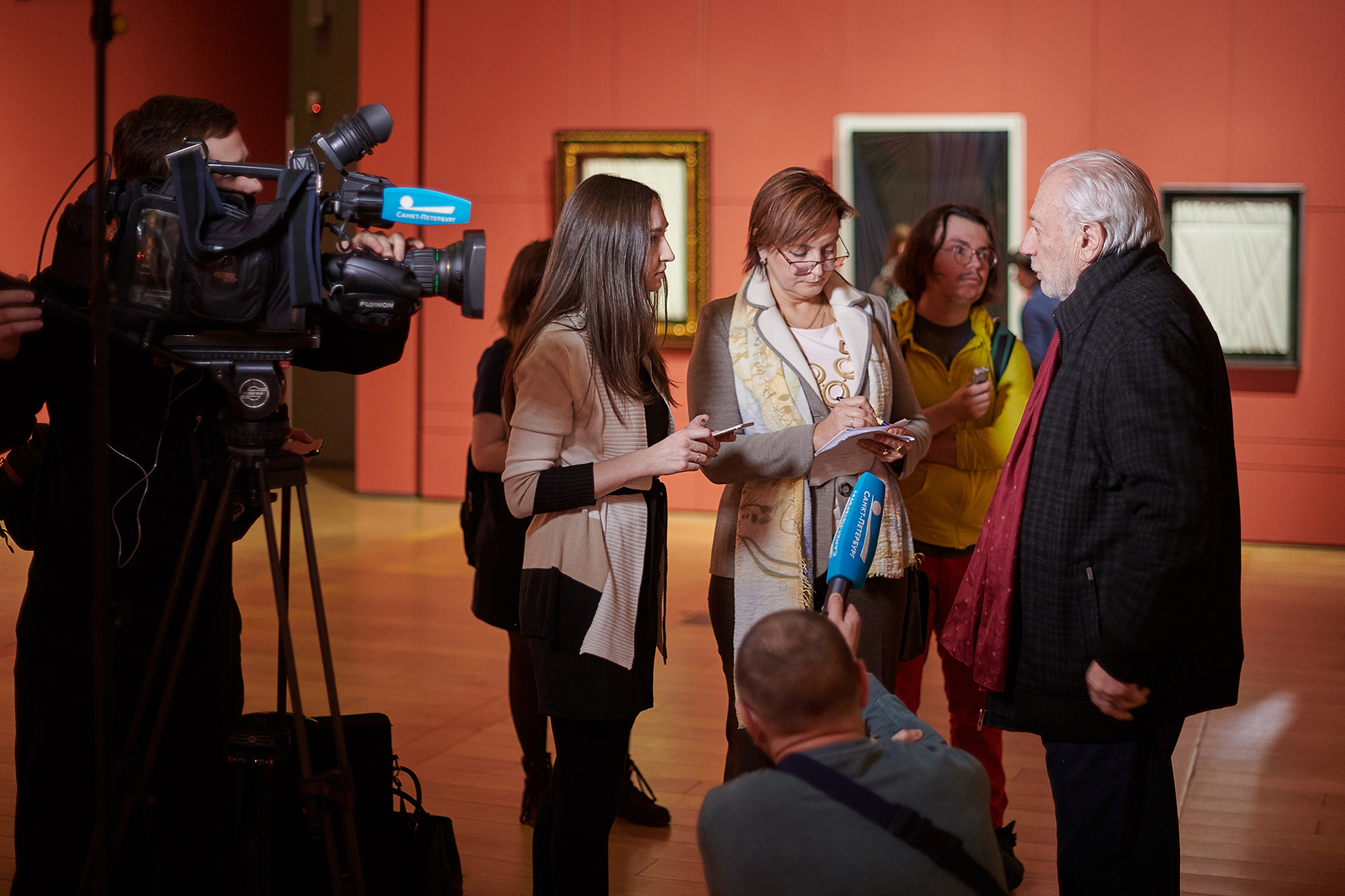
Exhibition at the Hermitage in St. Petersburg

In November and December 2016, an anthological exhibition is organized at the Mudima Foundation in Milan with 50 works ranging from 1967 to 2016. In Spring 2017, another personal exhibition is held at the Opera Gallery in Paris, entitled Umberto Mariani e le Monochrome Italien. The exhibition Arte ribelle - 1960/1970 - Artisti del ‘68 takes place in the exhibition halls of the bank Credito Valtellinese in Milan with three large works by the master. The exhibition then moved to Fano at the Galleria Carifano later that year. 2018 - 2019 Three major museums host the solo travelling exhibition Frammenti da Bisanzio: the National Museum of Ravenna, followed by the Museums of San Salvatore in Lauro in Rome and finally at the State Hermitage Museum in St. Petersburg, in the Palace of the General Staff.

At the beginning of 2019, the artist was awarded by the Centro Studi Grande Milano at Palazzo Isimbardi, the Grandi Guglie honor, for his role as an ambassador of Milanese culture in the world.

2020 at Gallerie d'Italia, Milan, solo exhibition Umberto Mariani. Frammenti da Bisanzio (atto terzo)

2024 at Basilica Palladiana, Vicenza, historical artworks in the exhibition POP/BEAT-Italia 1960-1979 – Liberi di sognare
