= Amador Lugo Guadarrama =

Mexican painter and writer (1921–2002)

Amador Lugo Guadarrama (April 12, 1921 – June 26, 2002) was a Mexican painter, graphic artist, writer and cultural promoter, best known for his landscape painting and the founding of several cultural institutions. He began painting when still a child, attending the Escuela al Aire Libre de Pintura in Taxco then developing his career in Mexico City. At that time, the Mexican muralism school was still dominant. Lugo related to its aesthetics but not so much to its politics, so he participated in the founding of various institutions such as the Sociedad Mexicana de Grabadores and the Salón de la Plástica Mexicana which provided opportunities for artists outside the dominant movement. He also worked as an educator, writer and cultural promoter, mostly in Mexico City and his home state of Guerrero.

== Life ==
Amador Lugo Guadarrama was born in the village of Santa Rosa, located in the municipality of Taxco in Guerrero, Mexico to Carlos Lugo Hernández and María Guadarrama Viveros. The area was rural with the village about ten kilometers from the town proper. Lugo stated in an interview that there was almost nothing in the village educationally or culturally, only attending primary school there.

In the early 1930s, he went to Taxco to live after his second year of primary school. There he found a much larger world with ideas and knowledge that did not exist in his village, even though at the time Taxco had only 5,000 residents. Taxco also gave him his first contact with painting at the Escuela al Aire Libre de Pintura, run by Japanese artist Tamaji Kitagawa. This school was a satellite school promoted from Mexico City into the provinces. The school's purpose was to break from the rigidity of the traditional academies, and to promote more art for the masses. In 1934, he had his first exhibition sponsored by the school which took place in Mexico City.

In the late 1930s, Kitagawa returned to Mexico City and the school's focus changed along with its leadership. These changes did not agree with Lugo. A friend suggested that he also move to Mexico City, promising to help him make contacts. Lugo arrived to the city in 1942 with only thirty pesos and a contact with gallery owner Inés Amor. She eventually helped him to get work at the Escuela de Pintura al Aire Libre in Mexico City to make ends meet.

In 1942, he entered the Escuela Nacional de Artes del Libro, to study engraving with Carlos Alvarado Lang . In 1943, he entered the Escuela Normal Superior to become certified as an art teacher. From 1943 to 1945, he also studied clay sculpture at the Academy of San Carlos .

He had a career as a cultural promoter and writer even though he was to a certain extent quiet and reserved, speaking little socially. In 1952, he married María de los Angeles Trejo.

During his life he traveled, first to Guatemala, Honduras and Peru in 1964, then to Europe (France, Italy, England, Switzerland, Germany and Spain) in 1979 and then to Cuba in 1980. In 1983, he was invited by the Japan Foundation to visit various cities in Japan.

Near the end of his life, he donated a large number of his works to his home state, many of which depicted scenes from that area. Amador Lugo died in Mexico City on June 26, 2002 at the age of 81.

== Career ==
Amador Lugo became one of the few students at the Escuela de Aire Libre de Pintura in Taxco to work as an artist professionally, with a career that spanned over 65 years. Although is best known as a landscape painter, was also a master engraver, as well as writer and cultural promoter.

He participated in about 350 individual and collective exhibitions in both Mexico and abroad. attracting the attention of critics such as Jorge Juan Crespo de la Serna, Enrique F. Gual, Margarita Nelken, Antonio Rodríguez, Raquel Tibol and Teresa del Conde. Most of his individual exhibitions were related to the Salón de la Plástica Mexicana including his first in 1950 and others in 1952, 1966, 1972, 1982 and 1997. Other individual exhibitions of his work include a 1972 show at the Foro de Artesanias in Taxco, and a homage held at the Galería Taxco in 1983. In 1948 the Instituto Nacional de Bellas Artes (INBA) acquired twenty one of his works and in 2008, a work called Región fantástica (1978), became part of the exhibition called La invención de lo cotidiario at MUNAL . In 1983 a Veracruz landscape won first prize from the faculty of fine arts of the Universidad Veracruzana. In 2002, shortly before his death, he participated in an event to honor the founders of the Salón de la Plástica Mexicana and in the same year after his death, the Centro Cultural Taxco-Borda held an event to honor him.

Lugo's published writings include presentations of artists, catalog descriptions, conference papers and articles in newspapers and magazines from 1959 to 1983, writing on topics such as art education, pre-Columbian art and colonial era art. His writing gave him visibility through the press and in art catalogs, participating in conferences and seminars to discuss the works of his colleagues. In 1957 he participated in the creation of the book La ciudad de México vista por cinco pintores by the Sociedad Mexicana de Grabadores. In 1976 he collaborated with photographs and drawings for the book Arte Integral Uno.

He art education career began in 1948 at the Escuela Nacional de Artes Gráficas. He also taught at the Escuela Nacional de Educadores and worked as a supervisor of art education with INBA. In 1955, he was a member of the executive committee of the Sindicato Nacional de Trabajadores en Educación, a teachers’ union.

When Lugo arrived to Mexico City in the 1940s, the Mexican muralism movement with artists such as Diego Rivera, David Alfaro Siqueiros and Leopoldo Méndez dominated the art scene, closing opportunity to many younger artists, Lugo included. Lugo identified with the aesthetics of the movement but not such much its political bent. In graphics Lugo respected the dominant artists in Mexico, especially those of the Taller de Gráfica Popular but did not join. Instead, he helped to found new organization called the Sociedad Mexicana de Grabadores in 1947. This group explored topics outside politics without excluding it. He also helped to found new organizations to promote new artists such as the Sociedad para el Impulso de las Artes Plásticas (1948), the Frente Nacional de Artes Plásticas (1952) and the Salón de la Plástica Mexicana (1949). He was very active with the last organization, serving as a judge in various events and serving on the board various times, the last term being from 1976 to 1979.

His cultural promotion activities were done in his home state of Guerrero and in Mexico City. He taught classes at his home in Guerrero and participated in primary school education activities there. In 1980, he began a radio program called La hora de bellas artes sponsored by INBA. The goal was to get youth interested in music and the culture of Mexico broadcasting alternatively in Taxco and Mexico City. In 1983 he became a member of the Feria Nacional de la Plata in Guerrero to promote that state's silver smithing industry.

== Artistry ==
This aesthetic sense was set in his youth, as he learned to paint as a child from Kitigawa, whose influence remained evident in Lugo's creation through his career, especially in the depictions of nature. His early work, in which dominated scenes of everyday life such as rural markets, women with rebozos and farm workers, have a childlike quality, which also appears in some of his later work. Lugo stated in an interview that “art is the feeling and the possibility to express and idea; to express something that a human being needs to give to posterity, some that that come, in reality, from deep inside.” His work does not contain bright colors, those that impact, but rather look to depict the colors of reality. But he avoided dark colors and shadows as these depict sadness.

When Lugo began his career, the Mexican muralism school was still very dominant in the country. He identified with much of the aesthetics of the muralism school but not its politics.

Lugo's work was mostly on canvas, although he also did graphic art and even a natural stone mural for his house in Taxco with a mining theme. He is best known for his landscape paintings, mostly focusing on scenes from the Mexico City area, the town of Taxco and rural areas in Guerrero. His landscapes show influence from Eugenio Landecio, José María Velasco and Dr. Atl along with Manuel Echauri, Angelina Beloff, Luis Nishizawa and Raúl Anguiano. He began with rural scenes around his home in Taxco. In the 1940s, he began to depict scenes in the Mexico City areas, adapting what he did for landscapes of rural Guerrero to that major urban center. During this period as well his language and techniques matured, deciding that cities have their own kind of beauty; however, he never stopped painting rural areas.
