= Norbert Bisky =

German artist (born 1970)

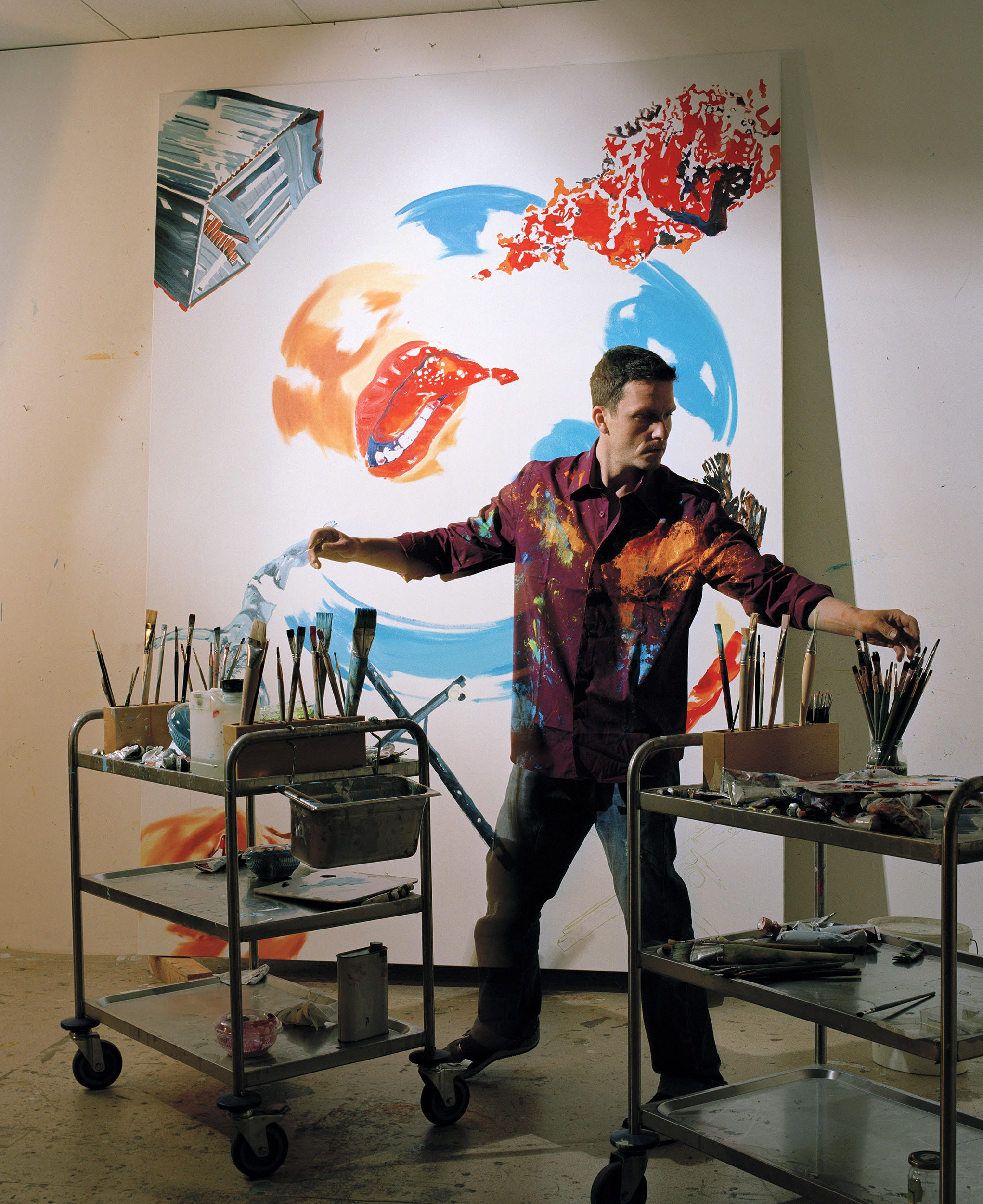
Portrait of Bisky, Berlin 2007

Norbert Bisky (born 1970) is a German artist based in Berlin. He is one of the most important representatives of a new figurative painting in the 21st century.

== Life ==
Norbert Bisky was born in Leipzig and grew up in the former German Democratic Republic as "part of a very Communist family that really believed in all that stuff".

From 1994 to 1999 Norbert Bisky studied painting at Hochschule der Künste in Berlin where he was a Master Student of Georg Baselitz and at the Salzburg Summer Academy in the class of Jim Dine.

In 1995, he spent a year as an exchange student in Madrid, where he discovered the works of Francisco de Goya, Francisco de Zubaráns and Jusepe de Ribera.

Bisky was a guest professor at the HEAD Academy of arts in Geneva from 2008 to 2010 and from 2016 to 2018 at HBK Braunschweig. In 2015, he swapped studios with Tel Aviv-based artist Erez Israeli for three months.

== Work ==
Norbert Biskys early paintings are most commonly described as heavily influenced by socialist realism, the official art of the GDR. Comparing the belief in communism to a religion, he processed his childhood memories by painting "those images of paradise" and "false promises" into dazzling bright images of idealized bodies and untouched nature.

In later years, Bisky's large-size paintings, often depicting adolescents, increasingly shifted towards darker themes. Personal loss, the experience of terror, travels to Brazil and media reports inspired him to examine subjects such as violence, sexuality and destruction symbolized by figures, in many cases floating, falling or tumbling without any gravitational axis. Firmly established in the public conscience through media images following the September 11 attacks, these falling figures explore the transience of youth, the loss of autonomy, isolation and the disintegration of modern civilization.

The aesthetic tumult surrounding the figures is punctuated by the cross pollination of cues from Christian ideology, art history, gay culture, pornography and apocalyptic visions. Through this, Bisky transmits an impression of instability on the canvas that distinctly resonates with our contemporary state of affairs.

In May 2013, Norbert Bisky created his first stage set for the piece "Masse" by the Berlin State Ballet that premiered in the legendary Berlin Nightclub Berghain in May 2013 and was the subject of a TV documentary by German director Nicole Graf.

Since May 2017 Norbert Bisky's large-format painting "Vertigo" is prominently displayed in Berghain's entrance hall as part of the club's art concept, which also features works by Wolfgang Tillmans and Joseph Marr.

For World Press Freedom Day, Norbert Bisky created the painting "Rauschen" which was printed on the title page of numerous German daily newspapers, in collaboration with the Federal association of German newspaper publishers (BDZV: Bundesverband Deutscher Zeitungsverleger) on 3 May 2019.

Bisky is being represented by Fabienne Levy Gallery in Lausanne, Switzerland. Until 2023, he was also represented by König Galerie in Berlin. Since March 2025, he is represented by Esther Schipper gallery.

== Exhibitions ==
2025

- "Polympsest", Esther Schipper Gallery, Berlin, Germany

2024

- "Passengers", Fabienne Levy Gallery, Geneva and Lausanne, Switzerland
- "Walküren", Worms City Museum, Worms, Germany
- "Ludology", Galerie Templon, New York

2023

- "Im Freien", Kunstverein Freunde Aktueller Kunst, Zwickau
- "Swing State", Navot Miller & Norbert Bisky, Weserhalle, Berlin

2022

- "UTOPIANISTAS", Galerie Daniel Templon, Paris, France
- "Taumel", König Galerie, Berlin, Germany
- "Kurpark", Cokkie Snoei Gallery, Rotterdam, Netherlands
- "Walküren-Basislager", Staatsoper Stuttgart, Stuttgart, Germany
- "Mirror Society", SCAD Museum of Art, Savannah, USA

2021

- „DISINFOTAINMENT", G2 Kunsthalle, Leipzig, Germany

2020

- "Unrest", Fabienne Levy Gallery, Lausanne, Switzerland
- "Metrocake", KONIG TOKIO, Tokio, Japan
- "Berlin Sunday", Le Confort Moderne, Poitiers, France
- "Desmadre Berlin", Galerie Daniel Templon, Paris, France

2019

- "RANT", Villa Schöningen, Potsdam, Germany / "POMPA", St. Matthäus-Kirche, Berlin, Germany
- "Tainted Love/Club Edit", Villa Arson, Nizza, France

2018

- "Fernwärme", Museum Langmatt, Baden, Switzerland
- "Hope and Hazard: A Comedy of Eros", curated by Eric Fischl, Hall Art Foundation, Reading, USA
- "Boezemvriend" (with Grit Hachmeister), Cokkie Snoei Gallery, Rotterdam, Netherlands

2017

- "Trilemma", König Galerie, Berlin, Germany
- "Die Revolution ist tot. Lang lebe die Revolution!", Kunstmuseum Bern, Bern, Switzerland
- "MISSING: Der Turm der blauen Pferde by Franz Marc – Contemporary artists in search of a lost masterpiece", Haus am Waldsee, Berlin, Germany

2016

- "Dies Irae", Crone Wien, Vienna, Austria
- "A FUGA", Galeria Baró, São Paulo, Brazil
- "Elective Affinities – German Art Since The Late 1960s", Latvian National Museum of Art, Riga, Latvia
- "Zeitgeist – Arte da Nova Berlim", Centro Cultural Banco do Brasil, Rio de Janeiro, Brazil

2015

- "Hérésie", Galerie Daniel Templon, Brussels, Belgium
- "Levinsky Street", Givon Art Gallery, Tel Aviv, Israel
- "Balagan", Bötzow Berlin, Berlin, Germany
- "Black Bandits", Haus am Lützowplatz, Berlin, Germany

2014

- "Zentrifuge", Kunsthalle Rostock, Rostock, Germany
- "Works on Paper", Galerie Daniel Templon, Paris, France
- "Riots", Galería Espacio Mínimo, Madrid, Spain
- "10", Berghain, Berlin, Germany
- "Utopie Picturale 2", Fonderie Kugler, Geneva, Switzerland

2013

- "Norbert Bisky: Special Report", MEWO Kunsthalle, Memmingen, Germany
- "Paraisópolis", Galerie Crone, Berlin, Germany

2012

- "Stampede", Leo Koenig Inc., New York, USA
- "I am a Berliner", Tel Aviv Museum of Art, Tel Aviv, Israel
- "Laboratories of the Senses", MARTa Herford, Herford, Germany

2011

- "A Retrospective. Ten Years of Painting", Kunsthalle Marcel Duchamp, Cully, Switzerland
- "Decompression", Galerie Daniel Templon, Paris, France

2010

- "befall", Galerie Crone, Berlin, Germany
- "Maudit", Galerie Charlotte Moser, Geneva, Switzerland

2009

- "Mandelkern", Kunstverein Dortmund, Dortmund, Germany
- "crossing jordaan", Cokkie Snoei, Rotterdam und Amsterdam, Netherlands
- "Nefasto Máximo", Galería Espacio Mínimo, Madrid, Spain
- "Norbert Bisky: Paintings", Haifa Museum of Art, Haifa, Israel

2008

- "cloud cuckoo land", Gallery Mirchandani + Steinruecke, Mumbai, India
- "privat", Galerie Crone, Berlin, Germany
- "minimental", Cokkie Snoei Gallery, Rotterdam

2007

- "Ich war's nicht", Haus am Waldsee, Berlin, Germany
- "What's wrong with me", Leo Koenig Inc., New York, USA
- "Behind Innocence", Gallery Hyundai, Seoul, South Korea

2006

- "Total Care", Contemporary Art Center, Vilnius, Lithuania
- "es tut mir so leid", Galerie Michael Schultz, Berlin, Germany

2005

- "Norbert Bisky", Studio d'Arte Cannaviello, Milan, Italy
- "Déluge", Galerie Suzanne Tarasiève, Paris, France
- "Malerei", Künstlerhaus Bethanien, Berlin, Germany

2004

- "The Proud, the Few", Leo Koenig Inc., New York, USA
- "Abgesagt", Mannheimer Kunstverein, Mannheim, Germany
- "Opkomst en Verval", Cokkie Snoei Gallery, Rotterdam, Netherlands

2003

- "Schlachteplatte", Galerie Michael Schultz, Berlin, Germany

2002

- "Norbert Bisky", Museum Junge Kunst, Frankfurt/Oder, Germany

2001

- "Wir werden siegen", Galerie Michael Schultz, Berlin, Germany
- "Almauftrieb", Kulturbrauerei Prenzlauer Berg, Berlin, Germany
- "Vorkämpfer", Chelsea Kunstraum, Cologne, Germany

== Public collections ==
- Hall Art Foundation
- MoMA
- Palm Springs Art Museum
- National Museum of Contemporary Art, Gwacheon, South Korea
- Israel Museum, Jerusalem
- Fonds National d'Art Contemporain, Paris, France
- Vanhaerents Art Collection, Brussels, Belgium
- Hamburger Bahnhof - Nationalgalerie der Gegenwart, Berlin, Germany
- Berlinische Galerie, Berlin, Germany
- Städelsches Kunstinstitut, Frankfurt, Germany
- Deutsche Bank Collection, Frankfurt, Germany
- G2 Kunsthalle, Leipzig, Germany
- Kunsthalle Rostock
- Museum der bildenden Künste, Leipzig, Germany
- Brandenburgisches Landesmuseum für moderne Kunst, Frankfurt/Oder, Germany
- Museum Ludwig, Cologne, Germany
- Stiftung Kunstforum der Berliner Volksbank, Berlin, Germany
- Staatliche Kunsthalle Karlsruhe, Karlsruhe, Germany
- Staatsgalerie Stuttgart, Stuttgart, Germany
- Schlossmuseum Murnau, Murnau am Staffelsee, Germany
- The MER Collection, Segovia, Spain

== See also ==
- List of German painters

== Sources ==
- Mullins, Charlotte (2006). Painting People: Figure Painting Today. New York: Distributed Art Publishers. ISBN 978-1-933045-38-2
