= Robert Janitz =

German painter

Robert Janitz (born 1962) is a German-born painter working in New York City and Mexico City. He is known for his large abstract paintings that employ oil in combination with wax and flour, on a monochrome background.

In addition to New York, he has had solo exhibitions in Paris, Berlin, Brussels, London, Los Angeles, Seoul, Mexico City, Istanbul and Providence, Rhode Island, and, among other cities in France, at the Domaine de Kerguehennec, Saint Etienne and Valenciennes. He has participated in group exhibitions at Kunstmuseum Winterthur, Switzerland, the Emily Harvey Foundation in New York, the Magazzino d'Arte Moderna in Rome, the Collezione Maramotti in Reggio Emilia, Italy, and in Luxembourg, London, Paris, Buenos Aires, and Miami. Janitz's work has been reviewed in the New York Times, Die Welt, the New Yorker, and Artforum, among other places.

His works are part of the permanent collections of the Musée d'Art Moderne de Paris, France; San Francisco Museum of Modern Art, San Francisco, USA; Amorepacific Museum of Art , Seoul, South Korea; the Collezione Maramotti in Reggio Emilia; Hall Art Foundation, Reading, VT, USA.

He is represented by KÖNIG GALERIE, Berlin, Seoul, SAENGER GALERIA, Mexico City and SEVIL DOLMACİ, Istanbul, Dubai.

== Background / education ==
He was born in Alsfeld, in Hesse, Germany, and studied Sanskrit, art history, and comparative religions at University of Marburg in Marburg, Hesse. He holds an MA in Sanskrit. He also studied papermaking under artist Katharina Eitel in Marburg for two years, from 1991 to 1992.

== Early career and teaching ==
He lived and worked in France from 1994 to 2008, serving as a lecturer in Visual Arts at University of Paris VIII. He had his first solo show in Paris in 1996 at the Galerie Elizabeth Valleix: "Huiles sur toile” was an exhibition of small figurative paintings.

In 2009, Janitz taught at the Ecole Superieure Beaux Arts in Cherbourg, France. Having felt confined by the prevailing ideas about painting in the country, however, he moved to New York in 2009.

== Work ==
Janitz is currently known for his large abstractions that employ oil in combination with wax and flour, on a monochrome background, linen. Author of Thames & Hudson's Painting Now Suzanne Hudson writes that his strokes "evoke the repetitive actions involved in window washing, spackling, or grouting." Janitz also compared the surface in one group in this series to the buttering of bread. He works with inexpensive brushes bought at the hardware store, which he likes for being "very workmanlike" and preventing a certain level of pictorialism, allowing his work to "just stay painted." Will Heinrich of the Observer, describes the six canvases in Janitz's first solo show at Team Galley as "hung edge to edge like successive states of a single etching. But that's also the best way to highlight subtle variations." He also wrote the painter does "real work" on his surfaces at a time where he feels there is "an epidemic of protective coloration."

The artist's next series of abstractions depict the backs of people's heads. He told the artblog Painter's Bread "You can think of it as a third person narrative in literature or a Brechtian distantiation as the ultimate position of the Dandy." In the action of painting this series, he also said that he imagines a real person in the painting. TimeOut New York's Howard Halle described the activity on the 25 x 20-inch panels as "broad, gestural knots." The Art Market Monitor picked the show among the three it recommended the first week of October 2015, writing "Janitz plays and subverts the idea of codes, social codes that determine how we should approach one another, as well as painterly codes, that regulate the classifications of portraiture." Hudson for Artforum noted the deconstructive activity in this work and of the eerie overall effect of taking in the exhibition: "Standing amid a room full of eyeless totems is an oddly disconcerting experience, one that, for me anyhow, gave rise to the fantasy that they were gazing into a void."

Janitz's plant sculptures emerged from including an actual plant in an exhibition in Brussels. He had been looking for a practice akin to painting, and made a model for an exhibition in New York and ended up liking the model itself. The metal sculptures are oversized, and recall the fountains he saw during his time in Paris.

In his 2017 series of paintings, unveiled at Team gallery's Los Angeles space, Janitz broke away from his usual monochrome background and used a different palette of bright pastels and neons—still made with oil, wax, and flour—inspired by the city's man-made landscapes. The work exhibits the artist's interest in inorganic life for the series, how super hot plasma turns cosmic dust particles to act lifelike. The curtain-like forms also belie strokes that the artist allowed to converge inwards rather than squaring off at the canvas' edge as before.

In addition, Janitz made an accompanying audio piece for the exhibition, a chiming noise triggered by a motion detector upon one's entry into the gallery. The sound is taken from the 1972 BBC documentary short, Reyner Banham Loves Los Angeles, in the segments signaling the narrative of the "Baede-Kar," the British architectural historian's conceit in the film of his L.A. car acting as a Baedeker German travel guide.

== Books ==
- Robert Janitz at Anahuacalli (monograph), Kettler Verlag, Dortmund, 2024 ISBN 978-3987410901
- Robert Janitz Made in New York (monograph), Distanz Verlag, Berlin, 2020 ISBN 978-3-95476-331-3
- Ed. Konrad Bitterli, Andrea Lutz, Lynn Kost, Frozen Gesture, Hirmer-Verlag, München, 2019 ISBN 978-3-7774-3269-4
- Nickas, Bob, Geometria figurativa, Figurative Geometry, Silvana Editoriale, 2017. ISBN 88-366-3680-2.
- Hudson, Suzanne, Painting Now, Thames & Hudson, 2015.
- Ex Libris (monograph), Rainoff, 2014. ISBN 978-0-9806516-9-0.
- Agboton-Jumeau, Jean-Charles and Cyroulnik, Philippe, Robert Janitz (monograph), Le 10 Neuf, 2006. ISBN 978-2-35075-023-1.

== Other work / personal life ==
He acted in New York artists Erik Moskowitz + Amanda Trager's videos, Cloud Cuckoo Land (2008) and Two Russians in the Free World (2013–14), which have been shown internationally. He has been studying Buddhism with Chögyam Trungpa and Zen archery with Kanjuro Shibata in the US, France, and Germany since 1982.
