= Andy Denzler =

Swiss artist (born 1965)

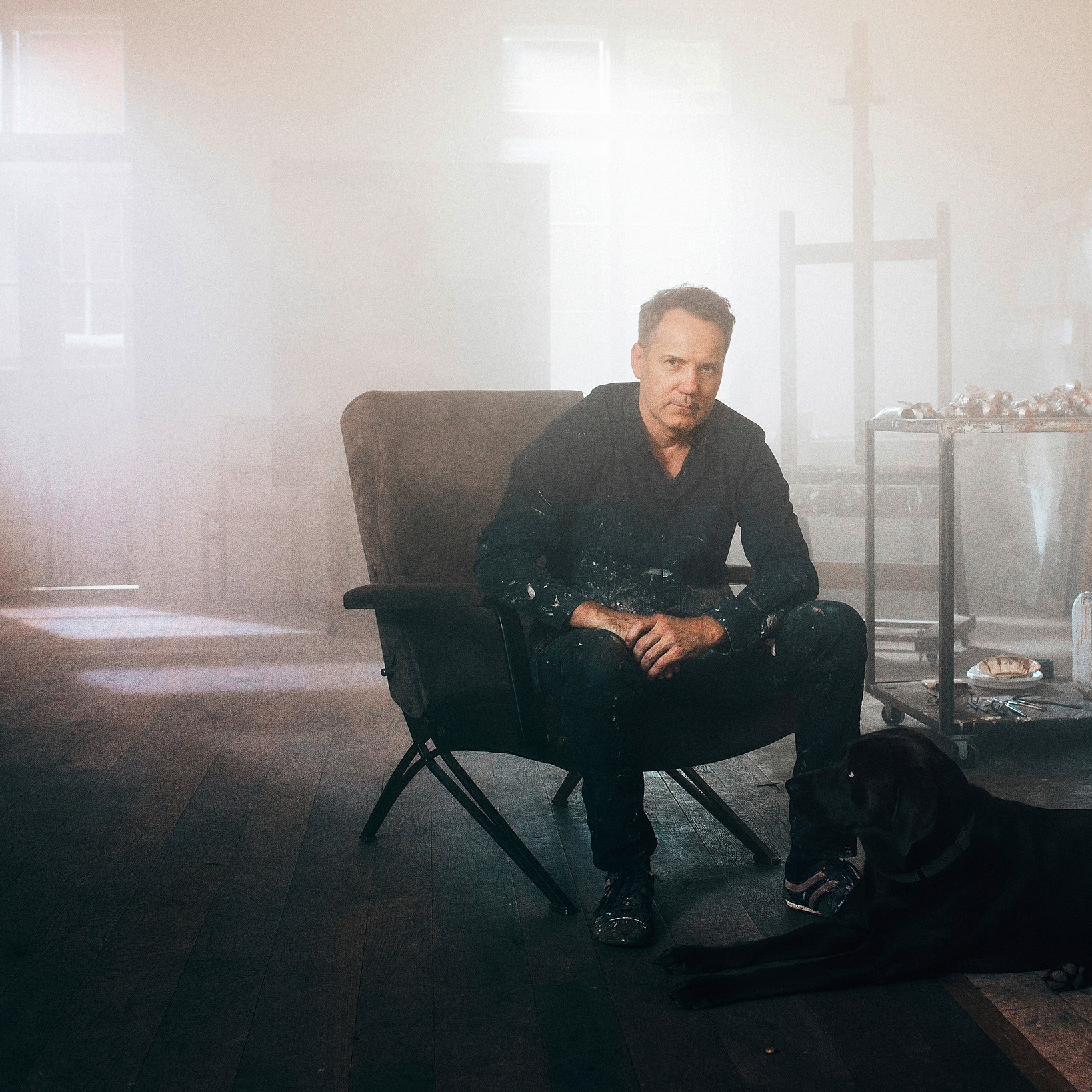
Denzler in his studio, portrait photo: Lukas Mäder

Andy Denzler (born 3 August 1965) is a Swiss artist. His distinctive technique of distorting the freshly applied surface of his paintings has shaped his entire oeuvre in painting, printmaking, sculpture and drawing.

== Life and works ==
Denzler was born in Zurich. He trained at the Kunstgewerbeschule and the F+F Schule für Gestaltung in Zurich, both schools of applied arts, as well as at the University of California, Los Angeles, and the Art Center College of Design, Pasadena. In 2006, he graduated as Master of Fine Arts from London's Chelsea College of Art and Design. Denzler lives and works in Zurich.

Denzler's works are shown in solo and group exhibitions in international galleries and museums, in Europe, America, Asia and, since 2010, also in Russia. His works can be found at the Denver Art Museum, the Musée d'art contemporain de Montreal, Canada, the David Roberts Art Foundation, London, the Tel Aviv Museum of Modern Art in Israel, the Moscow Museum of Modern Art, the White House in Washington DC, at the Museum Würth at Schwäbisch Hall in Germany, at the Burger Collection Hong Kong, the White Cube Collection, London, the KunstWerk – Sammlung Klein in Eberdingen/Stuttgart and at the Kunsthalle Rostock, Germany.

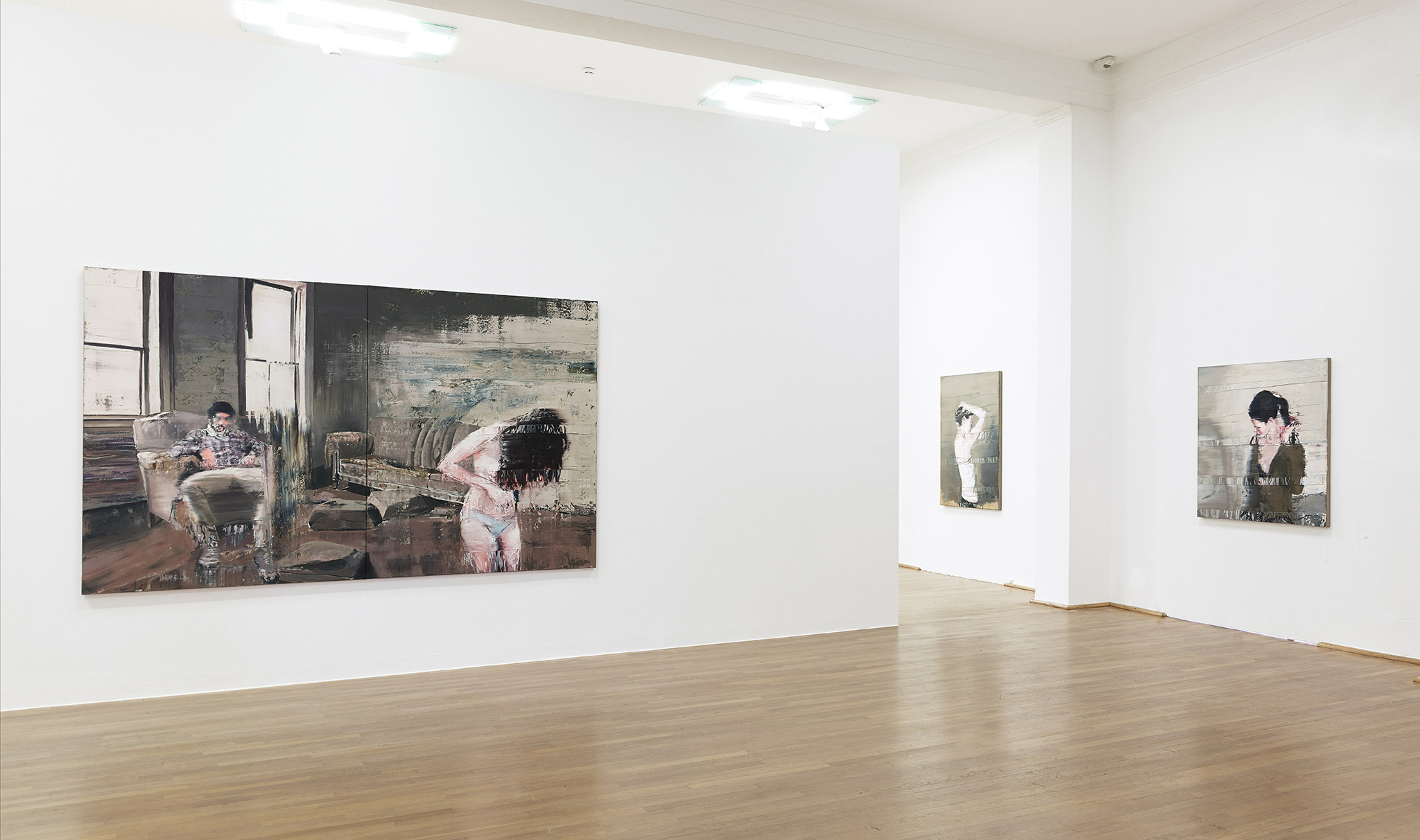
Installation View of Denzler's solo exhibition at Ludwigmuseum Koblenz, Germany

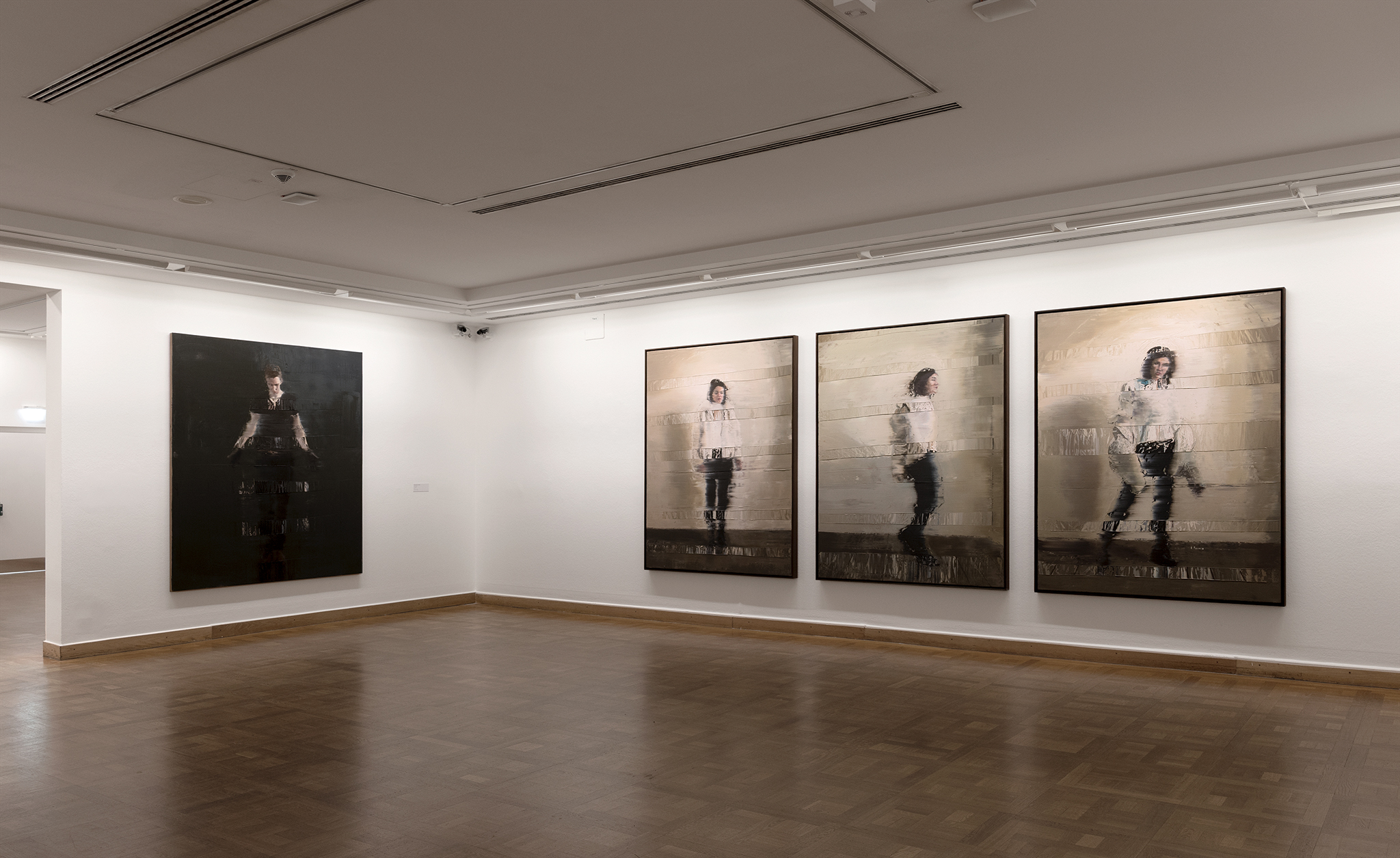
Installation View of Denzler's solo exhibition at Kunstforum Wien, Vienna, 2018

"I bring time and motion into the imagery, by using both time and motion. It’s an alla prima technique, painting wet-on-wet; I control the speed of the painting process, because there is a limited amount of time before the canvas dries". Through the streaks of the blurred image surface, Denzler's paintings appear as if the time on them has momentarily stopped. Denzler's works move between abstraction and reality. With the classic means of oil painting, the artist endeavors to fathom the borderlines between fiction and reality. Through his mostly horizontal use of a squeegee for blurring the oil paint, which he previously applies to the canvas in heavy impasto and thick layers, he achieves the impression of the object's motion blur or the notion of a distorted, faltering video recording. Time freezes. The paintings are snap-shots of events that take place, blurred, distorted movements, Freeze Frames that stylistically move between Photorealism and Abstract Expressionism. In his paintings Denzler frequently alludes to our life in a disruptive age of lens based images.

== Reception ==
The distorted photo-like quality of Denzler's paintings provides an alternative to our often ignored reality. Intent on pushing the boundaries between abstract art and photorealism, the artist captures the realism of the everyday, creating a unique moment on canvas. (Reality Glitch, Schön! Magazine, November 2019)

But unlike many contemporary painters, Denzler doesn't reproduce the photographic image onto a canvas to create a template for his work. Instead, he paints freehand, using the photograph as a reference, and building up layer upon layer of wet paint. Then, when he has a 'perfect painting', he deconstructs it, leaving in its wake traces of what was. The vestigial image, boldly striped with horizontal scrapes made by a spatula dragged across the canvas, has the effect of a video that has been permanently put on pause, giving the viewer a sense that something came before, and something will come after. But what remains in the present is a single transient, but captive, moment. (Creative Boom, 14 June 2017 by Katy Kowan)

"Denzler's new paintings unite the precision and nostalgia of realism with the bold dynamism and pulsating energy of gestural abstraction. Creating mysterious, eerie and sometimes uncomfortable moments, the artist invites the viewer into his private, voyeuristic world. Known for his signature style of thick horizontal bands of pigment traversing the canvas in thick choppy abstract strips – staccato points that add visual energy and suggest details lost in the fog of memory, time and space." (Wall Street International Magazine/Arts, 24 January 2014)

Denzler analyses the medium, the ideational and representational possibilities inherent in present-day painting with dedication and enthusiasm. He has thereby secured himself an important and individual position on the international art scene. (Tages-Anzeiger, 24 August 2008, translated from German)

== Exhibitions (selection) ==
Biennials

2016

- Not New Now, Marrakech Biennale 6, Marrakech
- Memory and Dream, 6th Beijing International Art Biennale, Beijing

Solo exhibitions

2023

- Spectral Paintings, Galerie Peter Kilchmann, Zurich

2019

- Paintings of Disruption, Opera Gallery, Seoul
- Introspection, Opera Gallery, New York

2018

- Human Perspectives, Opera Gallery, Zurich
- The Dark Corner of the Human Mind, Kunstforum Wien, Vienna
- The Painter's Room, Opera Gallery, Paris

2017

- Fragmented Identity, Opera Gallery, Monaco
- Fragmented Figures, schultz contemporary, Berlin

2016

- Random Noise, Fabian & Claude Walter Gallery, Zurich
- Between Here and There, Opera Gallery, London

2015

- Breakfast with Velázquez, schultz contemporary, Berlin
- Just Another Day in Paradise, Brotkunsthalle Wien, Vienna
- Sequences, Opera Gallery, Geneva
- Figures & Interiors, Ludwiggalerie Schloss Oberhausen, Germany

2014

- Distorted Moments, Ludwig Museum, Koblenz
- The Forgotten Palace, Budapest Art Factory, Budapest
- Under my Skin, Fabian & Claude Walter Gallery, Zurich
- Between the Fragments, Claire Oliver Gallery, New York

2013

- Empire INC, Kunsthalle Rostock, Germany
- Dissolution & Resolution, Kunstraum Osper, Cologne

2012

- Interior/Exterior, Galerie Michael Schultz, Berlin
- The Sounds of Silence and Distortion, Claire Oliver Gallery, New York
- Shifting Landscapes, Kunsthalle Dresden, Germany
- Developing Landscapes, Gwangju Art Museum, Gwangju, Korea

2011

- Interiors, Fabian & Claude Walter Gallery, Zurich
- Freeze Frame, Michael Schultz Gallery, Seoul
- Dissonance and Contemplation, Claire Oliver Gallery, New York

2010

- The Human Nature Project, schultz contemporary, Berlin
- Distorted Questionments, Art + Art Gallery, Moscow

2009

- Motion Paintings, Gallery von Braunbehrens, Munich

2008

- Short Cuts, Fabian & Claude Walter Gallery, Zurich
- A Day at the Shore, Ruth Bachofner Gallery, Los Angeles

2007

- Blur Motion Paintings, Gallery von Braunbehrens, Munich
- Insomnia, Galeria Filomena Soares, Lisbon

2006

- Fusion Paintings, Ruth Bachofner Gallery, Los Angeles
- Moon Safari, Chelsea College, University of the Arts, London

2005

- American Paintings, Kashya Hildebrand, New York

2004

- Blur Motion Abstracts, Ruth Bachofner Gallery, Los Angeles

2002

- White Paintings, Ruth Bachofner Gallery, Los Angeles
