= Rostock Art Gallery =

Museum of contemporary art in Rostock, Germany

Coordinates: 54°5′55″N 12°5′16″E

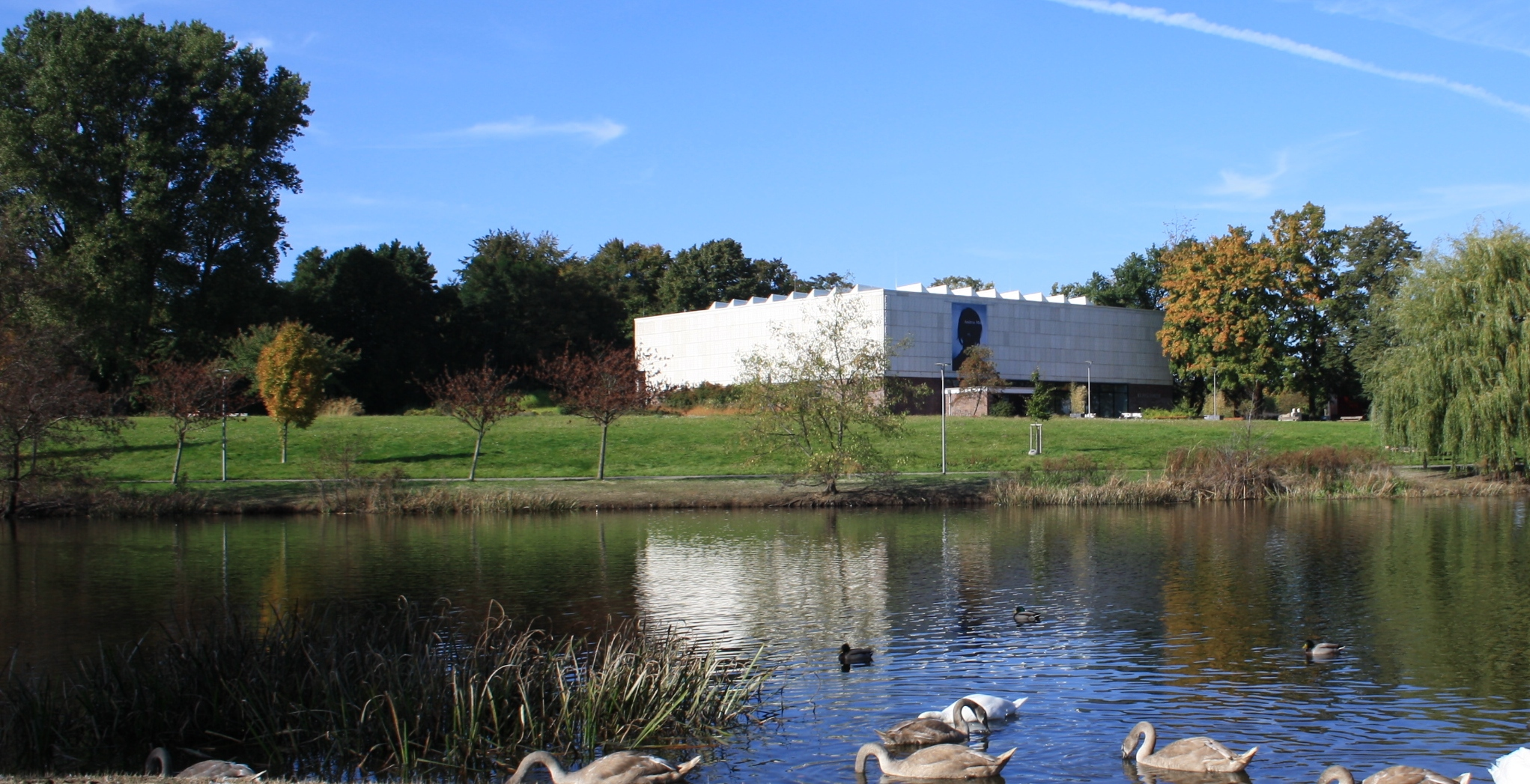
Rostock Art Gallery.

Rostock Art Gallery

The Rostock Art Gallery (German: Kunsthalle Rostock) was opened on 15 May 1969 as a museum of contemporary art in Rostock in the German federal state of Mecklenburg-Vorpommern. It is in the grounds of the park around the Schwanenteich lake in the quarter of Reutershagen.

== Exhibitions ==
- Georg Baselitz, Gotthard Graubner, Gerhard Richter, Günther Uecker — Credo — paintings
- Andreas Mühe — photography
- Otto Niemeyer-Holstein — Evviva la pittura — Es lebe die paintings — paintings
- Richard Serra — Paperworks — sketches and printed graphic art
- Walter Schels and Beate Lakotta — Noch mal Leben — photography and texts
- Norbert Bisky, Peggy Buth, Katharina Grosse, Gregor Hildebrandt, Antje Majewski, Thomas Rentmeister, Thomas Scheibitz and Amelie von Wulffen — Portfolio Berlin 01 — paintings and objects
- Paolo Roversi — Studio — photography
- A. R. Penck — Werke aus der Sammlung Böckmann — paintings
- Pop-Art aus dem Reich der Mitte — All the great modern things: China Total — paintings and objects
- Wolfgang Joop — Eternal Love — photography and objects
- Paul Wunderlich — Die Radierungen und Sammlung Székessy — etchings
- Ernst Barlach and Alexander Dettmar — Zwiesprache — sculptures and pictures
- Robert Rauschenberg — Close encounter
- Robert Rauschenberg — Seo — pictures
- Bert de Beul — Bilder 2002–2007 — paintings
- Camille Claudel — sculptures and sketches
- Christo and Jeanne-Claude — The Pont Neuf, Wrapped / Over the River — objects, graphical art, and photography
