= Bruno Voigt =

German political artist

Bruno Voigt (20 September 1912 – 14 October 1988) was a German political artist. His designs, paintings and drawings include secret biting commentaries on National Socialism produced in the 1930s. From 1951 to 1983 he was Director of the Gotha State Museums and from 1954 to 1959 of the East Asian collections of the Berlin State Museums, negotiating the return of Soviet-looted-artworks to the latter in 1956 and expanding the collections of the latter.

Those satirical works include Persil-Hitler (1933), The Nazis Are Here (1933), Attack (1932), Street Fighting (1932) and At the Sign of the Swastika (1934), putting him alongside John Heartfield, Hans and Lea Grundig, Johannes Wüsten, Otto Pankok, Alfred Frank and Eva Schulze-Knabe as major resistance artists. His works are in collections such as the Deutsches Historisches Museum in Berlin, the Militärhistorisches Museum der Bundeswehr in Dresden and the Kunstmuseum Moritzburg Halle (Saale) in Halle (Saale).

== Life ==
=== Early life ===
Born at Rathausstraße 11 in Gotha, he was the son of a housewife and a freethinking and fanatically anti-war drawing teacher. His father was a member of workers' and soldiers' councils and wrote for the SPD press as well as a part-time theatre critic. Voigt's parents set up a field hospital for wounded soldiers in their house during the 1920 Kapp Putsch. Bruno's family background also brought him into contact with theatre and art at an early age. His cousin married the architect Fred Forbát, who encouraged the young Bruno to draw and paint.

=== Weimar and the Nazis ===
From 1929 he studied under Walther Klemm at the Academy of Fine Arts in Weimar, where Bruno set up a studio in the university's Prellerhaus. He also became friends with the painter Alfred Ahner in Weimar and in 1931 joined the "Rote Einheit" (Red Unity) Communist artists' collective. He also worked for "Rote Raketen" (Red Rockets), a Communist agitprop theatre group. In 1932 he gained a contract with the Bavaria-Film-Verlag in Munich, but that company was dissolved the following year for producing 'degenerate art'.

In January 1933 the "Linkskartell der Geistesschaffenden“ zur Verhinderung des "Dritten Reiches"" (Left-Wing Cartel of Intellectuals for Preventing the "Third Reich") was founded in Voigt's studio, consisting of doctors and other independent personalities committed to the Social Democrats. The cartel dissolved itself after five sittings due to Hitler's seizure of power. Voigt, Martin Pohle and Alfred Ahner then set up the ASSO-Ortsgruppe Weimar, but this too soon self-dissolved.

In summer 1933 the SA and police destroyed books and artworks in Voigt's studio. In 1936, after restrictions placed upon him by the SA and the Nazi Party, he moved in with his aunt Hedwig Rücker in Ulrichshalben near Weimar, where he renounced direct political activity, supported himself through odd jobs and other means and met the artists Lyonel Feininger, Wassily Kandinsky and Oskar Kokoschka.

=== War and post-war ===
He was conscripted in 1941 and posted to the Eastern Front, where he was caught up in the Siege of Leningrad and fighting at Karelia. He was badly wounded in February 1944 and that September was transferred to the Netherlands, where after a few days he gave himself up to the British. In 1946, still a prisoner of war, he was transferred to the French mine-removal unit, whilst also working as a draughtmsan and interpreter.

He was finally freed in 1947 and sent to Gotha, by then in the Soviet Zone. There he joined the SED's party school in 1948 and the following year also joined the SED's district leadership for Culture and Propaganda and was appointed full-time study lead for teacher training at the Vocational Institute for Biology, Art and Workers' Movement History. He also became a city councillor for culture and education in Gotha and a district chairman for the Cultural Association of the DDR

In the 1950s he took on museum directorial posts in Gotha then Berlin, whilst in 1963 he edited Hokusai. Nine colour woodcuts, the catalogue of an exhibition at E. A. Seemann Verlag in Leipzig. He was married twice and had a son, Lucas, by his second marriage. Bruno died in East Berlin in 1988.

== Oeuvre ==
Voigt mainly worked in watercolour and ink on paper. His first surviving work dates to 1929, showing big-city cafe culture, street scenes and the rise of the SA's reign of terror. He stated:

The influence of George Grosz, Rudolf Schlichter and Karl Arnold on my drawings and etchings was definitive - I don't think it's plagiarism, but a question of the generation to which I belong.

He was still at the start of his artistic career when the Nazis seized power in January 1933 and was as yet little-known. His 1936 move to Ulrichshalbe and renunciation of direct political activity gave him relative personal safety but meant his work from then on was created in isolation, without an art scene promoting it and without advice, criticism or rejection. Voigt estimated that between 1929 and 1945 he produced around 20 paintings, 30 etchings and 500 drawings, with his last works in 1946-1947 produced in captivity to process his Eastern Front experiences.

The first public show of his work was only in 1978 in "Revolution und Realismus. Revolutionäre Kunst in Deutschland 1917–1933 " (Revolution and Realism. Revolutionary Art in Germany 1917–1933) at the Altes Museum in East Berlin, which marked the fiftieth anniversary of the formation of the ARBKD. Writer Wolfgang Thiede later wrote of Voigt that he was:

one of the very few artists who continued with figurative-political art in Nazi Germany, and by whom there are not only one or two works on the reality of German life between 1933 and 1945, but whose entire oeuvre (with its exquisite mixture of analysis, the will to survive and sexism) is a satirically interwoven, biting commentary on the era.

== Selected exhibitions ==
=== Solo ===
- 1983: Bruno Voigt. Am Vorabend der braunen Nacht, Satiricum, Greiz
- 1983/1984: Bruno Voigt. Gemälde, Zeichnungen, Grafik 1930–1948, Neue Münchner Galerie, Munich
- 1985: Bruno Voigt. Aquarelle, Zeichnungen, Radierungen, Galerie am Sachsenplatz, Leipzig
- 1987: Berlin in the 1920s and 1930s, a city of decadence, revolt and chaos: watercolors and drawings of Bruno Voigt, Haggerty Museum of Art/Marquette University, Milwaukee, Wisconsin
- 1988: Bruno Voigt. Arbeiten auf Papier, Galerie Bodo Niemann, West-Berlin
- 1988/1989: Bruno Voigt 1912–1988. Widerstandskunst 1933–1944, AGO-Galerie, West-Berlin
- 2005: Kurt Erhard, Bruno Voigt. Zwei Künstler der verlorenen Generation, Galerie Hebecker, Weimar

=== Group ===
- 1978/1979: Revolution und Realismus. Revolutionäre Kunst in Deutschland 1917–1933. Zum 50. Jahrestag der Gründung der ARBKD. Ausstellungskatalog, Altes Museum, Ost-Berlin
- 1981: 25 Jahre NVA, Ausstellungszentrum am Fučík-Platz, Dresden
- 1983: Maler bauen Barrikaden, Haus der Kultur und Bildung, Neubrandenburg, Rostock
- 1984/1985: Die Stadt in den Zwanziger Jahren, Galerie Bodo Niemann, West-Berlin
- 1986: Worin unsere Stärke besteht. Kampfaktionen der Arbeiterklasse im Spiegel der bildenden Kunst. Museum der Bildenden Künste, Leipzig
- 1987: Ich und die Stadt. Mensch und Großstadt in der deutschen Kunst des 20. Jahrhunderts, Martin-Gropius-Bau, West-Berlin
- 1988: Künstler im Klassenkampf. Sonderausstellung des Museums für deutsche Geschichte (Zum 60. Jahrestag der ARBKD-Gründung), Ost-Berlin

== Catalogues ==
- Bruno Voigt. Gemälde, Zeichnungen, Grafik 1930–1948. Ausstellungskatalog, Neue Münchner Galerie, München 1983/1984.
- Bruno Voigt. Aquarelle, Zeichnungen, Radierungen. Ausstellungskatalog, Galerie am Sachsenplatz/Staatlicher Kunsthandel der DDR, Leipzig 1986.
- Berlin in the 1920s and 1930s, a city of decadence, revolt and chaos: watercolors and drawings of Bruno Voigt. Ausstellungskatalog, Haggerty Museum of Art/Marquette University, Milwaukee, Wisconsin 1987 (3 Abbildungen).
- Bruno Voigt. Arbeiten auf Papier. Ausstellungskatalog, Galerie Bodo Niemann, West-Berlin 1988 (5 Abbildungen).
- Wolfgang Thiede (1988), Bruno Voigt 1912–1988, Widerstandskunst 1933–1944, Berlin: AGO-Galerie, ISBN 978-3-927415-00-3

== Bibliography (in German) ==
- Voigt, Bruno. In: Dietmar Eisold (ed.): Lexikon Künstler in der DDR. Verlag Neues Leben, Berlin 2010, ISBN 978-3-355-01761-9, page 982
- Revolution und Realismus. Revolutionäre Kunst in Deutschland 1917–1933. Zum 50. Jahrestag der Gründung der ARBKD. Ausstellungskatalog, Altes Museum, Ost-Berlin 1978.
- Ursula Leibinger-Hasibether, Einer, den es zu entdecken gab: Bruno Voigt. In: Tendenzen. Nr. 146, April–Juni 1984, pages 76f. (4 Abbildungen).
- Die Stadt in den Zwanziger Jahren. Ausstellungskatalog, Galerie Bodo Niemann, West-Berlin 1984/1985 (6 Abbildungen).
- Ich und die Stadt. Mensch und Großstadt in der deutschen Kunst des 20. Jahrhunderts. Ausstellungskatalog, Berlinische Galerie, Berlin 1987, ISBN 3-87584-213-8, pages 202, 203 (2 pictures),
- Künstler im Klassenkampf. Sonderausstellung des Museums für deutsche Geschichte (Zum 60. Jahrestag der ARBKD-Gründung). Ost-Berlin 1988.
