= Alice Lex-Nerlinger =

German woman artist photographer

Alice Lex-Nerlinger (29 October 1893 – 21 July 1975) was a German mid-20th century artist in the media of painting, photography, photomontage and photograms.

== Early life ==
Born on 29 October 1893, Alice was the youngest of six children of Nathalie (née Drägen) and Heinrich "Fritz" Pfeffer, owners of a gas lamp factory on Moritzplatz in Berlin-Kreuzberg. From 1899 she attended the Royal Augusta Girls School in Kleinbeerenstrasse in Berlin-Kreuzberg, but the early death of the father left the family in straitened circumstances, and she was moved in 1910 to a girls' boarding school under the direction of Baroness von Wrangel, but absconded after three months.

From September 1911 and during the First World War until 1914, Alice Lex studied painting and graphic art under Emil Orlik, among others, at the educational institution at the Museum of Decorative Arts with fellow students George Grosz and Hannah Höch, and there in 1912 met Oskar Nerlinger (1893–1969), whom she married in 1918. As a student she began exhibiting in the annual Große Berliner Kunstausstellung in 1915, and by 1918, had produced a series of eight Expressionist-style prints illustrating Eduard Reinacher's war poem Der Tod von Grallenfels. Berlin in the 20s was a laboratory for expressionist, Dadaist and futuristic rebels and Lex-Nerlinger, amongst them, tried out different styles and media searching for a politically effective means of expression. After graduation, she worked as a window-dresser in a Tempelhof department store, and designs fabrics for Kaufhaus Wertheim on Leipziger Straße.

In 1918 Lex-Nerlinger joined Oskar in Strasbourg, he having completed his military service there and on 23 March they married and returned to Berlin in 1919, together running an antique shop. They frequented events at the gallery associated with Herwarth Walden's expressionist journal Der Sturm, and took part in the monthly 'Die Abstrakten' group soirees in the studio of Arthur Segal.

Dissatisfied with the bourgeoise politics of these organisations, in 1927 Lex-Nerlinger and her husband became members of the Communist KPD and, in 1928, of the Bund revolutionärer Künstler (Association of Revolutionary Visual Artists), whose aim was to use art as a weapon in the class struggle. She began to design successful political posters, drawing no distinction between the applied work and that which she exhibited. Though born Alice Pfeffer, and having taken her artist husband Otto Nerlinger's last name after their marriage, by 1927, in order to distinguish her production from his and evincing a feminist stance, she took the un-gendered nom de guerre 'Lex', but is now generally identified by her hyphenated name.

== Career ==
For twenty years Lex-Nerlinger was part of an international avant-garde photography scene which centred on the Neues Sehen ('New Vision') emerging in Germany, a style she embraces in her straight photography of the period, all with a feminist ethos, and was represented in the 1929 in the Stuttgart showing of Film und Foto. Especially interested in the situation of her sisterhood, her documentary photography including the 1928 series Working Women, the subjects are shown yoked to the machinery of industry. The poultry breeder poses half-hidden behind chicken-wire, or the seamstress is bent over her sewing machine, dreaming, in double-exposure of the carefree happiness of her girlhood, while the typist frustratedly scrubs at a misprint with an eraser.

in 1929, she was among photographers included in Werner Graeff's (1901–1978) Es kommt der neue Fotograf! ('Here comes the new photographer!'), published in Berlin by Hermann Reckendorf, a German orientalist, arabist and literary scholar. and was the only woman represented in the volume. Her contribution was a political photomontage of the same year. In it she depicted soldiers and police, multiplied through photographic means, encircling a group of workers locked out of their workplace during industrial action; the figures of authority are directed by a raised fist representing the employers.

== Themes and style ==
Lex-Nerlinger first experimented with photomontage for a 1927 children's picture book dedicated to her son, Peter, then used the medium to political ends from 1928 then until 1933, the didactic and gradually more diagrammatic work for which she is best known.

"Die Arbeiten des 'Bundes revolutionärer bildender Künstler' bestanden nicht aus formalistischen, individualistischen Spielereien, sondern diesen Künstlern kam es darauf an, den revolutionären Klassenkampf mit der scharfen Waffe der politischen Fotomontage zu unterstützen" ("The work of the 'Federal Revolutionary Visual Artist' was not to play formalist, individualistic games, but to support the revolutionary class struggle with the sharp weapon of political photomontage.")

Her photomontage Work! Work! Work! (1928), for example, illustrates the everyday reality of life for the anonymous (and in her imagery, literally faceless) proletariat: a drab exchange of machine production for the hasty gobbling of dry bread in work-soiled hands. The stop-watch in the capitalist's leather-gloved hand sets the rhythm, echoed in the mechanical repetition of the workers' fists, in a spiralling composition.

That female self-determination entails more than employment is evident in Lex-Nerlinger's most famous work Paragraph 218 of 1931 (pencil drawing, spray paint); an appeal against a paragraph of the law which punished those providing abortions with imprisonment and which had led to two prominent physicians Friedrich Wolf and Else Kienle being remanded in custody. While Wolf was soon released on bail, Else Kienle was released only after five weeks and a hunger strike. There was much public controversy over the issue and protests among Lex-Nerlinger's comrades in the communist movement. The magazine, Weg der Frau ('Women's Way'), held an exhibition on the theme Frauen in Not ('Women in Need'), featuring two works by Alice Lex-Nerlinger. In her work the women are not presented as victims but as group who strive in solidarity and strength against a giant cross that reads "Paragraph 218", toppling it.

Lex-Nerlinger addressed her traumatic experience of the First World War and its horrific aftermath in works such the 1931 Feldgrau schafft Dividende ('Field Gray creates dividends') denouncing capitalist profit-making through war (the title comes from an article in one of the Communist leftist papers). A factory in the background churns out armaments directly to a screaming soldier who – entangled in barbed wire – occupies half of the image. Using an air-brush to repeat the blank factory windows, faceless workers, tanks and shells, she explains the causes of a social evil with non-photographic means as forcefully as in her black-and-white photomontages, such as Giftgas ('Poison Gas) of 1929.

Originally titled Menschen auf der Straße (People on the Street) and produced specifically for Die Straße, a printmaking exhibition she and other members of Die Abstrakten organized to appear within the 1930 Große Berliner Kunstausstellunger, her Arm und Reich (Rich and Poor) of 1929 makes class difference explicit through vignettes to make direct comparisons; the elderly well-to-do relaxes in a café while outside the war invalid begs; the child of the rich woman pedals his toy car along the street beside her, while the children of the poor share their pram with newspapers being sold by their heavily pregnant mother; the tennis player exercises for recreation while the worker labours over his jackhammer. Each of the abutted scenes is constructed in the darkroom from intricately cut paper printed as photograms; an exercise in masking that exploits the negative image and the texture and transparency of paper. Repetitions underline the imbalance in the ratio of numbers of poor to rich, but none is printed exactly the same, as the photogram technique entails variations in density and different degrees of light 'bleed' under the cut paper templates.

In 1931 Lex-Nerlinger participated in a major exhibition of photomontage that took place at the Kunstgewerbemuseum in Berlin. Also invited were John Heartfield, Andre Kertesz, Hannah Höch, Laszlo Moholy-Nagy, Oskar Nerlinger, Albert Renger-Patsch, and other prominent artists of the day.

Most productive in the years up to 1933 and the rise of Hitler she developed her spray technique at the same time as photographing and montaging; forms and materials selected for their capacity to urge critical and revolutionary messages:

All my work had the aim of collaborating to improve people’s lives, and nothing seemed more senseless than for an artist to paint for snobs at a time when people were more and more impoverished.

== Imprisonment and obscurity ==
With the seizure of power by the National Socialists Lex-Nerlinger was expelled from the "Reich Association of Fine Artists" and banned from practising her profession or exhibiting. She and her husband were periodically arrested and taken for interrogation and their studio was frequently raided, though their status in the Berlin art community may have protected her from the life-sentences meted out to lesser-known colleagues. Following a short imprisonment in 1933 she retreated into an 'inner emigration' and did not publish until 1945. Fearing raids on her studio, she destroyed much of her work and the depredations of the Second World War obliterated much of the rest. We are left with only the vestiges of her output of this period, though researchers like Ira Plein of the University of Luxembourg's Luxembourg Center for Contemporary and Digital History, whose German language master's thesis Alice Lex Nerlinger (1893 – 1975) Motifs and imagery in the service of the class struggle 1928–1933 passed at the University of Trier in 2012, are searching the archives and ephemera of the era for what can be salvaged. Having rediscovered the artist in the mid-2000s, US feminist art historian Rachel Epp Buller, with a grant from the Fulbright Foundation in 2011, searched the artist's archive at the Berlin Academy of Arts, then in cooperation with the academy and assistance of the gallery, mounted Lex-Nerlinger's first retrospective in 2016, appropriately at the "Hidden Museum".

== Post-War in the German Democratic Republic ==
For the last three decades of her life, Lex-Nerlinger continued as a well-known graphic designer and portraitist in the GDR, working until the day she died in 1975, but under the state's sanctioning of Socialist Realism her photomontages, that she had worked so hard to master, were denounced as "formalistic". However, the force of her image Paragraph 218 was restored when it was taken up by the women's movement of the 1970s.

Even without a contract in the fifties Lex-Nerlinger created photo-derived portraits of workers, among which is the painting Schaffnerin Anni ('Conductor Anni') the now legendary streetcar artist. Anni faces the viewer head-on, looks us in the face with a challenging smile and points to her tram-conductor's money changer, which in street jargon is a "Krautkasse" ("Herb’s purse"), which she wears around her neck. She was the mother of Hannelore Kraft, a German politician who was the president of the Bundesrat, the first woman to hold the office.

== Exhibitions ==
- 1929-1931: Internationale Ausstellung des Deutschen Werkbunds Film und Foto (FiFo), Städtische Ausstellungshallen, Stuttgart, 18 May – 7 July 1929, and traveling to:
  - Kunstgewerbemuseum, Zürich 28 August – 22 September 1929;
  - atrium of the former Kunstgewerbemuseum, Prinz-Albrechs-Strasse 7, Berlin 19 October – 17 November 1929;
  - Stadtmuseum, Danzig (dates unknown); Österreichisches Museum, Vienna 20 February – 31 March 1930;
  - Agram (Zagreb) 5–14 April 1930;
  - Münchner Bund/Verein Ausstellungspark München E.V. (as part of an international exhibition of photography), Munich 5 June – 7 September 1930;
  - Asahi Shimbun, Tokyo April 1931;
  - Asahi Shimbun, Osaka 1–7 July 1931.
- 1931: Ausstellung Künstler im Klassenkampf, 4. Ausstellung Revolutionäre Bildmontage ('Artists in the class struggle, 4th Exhibition Revolutionary image-montage'), Kunstgewerbemuseum in Berlin, February.
- 1931: International Exhibition Frauen in Not ('Women in Need'), Landesausstellungsgebäude am Lehrter Bahnhof, 9 October to 1 November
- 1975: joint retrospective of Alice Lex-Nerlinger and Oskar Nerlinger, Neue Gesellschaft für bildende Kunst, 14 October – 18 November
- 2005: Neues Sehen in Berlin: Fotografie der Zwanziger Jahre, Kunstbibliothek, Museum für Fotografie, Staatliche Museen zu Berlin, 16 September – 20 November
- 2016: Retrospective curated by Rachel Epp Buller, Das Verborgene Museum, 14 April – 7 August
