= Association of Revolutionary Visual Artists =

German Communist organization

The Association of Revolutionary Visual Artists of Germany (German: Assoziation revolutionärer bildender Künstler Deutschlands, or ARBKD) was an organization of artists who were members of the Communist Party of Germany (Kommunistische Partei Deutschlands, or KPD). Known primarily by its shortened name, "Asso", it was founded in March 1928. The organization produced posters, placards, and propaganda graphics for Communist organizations.

== History ==
1930s logo of Antifaschistische Aktion, designed by Max Gebhard and Max Keilson

The Rote Fahne reported on 19 June 1928 that the Asso had been founded as a "brother organization" to the Association of Revolutionary Artists of Russia. In spring 1931, the name was changed from "Assoziation" to "Bund" ("Federation").

Left-wing artists had already formed groups, such as the November Group, Dadaist groups, or from 1924 to 1926, the Red Group, with which George Grosz, John Heartfield and Rudolf Schlichter were involved. Heinrich Vogeler had also formed the Arbeitsgemeinschaft kommunistischer Künstler ("Working Group of Communist Artists"). Further impetus to form a larger organization came from the "Central Atelier for Visual Propaganda", an arm of the KPD offices at the Karl-Liebknecht-Haus in Berlin.

Several groups joined the Asso. The Brotherhood of Vagabonds, where artist Gregor Gog was active, joined the Asso in 1931. In 1932, the group "The Moderns" ("Die Zeitgemäßen"), headed by Oskar Nerlinger and previously called "The Abstracts", joined as well. The Asso also embraced Franz Wilhelm Seiwert's group of progressive artists, the Cologne Progressives, and the "Collective for Socialist Building".

The Asso published a journal called Der Stoßtrupp and its first exhibition was in Berlin in 1929. For many Communist artists, art was a "weapon" to be used rallying the masses to the class struggle. Accordingly, the Asso produced placards, posters, propaganda art and banners for the Communist Party, Rote Hilfe and other organizations.

The 1932 logo of Antifaschistische Aktion was designed by Max Gebhard and Max Keilson for the Asso and since the 1980s has been widely used in modified form in Germany and globally by Antifa groups.

The organization, with 800 members, was banned after the Nazis seized power in 1933.

== Notable members ==
- Karl von Appen, 1932
- Theo Balden, 1929
- Alfred Beier-Red, 1928 (Berlin)
- Rudolf Bergander, 1930 (Dresden)
- Gerhart Bettermann, Brotherhood of Vagabonds
- Erich Arnold Bischof
- Ernst Bursche, 1929? (Dresden)
- Siegfried Donndorf
- Fritz Duda, 1928 (Berlin)
- Helen Ernst 1931 (Berlin)
- Alfred Frank (Leipzig)
- Paul Fuhrmann 1929 (Berlin) The Abstracts
- Max Gebhard
- Franz Edwin Gehrig-Targis 1928 (Berlin) Karl-Liebknecht-Haus
- Gregor Gog, Brotherhood of Vagabonds
- Otto Griebel, 1929 (Dresden)
- George Grosz (Berlin)
- Lea and Hans Grundig, 1929
- Herbert Gute (Dresden)
- Eugen Hoffmann 1929 (Dresden)
- Hans Jüchser 1930 (Dresden)
- Heinz Kiwitz (Duisburg)
- Wilhelm Lachnit 1929 (Dresden)
- Carl Lauterbach (Düsseldorf)
- Julo Levin (Düsseldorf)
- Erna Lincke (Dresden)
- Peter Ludwigs (Düsseldorf)
- Kurt Massloff (Leipzig)
- Alice Lex-Nerlinger and Oskar Nerlinger 1928 (Berlin)
- Otto Nagel 1928, co-founder (Berlin)
- Laszlo Peri 1928
- Curt Querner 1930 (Dresden)
- Herbert Sandberg 1929 (Berlin)
- Fritz Schulze 1930? (Dresden)
- Eva Schulze-Knabe 1929 (Dresden)
- Kurt Schütze 1929 (Dresden)
- Karl Schwesig (Düsseldorf)
- Willy Wolff 1930 (Dresden)

== Sources ==
- Meyers Großes Taschenlexikon, in 24 Bd. Bd 2. BI-Taschenbuch, Mannheim/Vienna/Zurich (1987) ISBN 3-411-02900-5
- Meyers Kleines Lexikon, in 3 Bd. Vol. 1, Leipzig (1967, 1971)
