= Erhard Frommhold =

German writer and art historian

- Born: 20 May 1928; Altenburg, Thuringia, Germany
- Died: 17 October 2007; Dresden, Saxony, Germany
- Occupations: Writer on the Arts and Art history
- Political party: KPD

Erhard Frommhold (20 May 1928 – 17 October 2007) was a leading German writer and art historian.

He was a committed socialist, but he was not always an uncritical supporter of the Party line in the German Democratic Republic which is where, while that state existed, he lived and made his career.

== Life ==
Erhard Frommold was born in Altenburg, a midsized, then largely working-class town roughly equidistant between Leipzig to the north and Zwickau to the south. Before his fifth birthday Germany had undergone a significant regime change when in January 1933 the Nazi Party took power and lost little time in imposing Germany's first twentieth century one- party dictatorship. Frommold grew up in an Anti-fascist family, however. By the time he left school, European war had resumed, and he undertook an apprenticeship as a plumber. War ended in May 1945 and the entire central portion of Germany, including Thuringia and Saxony, was redesignated as the Soviet occupation zone. In February 1946 Erhard Frommold joined the Communist Party.

He underwent a career switch in 1947 when he embarked on a four-year study course at Jena, focusing on Sociology along with the History of Art and Literature. This defined the rest of his career, and in 1951/52 he obtained a post with the newly formed Verlag der Kunst (Arts Publisher) in Dresden. He started out as a Literary editor, later becoming editor in chief of the books department. He remained with the Verlag der Kunst till 1991, although he was obliged to quit his position as Editor in Chief in 1968 after it was noticed by the authorities that a literary evaluation by Frommhold on an almost forgotten work by the distinguished scholar Wilhelm Fraenger had failed to apply the stigma of "Bourgeois decadence". During his time at the Verlag der Kunst Frommhold was a prolific producer of Monographs. His better remembered subjects include Otto Nagel, Hans and Lea Grundig, Lasar Segall and Klaus Wittkugel. Another noted achievement was the publication by Verlag der Kunst, starting in 1958, of the "Fundus series", a collection of international Marxist texts on Aesthetics, Art history and Cultural history which, despite not following the East German Party line, were able to become established texts.

During the final year of his life Erhard Frommert suffered from heart disease, and it was a heart attack that killed him in Dresden on 17 October 2007.
