= Harald Metzkes =

German painter (1929–2026)

- Born: Harald Metzkes; 23 January 1929; Bautzen, Saxony, Germany
- Died: 14 May 2026 (aged 97); Wegendorf, Brandenburg, Germany
- Occupations: Painter, graphic artist
- Spouse: Elrid Fiebig/Metzkes (1932–2014)
- Children: 3

Harald Metzkes (23 January 1929 – 14 May 2026) was a German painter and graphic artist.

== Life and career ==
Harald Metzkes was born and grew up in Bautzen, a long-established mid-sized town in eastern Saxony. His father was a doctor. In 1945 he undertook war service, but he was able to pass his school leaving exams in 1945/46 at the local secondary school, and progress to the study of art. In 1946 he studied watercolor painting under Alfred Herzog. Between 1947 and 1949 he was apprenticed as a stonemason with the Bautzen sculptor Max Rothe. After that, between 1949 and 1953, he studied painting at the Dresden Academy of Fine Arts where his teachers included Wilhelm Lachnit and Rudolf Bergander. From 1953 till 1955 he worked as a freelance artist in Bautzen. Between 1955 and 1958 he was a Meisterschüler (literally "Master student"), studying under Otto Nagel, at the Arts Academy in Berlin. In 1957, with Werner Stötzer, along with John and Gertrud Heartfield, he undertook a three-month study trip to China.

In 1959 Metzkes settled on the southside of East Berlin, moving into a studio-workshop apartment in 1960: he embarked on a career as a free-lance artist, identified in some quarters by the soubriquet "The Cézannist of Prenzlauer Berg". The first exhibition devoted to his work took place in Berlin in 1963. 1963 was also the year in which he contributed illustrations for a book by Vladimir Pozner, "The enchanted one". During the ensuing 27 years he contributed illustrations for a further fifteen books, mostly by high-profile authors, including Marino Moretti, William Heinesen, Pier Paolo Pasolini, Franz Fühmann, Christa Wolf, Hermann Bang, August Strindberg, and Theodor Fontane.

In 1976 he won the Arts Academy of East Germany's Käthe Kollwitz Prize, and state-level official recognition in the form of the Banner of Labor. In 1976 he was also awarded the National Prize of East Germany for illustrations and graphic art. The next year his work was the focus of an exhibition at the National Gallery in (East) Berlin, "Harald Metzkes – Two decades of Pictures". In 1984 and 1988 Metzkes participated in the Venice Biennale. Some years after the end of the German Democratic Republic, the Soviet-sponsored one-party state of which he had been a citizen throughout its politically and socially troubled existence, Metzkes took part in the "Arts in the German Democratic Republic" exhibition staged in 1997/98 at the National Gallery. Another of the numerous exhibitions in which he was featured, in 2006, was "Bilanz des Malers" at Gottorf Castle in the extreme north of the country.

Metzkes died in Wegendorf on 14 May 2026, at the age of 97.
