= Grundig (disambiguation) =

Grundig was a German consumer electronics manufacturer.

Grundig may also refer to:

== People ==
- Hans Grundig (1901–1958), German painter and graphic artist
- Lea Grundig (1906–1977), German painter and Graphic artist
- Max Grundig (1908–1989), founder of electronics company Grundig

== Other uses ==
- Grundig Business Systems (GBS), a German company
- Grundig mobile, a mobile phone brand in Spain
- Grundig (band), later called Cold
