= Wilhelm Lachnit =

German painter

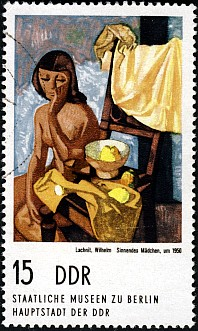
A Wilhelm Lachnit painting in a stamp of the GDR

Wilhelm Lachnit (12 November 1899 – 14 November 1962) was a German painter who was primarily active in Dresden.

== Life ==
Lachnit was born in the small town of Gittersee; his family moved to Dresden in 1906. He studied at the Kunstgewerbeschule Dresden under Richard Guhr, and later at the Dresden Academy of Fine Arts, where he was acquainted with and influenced by Otto Dix, Conrad Felixmüller, and Otto Griebel. He joined the Communist Party of Germany in 1924 and was active in producing various forms of Agitprop throughout the 1920s. He co-founded the "Neue Gruppe" with Hans Grundig, Otto Griebel, and Fritz Skade; successful exhibitions in Paris, Düsseldorf, Amsterdam, and Dresden followed.

After the Nazis seized power in 1933, Lachnit's work was declared "degenerate" and confiscated by authorities. During this period he was not allowed to make art and worked as an exhibition designer. Much of his confiscated work was destroyed during the February 1945 firebombing of Dresden. His 1923 watercolours Man and Woman in the Window and "Girl at Table" were found in the Munich Art Hoard.

Lachnit continued to paint after the end of World War II. In 1947 he was appointed professor at the Hochschule für Bildene Künste Dresden. Among his more important students were Jürgen Böttcher, Manfred Böttcher, and Harald Metzkes.

Lachnit died of a heart attack in 1962 and was buried in Loschwitzer Friedhof in Dresden.

== See also ==
- Association of Revolutionary Visual Artists
