= Querner =

Querner is a German surname. Notable people with the surname include:

- Curt Querner (1904–1976), German painter
- Rudolf Querner (1893–1945), German SS functionary
