= Daniel Djamo =

Romanian artist and filmmaker

- Born: Daniel Nicolae Djamo; May 4, 1987 (age 39); Bucharest Municipal, Romania
- Education: Bucharest National University of Arts
- Occupations: Artist, director, filmmaker
- Years active: 2009–present

Daniel Nicolae Djamo is a Romanian visual artist and filmmaker. He finished the courses (BA and MA) of the Time-Based Media department of the Bucharest National University of Arts, from Bucharest. He finished the PhD in Visual Arts at the School for Doctoral Studies, from Bucharest National University of Arts in June 2018.

Winner of the ESSL Art Award CEE (offered by the Essl Museum), Henkel Art.Award. Young artist prize CEE (offered by Museum Moderner Kunst Stiftung Ludwig Wien – mumok and Kulturkontakt Austria), Startpoint Prize Romania (offered by Arbor vitae Foundation, with support from the Ministry of Culture (Czech Republic) and the Grand Prize of the Bucharest National University of Arts.

He exhibited or presented at the Museum of Moscow, Centre for Fine Arts, Brussels (BOZAR), Louvre Museum, Austrian Museum of Folk Life and Folk Art, Arsenale di Venezia, Museum of Contemporary Art, Belgrade, Bank Austria Kunstforum Wien, Oxo Tower, Mori Art Museum, Asia Culture Center and Asia Culture Institute, Historical Museum of Bosnia and Herzegovina, Skulpturenmuseum Glaskasten, Museum of Contemporary Art in Kraków (MOCAK), Bucharest Museum of Contemporary Art and the Essl Museum from Klosterneuburg (Vienna). His video artworks have been screened in numerous video art and film festivals.

== Feature film ==
Djamo finished in 2014 a documentary about the woman who helped his mother raise him, entitled "A last year in 114 minutes". The movie had its premiere in June 2014, at Transilvania International Film Festival, in Cluj (Romania).

== Solo exhibitions ==
- 2018 "The Good, the Bad and the Ugly" (October – April 2019), Le Shadok: Fabrique du Numérique, Strasbourg, France, curators: Marine Froeliger & Michel Jacquet
- 2018 "16 Sounds of Dadaocheng" (October – November), URS127 – Art Factory, Taipei, Taiwan, curators: Hsun-Chen Lin & Yi-Kai Kao; with support from Jing-Liang Jung and Melody Ho
- 2018 "Past futures" (February – April), Likovni Salon Gallery – Celje Center for Contemporary Art, Celje, Slovenia, curator: Maja Hodošček
- 2018 "Happy Dystopia #4" (January – February), NRVK – Neuer Ravensburger Kunstverein, Ravensburg, Germany, curator: Robert Huber; opening speech: Christian von der Heydt (Director of Wirtschafts Museum Ravensburg – Ravensburg Museum of Economy); with support from Ricarda Patientosch
- 2017 "rise of nations" (August – September), Künstlerhaus Dortmund, Dortmund, Germany, curator: Tanita Groß
- 2017 "Sixteen routes to the perfect sunshine" (January – February), Galerija K18, Maribor, Slovenia, curator: Simon Žlahtič
- 2016 "Magic… you want?" (October – November), AAI – Afro-Asiatisches Institut Graz, Graz, Austria, curator: Astrid Kury
- 2016 "Bjergtrolde" land art project (developed: May – June, permanently on view until the eventual deterioration), supported by Prof. Christel Stalpaert and Jan Hermans (presented alongside Sarah Foque's project from De Wattenfabriek), ARPIA – art with landscape, Herzele, Belgium (special thanks: European Agricultural Fund for Rural Development, Provincie Oost-Vlaanderen / East Flanders Province, the city of Herzele, KASK – Royal Academy of Fine Arts Ghent & Ghent University; project planned between 2015 and 2016)
- 2015 "before the end" (March – April), KKW (KunstKraftWerk Leipzig), Leipzig, Germany, curator: Tatevik Sahakyan (with support from The Romanian Cultural Institute)
- 2015 "Unicorn tales" (January – February), Victoria Art Gallery – Center for Contemporary Cultural Production, Bucharest, Romania, curator: Daria Ghiu
- 2015 "The origin of the florist" (June – July), The Stage (WOLO & Wei-Ling Gallery), Kuala Lumpur, Malaysia, curator: Tatevik Sahakyan
- 2015 "Who's afraid of Blue, Yellow and Red?" (July – September), Anca Poterașu Gallery, Bucharest, Romania, curator: Ioana Mandeal
- 2015 "Unsichtbare Skulpturen" (October – December), Schloss Plüschow, Plüschow, Germany, curator: Tatevik Sahakyan
- 2014 "items" (February – May), Anca Poterașu Gallery, Bucharest, Romania – "items", curator: Anca Poterasu
- 2014 "before the end" (November – December), The Briggait, Glasgow, UK, curator: Tatevik Sahakyan
- 2014 "A family matter" (November), solo show with Anca Poterașu Gallery at Artissima, Turin, Italy, curator: Anca Poterasu
- 2014 "Never glue birds to the ground" (September), Schleifmühlgasse 12–14 Gallery, Vienna, Austria, curator: Carmen Bendovski
- 2013 "дo Ende" (February – March), Victoria Art Gallery – Center for Contemporary Cultural Production, Bucharest, curator: Petru Lucaci
- 2013 "Costs" (June), Victoria Art Gallery – Center for Contemporary Cultural Production, Bucharest, self-curated (my BA degree exhibition)
- 2012 "Showroom" (July – August), Calina Gallery, Timișoara, Romania, curator: Diana Marincu
- 2012 "RULAND" (June), TOKONOMA, Kassel, Germany, curator: Daniel Stubenvoll
