= Werner Stötzer =

German artist and sculptor (1931-2010)

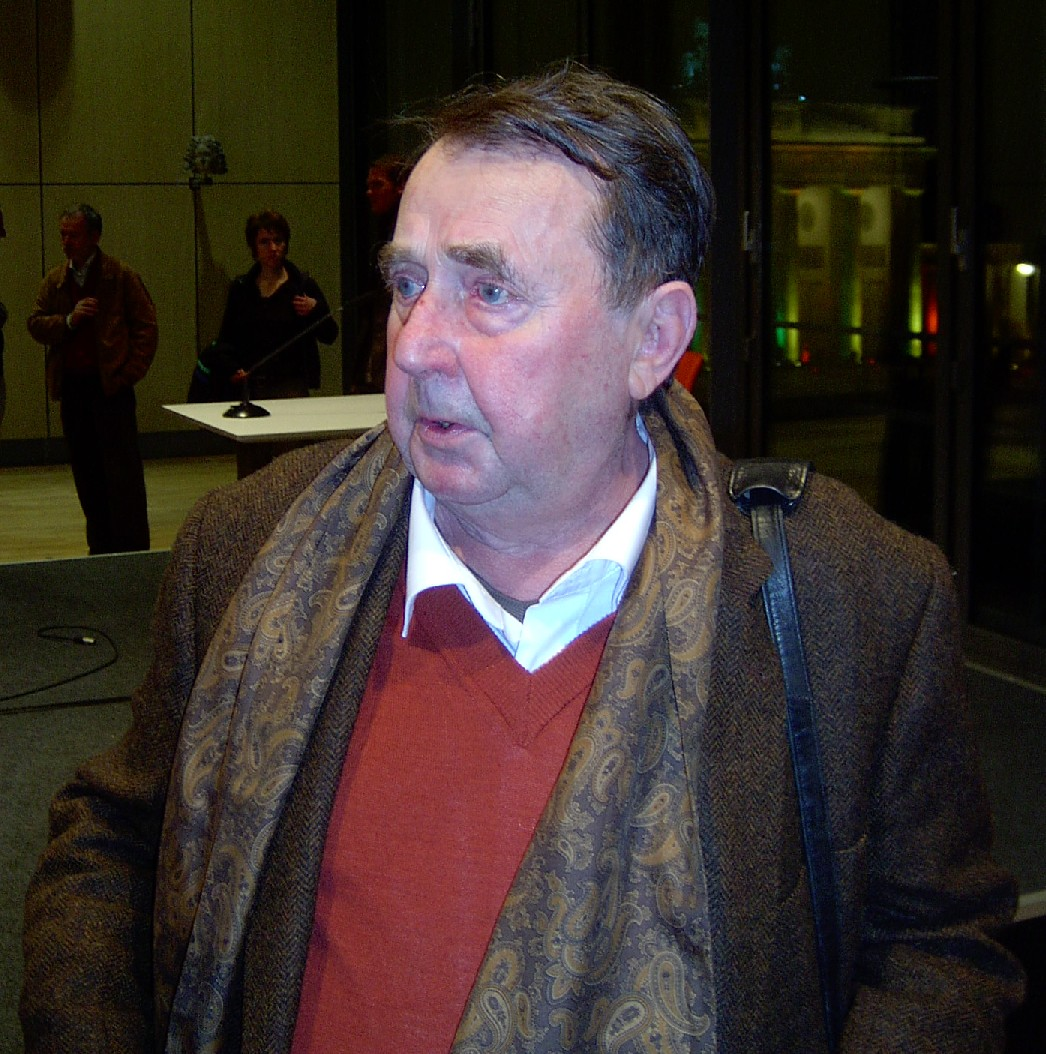
- Werner Stötzer (2006)
- Born: 2 April 1931; Sonneberg, Germany
- Died: 22 July 2010 (aged 79); Altlangsow, Germany
- Occupation: Sculptor
- Spouse: Sylvia Hagen
- Children: 1 son, 1 daughter

Werner Stötzer (born Sonneberg 2 April 1931, died Altlangsow 22 July 2010) was a German artist and sculptor. For the last three decades of his life he lived and worked in Altlangsow (administratively part of Seelow) in the marshy Oderbruch region of Brandenburg.

== Life ==
After training as a ceramics modeller at the Vocational Arts Academy in Sonneberg, Stötzer moved on to study between 1949 and 1951 at the Grand Ducal Arts Academy in Weimar, where his teachers included Heinrich Domke, Hans van Breek and Siegfried Tschiersky. Because of a reorganisation at the Weimar academy he then transferred to Dresden where he continued his studies at the city's Academy of Fine Arts from 1951 till 1953, taught by Eugen Hoffmann and Walter Arnold. Between 1954 and 1958 her was a "Master Schoolman" (Meisterschüler) with Gustav Seitz at the Berlin Academy of Arts where contemporaries included Manfred Böttcher, Harald Metzkes and the painter Ernst Schroeder. He formed lifelong friendships with the first two of these three. On concluding his time as a Master Schoolman he embarked on a career as a freelance artist.

In 1974 he worked with Konrad Wolf on the tragicomedy film The Naked Man on the Sports Ground ("Der nackte Mann auf dem Sportplatz"), himself taking a small cameo role as the town mayor.

Werner Stötzer also worked as a teacher. From 1975 to 1978 he was a guest lecturer at the Berlin-Weißensee High Arts Academy, and between 1987 and 1990 he held a teaching professorship at the East German Arts Academy. From 1978 he was employed at the Berlin Arts Academy where he served as Vice-president from 1990-1993. and where he personally mentored a number of younger artists. His own "Master Schoolmen" from this period included Horst Engelhardt, Berndt Wilde, Joachim Böttcher (1989-1992) and Mark Lammert.

Werner Stötzer was first married to graphic artist Renate Rauschenbach from 1961 to 1992. With their daughter Carla (*1961) they lived in their house in Berlin-Altglienicke from 1961 to 1978. After living in a succession of apartments and ateliers in Berlin and Vilmnitz (Putbus) on the Island of Rügen, he relocated to Altlangsow, some 70 km (45 miles) to the east of Berlin and (since 1945) some 20 km (12 miles) to the west of the frontier with Poland. Here, for almost thirty years, he worked, living in a former presbytery with his second wife, the sculptor Sylvia Hagen. From this marriage their son Carl-Hagen Stötzer was born in 1978.

- "What lies within me is neither Heaven nor Hell. It is humanity."
- „Mein Inhalt ist weder der Himmel noch die Hölle, es ist der Mensch.“

Werner Stötzer 2010

== Awards and honours ==
- 1962 Will Lammert Prize from the (East) German Academy of Arts
- 1975 Käthe Kollwitz Prize from the (East) German Academy of Arts
- 1977 National Prize of East Germany
- 1986 National Prize of East Germany
- 1994 Ernst Rietschel Arts Prize for Sculpture
- 2008 Brandenburg Arts Prize
- 2009 Honorary citizenship of the Town of Seelow

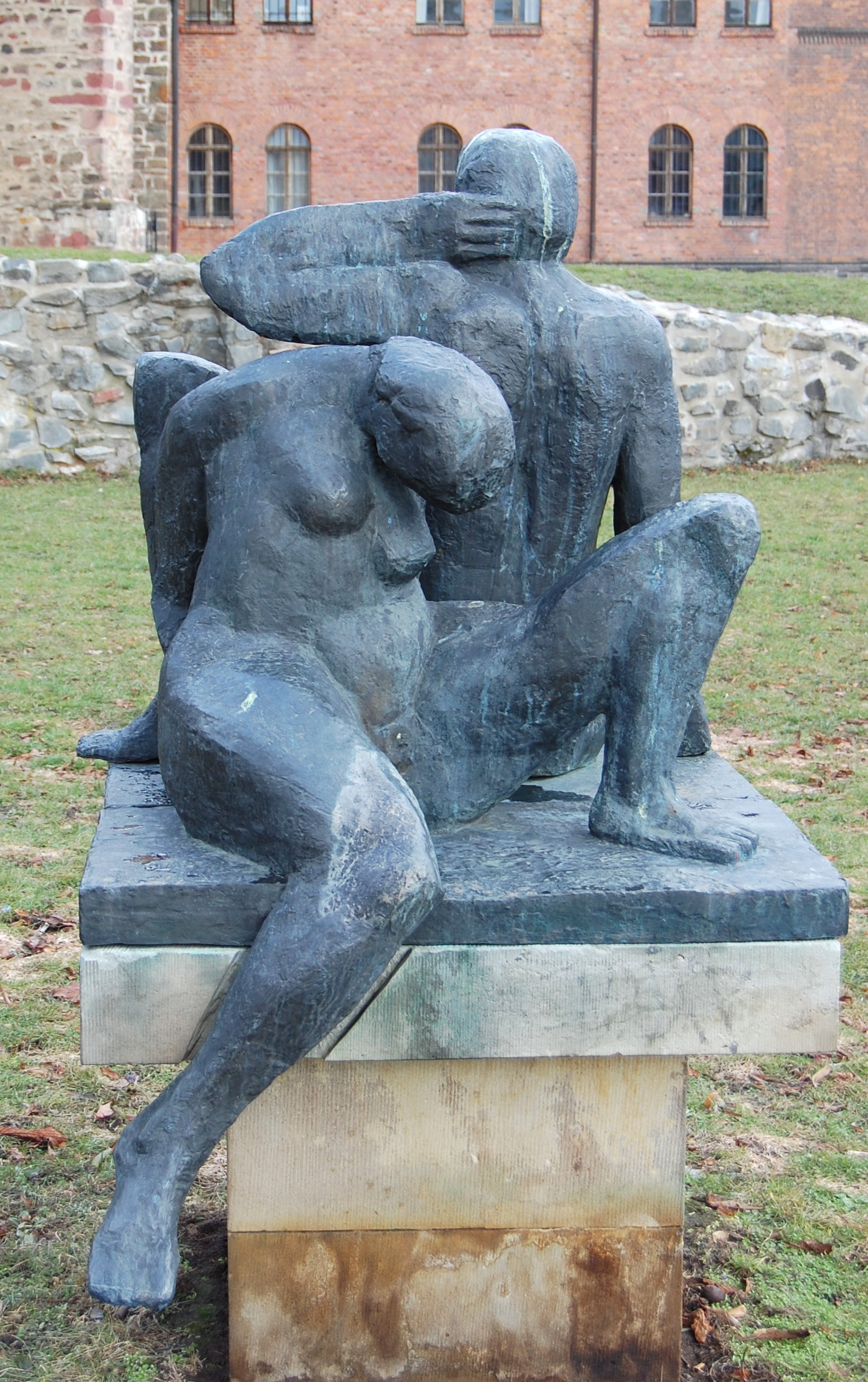
Werra and Saale (1982-84)

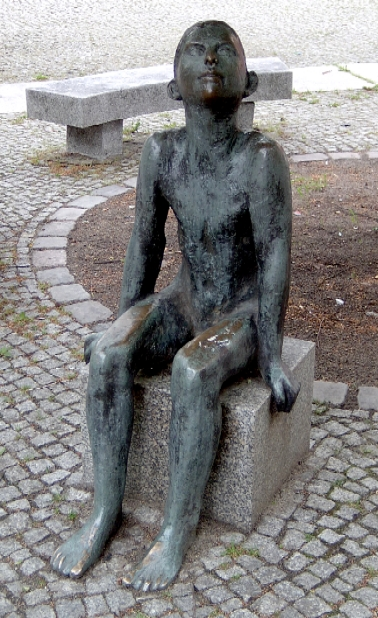
Boy sitting (1956)

== Selected works ==
- 1956 Sitzender Junge, Bronze
- 1959/60 Fragen eines lesenden Arbeiters und Lesender Arbeiter in the courtyard of the Berlin State Library, Unter den Linden, Bronzerelief
- 1963 Portrait of Gerhard Kettner, Bronze bust
- 1965 Grieving women, Marble relief
- 1966-1968 Bronze door for the Our Lady Monastery, Magdeburg
- 1967 Babi Jar, Relief and Lithography
- 1970 Draft Bronze door for the St Thomas's Church in Erfurt
- 1972 Auschwitz group, Marble
- 1980 Stage sets and mask for Electra at the German Theatre, Berlin
- 1981 Große Sitzende (Internationales Bildhauersymposion Formen für Europa – Formen aus Stein in Syke)
- 1982–84 Saale and Werra, Sculpture Park, Magdeburg
- 1985-86 Marble Relief wall Alte Welt for the Marx-Engels-Forum in Berlin-Mitte
- 1986–87 Mother and child
- 1988 Gypsey woman from Marzahn
- 1995 Torso (für Eberhard Roters)
- 1996 Fliehende (Flying)
- 1996 Undine
- 2002 Liegende (reclining)
- 2010 Torso, leicht gedreht (Torso, turned slightly)

== Selected exhibitions ==
- 1960 Berlin, Staatliche Museen zu Berlin, National Gallery (Berlin)
- 1963 Magdeburg, Kulturhistorisches Museum (zusammen mit Gerhard Kettner)
- 1964 Altenburg, Greifswald, Stralsund, Erfurt
- 1965 Wien, Galerie "ZB" (zusammen mit Gerhard Kettner)
- 1970 Potsdam
- 1972 Leipzig, Dresden
- 1979 Rostock, Galerie am Boulevard
- 1982 Ravensburg
- 1986 Bremen, Gerhard-Marcks-Haus
- 1995 Zürich, World Trade Center
- 1996 Lago Maggiore, Via Gambarone
- 1998 Frankfurt am Main, Galerie Schwind
- 1999 Duisburg, Wilhelm Lehmbruck Museum
- 2000 Düsseldorf, Galerie Beethovenstraße
- 2001 Berlin, Galerie Leo Coppi
- 2002 Berlin, galerie+edition refugium
- 2003 Frankfurt am Main, Galerie Schwind
- 2004 Bremen, „Sich dem Stein stellen“, Gerhard-Marcks-Haus
- 2005 Dresden, Galerie Beyer
- 2005 Leipzig, Galerie Schwind
- 2006 Berlin, Academy of Arts (Berlin), „Märkische Steine“
- 2006 Dresden, Leonhardi-Museum, „Wegzeichen“
- 2006 Berlin, Galerie LEO.COPPI
- 2009 Frankfurt am Main, Galerie Schwind
- 2013 Hamburg, Open-Air-Schau Figur als Widerstand am Jungfernstieg (zusammen mit Alfred Hrdlicka and Bernd Stöcker)
