= Weimar City Museum =

Museum in Weimar, Germany

- Stadtmuseum Weimar
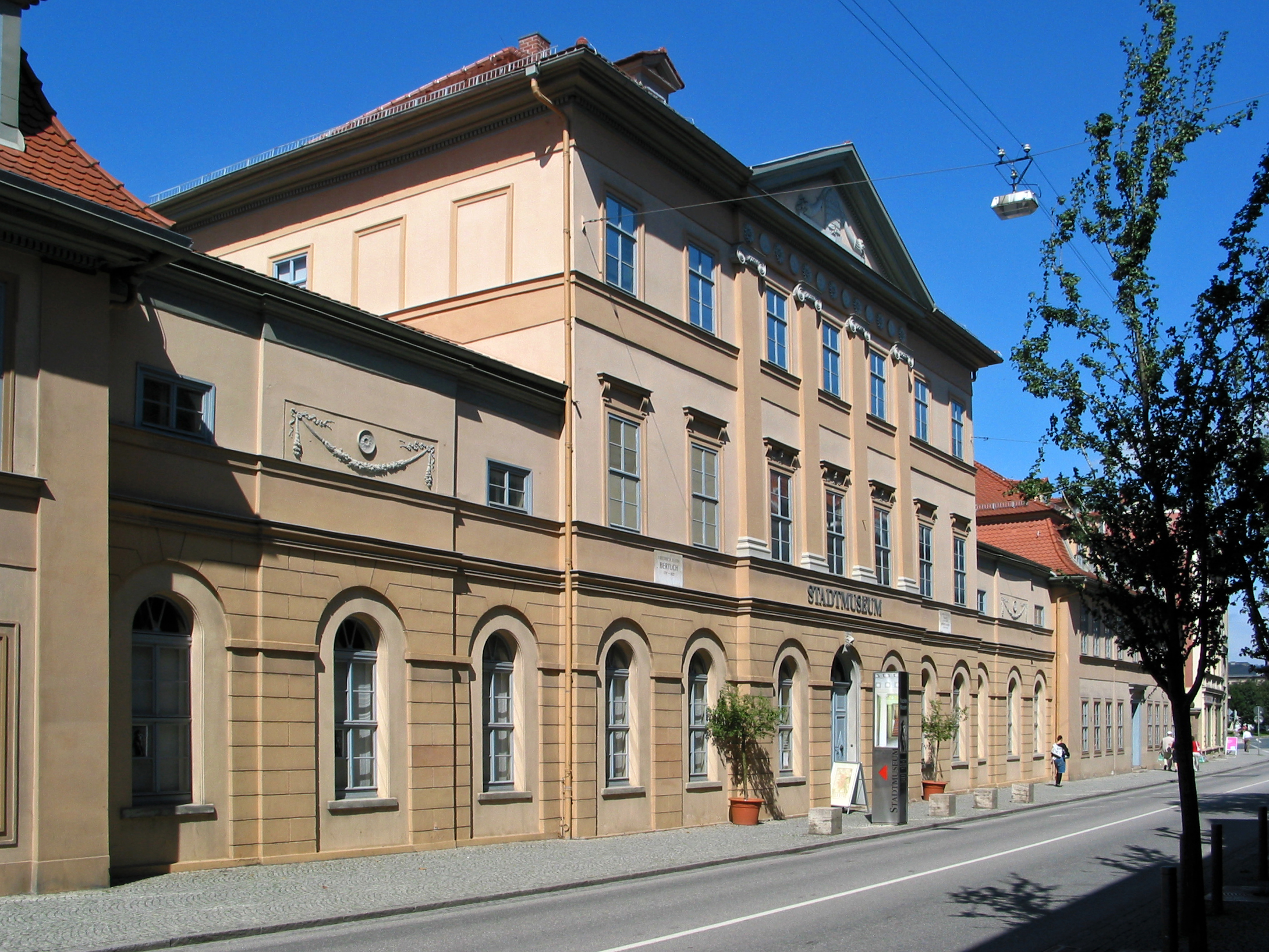
- Coordinates: 50°58′59″N 11°19′31″E
- Director: Alf Rößner
- Website: stadtmuseum.weimar.de

The Weimar City Museum (German: Stadtmuseum Weimar) is a museum in Weimar, Germany. It is the oldest museum of Thuringia and is located at Karl-Liebknecht-Straße 5.

== History ==
The museum originated in 19th-century private collections such as those of Bruno Schwabe. It was formally founded on 24 June 1889 as the Naturwissenschaftliches Museum (Natural Science Museum) under the management of the Naturwissenschaftlichen Gesellschaft (Natural Science Society). It was located in four rooms of the school behind the Stadtkirche (now the Volkshochschule). By 1892 it had run out of space and moved into the Poseck’sche Haus, now the Museum for the Prehistory and Early History of Thuringia, also set up by the society. When it was taken over by the city council in 1903 it became the first city museum in Thuringia. It was closed from 2000 to 2005. It also runs the German Bee Museum and since 2006 the Kunsthalle "Harry Graf Kessler" at Goetheplatz 9b. It also co-runs the Fotoarchiv Weimar with the city archives.

== Building ==
The building in which it is housed was built in two phases in 1780-1782 and 1799-1803 as a neoclassical residential and commercial building. It was named the Bertuchhaus after Friedrich Justin Bertuch (1747–1822), for whom it was built. In the first two-year phase built a home and commercial premises for Bertruch, now the north wing. In the second phase the Weimar architect Johann Christian Heinrich Schlüter designed and built the middle range.

In a letter to his friend Christian Gottfried Körner, Friedrich Schiller called the building the most beautiful one in the whole of Weimar, as well as giving a detailed description of it, the garden behind it and its usage.

The building formerly housed the Landes-Industrie-Comptoir or Geographische Institut (Geographical Institute), before housing the museum from 1955 onwards. Behind it were workshops forming a four-sided courtyard, used by figures such as Christiane Vulpius and which were demolished to build the Weimarhalle in 1928.

== Displays ==
Covering all of Weimar's history, it focusses on prehistory, early history, publishing history, business history, the Weimar Republic, the art of Alfred Ahner and watch making, alongside a nationally-important textile collection. A temporary exhibition in 2016 looked at the VEB Uhrenwerk Weimar.

== Directors ==
1. Paul Kaiser (1953-1983)
2. Rainer Wagner (1983-1990)
3. Walter Steiner (1991-2000)
4. Alf Rößner (2006-present)
