= Jo Mihaly =

German dancer and writer

Elfriede Alice "Piete" Kuhr (1902–1989), known professionally as Jo Mihaly, was a German dancer and writer.

== Early years and war diary ==
Kuhr grew up in Schneidemühl (now Piła), then about 80 miles from the German-Russian border, now in Poland. The town was the site of a World War I prisoner of war camp, and Kuhr's rediscovered adolescent diary was published late in her life as Da gibt's ein Wiedersehn (1982). It has been translated into English by Walter Wright, a pacifist and former conscientious objector, under the title There we'll meet again, a young German girl's diary of the first world war. It gives an unusual insight into German experience of the war: 'The fact that the diary is written by a German teenager does make it unusual. The fact that this teenager went on to oppose war, to dance her anti-war message on the Berlin stage, to marry a Jew, and to be forced to flee Germany in 1933, gives an added poignancy to the diary.'

== Expressionist Dancer ==
Jo Mihaly started as a dancer in 1923. In 1933 she was well known for an anti-war dance she had devised with the World War I military boots, sword and helmet. She belonged to the German expressionist dancers of the 30s, along with Mary Wigman, Rudolf von Laban, Gertrud Bodenwieser and Gret Palucca. She was an opponent of the persecution of Jews, fleeing Germany for Zürich in 1933 to escape being taken to a concentration camp like so many of her activist socialist friends. She continued to dance there from 1934 to 1938.

== Novelist ==
Mihaly started by contributing articles and poems to the magazine of the Brotherhood of Wayfarers around 1925, and met editor Gregor Gog in 1927. She then wrote her first novel, Michael Arpad und sein Kind, a novel about a gypsy family. She wrote another novel in 1938, "Gesucht: Stepan Varesku". She wrote other books but only her World War I diary has been translated into English.

== Media portrayal ==
Elfriede Kuhr is one of the 14 main characters of the series 14 - Diaries of the Great War. She is played by actress Elisa Monse.

== Notes ==
- Biographical notes in There we'll meet again
- L'espace qui crie en moi - Hommage à la danse expressionniste allemande, a 1991 documentary.
- Petra Josting: ‚Zigeuner‘ in der Kinder- und Jugendliteratur der Weimarer Republik am Beispiel von Jo Mihalys ‚Michael Arpad und sein Kind. Ein Kinderschicksal auf der Landstraße’ (1930). In: Petra Josting/Walter Fähnders (Ed.): "Laboratorium Vielseitigkeit". Zur Literatur der Weimarer Republik. Festschrift für Helga Karrenbrock zum 60. Geburtstag. Bielefeld: Aisthesis, 2005 ISBN 3-89528-546-3 (D)
