= Gregor Gog =

Gog at the Vagabond Congress in 1929

Gregor Ambrosius Gog (1891–1945) was a German anarchist, writer, and activist. He is most known for his founding of the Vagabond Movement, which advocated for the rights of a dissident culture of anarchists, syndicalists, and various other forms of social outcasts during the German Weimar Republic. He also established one of Germany's earliest street newspapers and was regarded as the "King of Vagabonds." His writing defied social norms and highlighted the struggles of the homeless and disenfranchised in the Interwar Period.

== Early life ==
Gog was born in the German town of Schwerin an der Wartke (now Skwierzyna, Western Poland) on 7 November 1891. He was encouraged to become a priest by his mother and spent four years as an altar boy in his early youth.

The son of a carpenter, Gog left home to join the military at the age of 18. In 1909, he went into the Imperial German Merchant Marine but deserted in 1913 to become a gardener. After the outbreak of the Great War, Gog was drafted into the military for a second time. During the war, he encountered underground anarchist groups, which heavily influenced his politics and led to his being court-martialed twice. He was ultimately charged with the spread of anti-militarist propaganda and incitement to mutiny before a military court, leading to his psychiatric institutionalization during which he developed kidney disease due to poor care. He was court-martialed a second time and discharged from the military as unfit for service.

After the war, Gog traveled to Brazil and then moved to Bad Urach, where he established a commune, Kommune am Grünen Weg, which became a home for anarchists, radical preachers, and communists. The political and economic instability of Weimar Germany created a wellspring of revolutionary thinking, which helped to reinforce his anti-authoritarian stance and activism.

== Vagabond Movement ==
During the 1920s, Gog founded the Vagabond Movement (Vagabundenbewegung), which sought to create a sense of community and solidarity among homeless individuals, wanderers, and those who rejected mainstream society. He promoted self-sufficiency and freedom from material constraints, organized gatherings and fostered a distinct vagabond identity. His leadership earned him the moniker of the "King of Vagabonds." The Vagabond Movement had limited impact on the broader anarcho-syndicalist movement, and Gog organized them into the “International Fraternity of the Vagabonds” in 1927.

Gog and his followers held congresses, such as the 1929 Vagabond Congress in Stuttgart, where they discussed political strategies and the cultural significance of vagabond life. Over six hundred assorted tramps and vagabonds came to Stuttgart to answer Gog's call, and prominent authors Sinclair Lewis and Maksim Gorky expressed support for the congress. In critiquing the romanticism of the destitute and rejection of Weimar capitalist norms, the congress advocated for a lifestyle unbound by property and societal expectations. They considered conscientiously refusing wage labour as the most effective resistance of capitalism, adopting the motto "General strike for life!" They used art, literature, and direct action to challenge state oppression and to redefine homelessness as a conscious choice rather than a social failure. While the movement was largely anarchist, it also attracted bohemians, political dissidents, and others who felt that they were disillusioned with Weimar Germany. Gog himself also gained some celebrity as director Fritz Weiss produced a silent film detailing Gog and his life.

=== Der Kunde ===
Also in 1929, Gog took over editorship of Der Kunde, a street newspaper founded by Gustav Brügel in 1927. The paper was a platform for vagabond voices and critiques of social injustices. Through his writing, he addressed issues such as poverty, homelessness, and state repression, positioning vagabonds not as social outcasts but as a unique culture with a distinct political consciousness. Der Kunde became the movement’s primary mouthpiece, disseminating radical ideas and providing a space for vagabonds to share their experiences. Contributors included Jo Mihàly and Hans Tombrock.

== Later years, death, and legacy ==
Gog’s activism made him a target of state authorities, especially as the political climate in Germany shifted in the 1930s. The movement faced increasing repression under the Nazi regime, which viewed vagabonds as subversive elements to be eliminated. With the rise of Adolf Hitler to Chancellor and his takeover of the German government, Gog became a target due to his anarchist beliefs and activism. Gog saw his vagabond movement as a resistance to the burgeoning Nazi movement, aligning himself with the German communist KPD to work against fascists and alienating many vagabond allies in the process.

In April 1933, Gog was arrested by the Gestapo and sent to Heuberg concentration camp as well as camps in Reutlingen, and Ulm. Gog managed to escape the camp and fled to Switzerland before being expelled in June 1934 because of his controversial politics. Gog then fled to Fergana, then part of the Soviet Union, where he was drafted to perform forced labor. After his release, he began work on a novel about the Battle of Stalingrad, which would go unpublished.

On 8 October 1945, Gog died of kidney disease in a sanatorium in Tashkent. After his death, his ideas continued to inspire counterculture and anarchist movements, and his legacy lives on in discussions about homelessness, political activism, artistic expression, and alternate ways of living.

In 2014, Stuttgart's Theater Rampe staged a reenactment of the 1929 Vagabond congress. In addition, Der König der Vagabunden, a graphic novel retelling Gog's life written by Patrick Spät and drawn by Beatrice Davies, was published by Avant Verlag in October 2019 and selected as a Finalist for the Leibinger Stiftung Comic book Prize 2019.
