= Eva Schulze-Knabe =

German painter

- Self portrait, 1957
- Born: Eva Knabe; 11 May 1907; Pirna, German Empire
- Died: 15 July 1976 (aged 69); Dresden, East Germany
- Resting place: Heidefriedhof, Dresden
- Known for: Painting
- Movement: Expressionism, Socialist Realism
- Spouse: Fritz Schulze (m. 1931)

Eva Schulze-Knabe (11 May 1907 – 15 July 1976) was a German painter and graphic artist, as well as a resistance fighter against the Third Reich.

== Biography ==
Born in Pirna, Saxony, Eva Schulze-Knabe studied from 1924 to 1926 in Leipzig and from 1928 to 1932 at the Dresden Art Academy. From 1929 she was a member of the artists' group ASSO, and from 1931 she was a member of the Communist Party of Germany (KPD). The same year, she married the artist Fritz Schulze.

She was arrested in 1933 and 1934 and confined at Hohnstein concentration camp. She was arrested again 1941 and in 1942, she and her husband were tried before the Volksgerichtshof at Münchner Platz in Dresden, where she was sentenced to life in labour prison (Zuchthaus). Her husband was sentenced to death and executed.

After being freed from Waldheim labour prison in 1945, she lived as a freelancer in Dresden and received Dresden's Martin Andersen Nexö Art Prize in 1959. Moreover, she oversaw the painting and drawing circle founded in 1948 at the Sachsenwerk (a factory) in Niedersedlitz (part of Dresden). The Demokratischer Frauenbund Deutschlands (Democratic Women's Association of Germany, an East German organization), Group 540, bore her name.

She had a daughter, Tina, whose portrait she painted in 1961.

She died in Dresden in 1976 and is buried at the Heidefriedhof municipal cemetery. A memorial to her and her husband exists at Hoher Stein in Dresden.

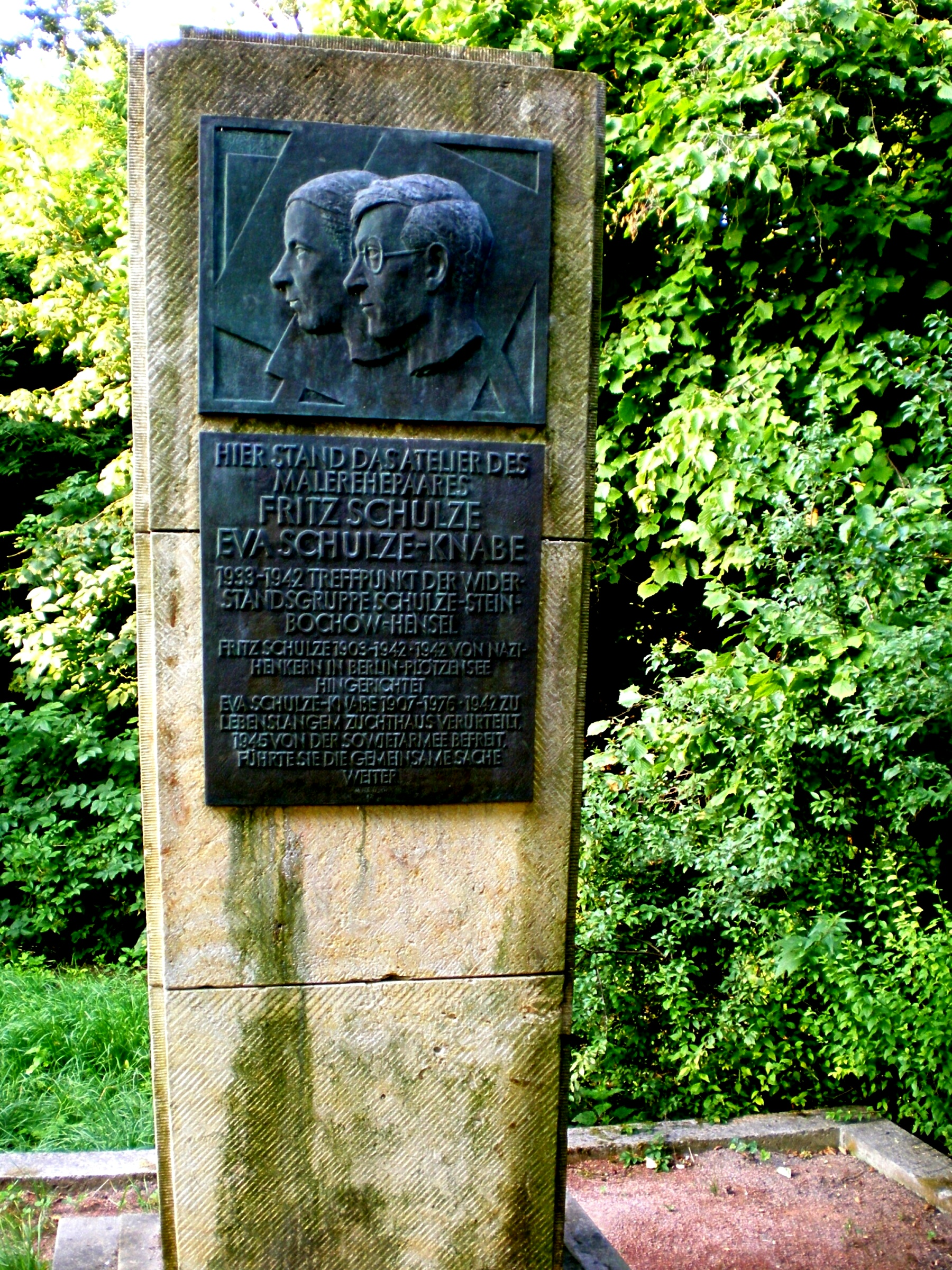
Memorial at the site of the Schulzes' studio
