= Otto Nagel =

German painter and graphic designer

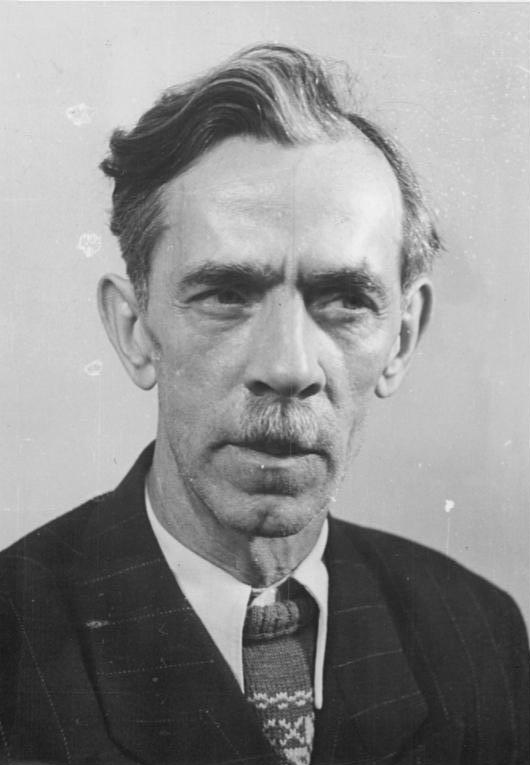
- Nagel in 1950
- Born: 27 September 1894; Berlin-Wedding, Germany
- Died: 12 July 1967 (aged 72); Berlin-Biesdorf, East Germany
- Occupation: Painter
- Political party: Socialist Unity Party of Germany
- Spouse: Valentina Nikitina

Otto Nagel (27 September 1894 – 12 July 1967) was a German painter, graphic designer and long-time head of the Berlin Academy of Arts who was one of the most prolific artists of East Germany.

== Life ==
Born at Berlin-Wedding, Nagel was the son of a carpenter and social democrat. After completing his basic schooling, he briefly entered into an apprenticeship with a stained glass painter, but soon broke this off. In 1912 he joined the Social Democratic Party. He was a conscientious objector during the First World War and was imprisoned for refusing to serve. After the war he first began to paint after being exposed to the work of August Macke. He gradually became a staunch communist, joining the Communist Party of Germany in 1920. Throughout the 1920s he was very active in the Berlin art scene, becoming acquainted with Käthe Kollwitz, El Lissitzky, and many other notables. He became secretary of the Workers International Relief, and in 1922 he co-founded the "Artist's Relief" division thereof with Erwin Piscator. In 1924, Nagel joined the Red Group in Berlin and

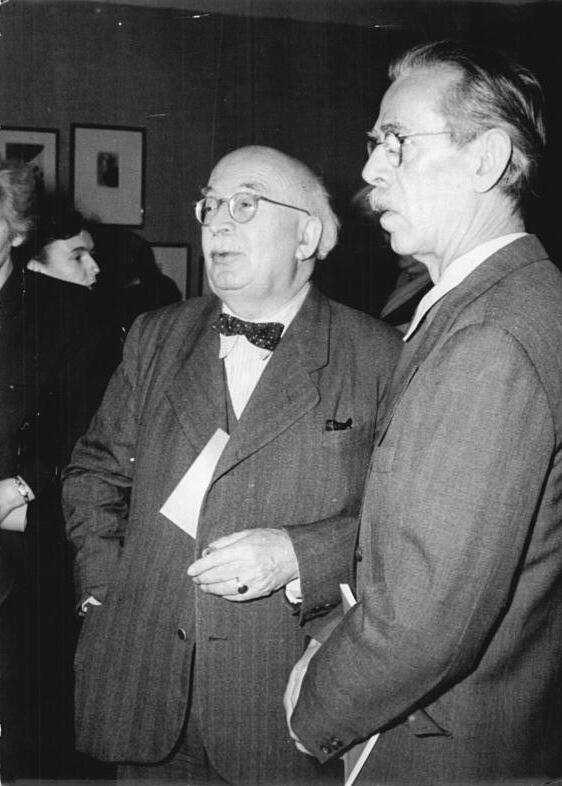
Arnold Zweig and Nagel in 1955

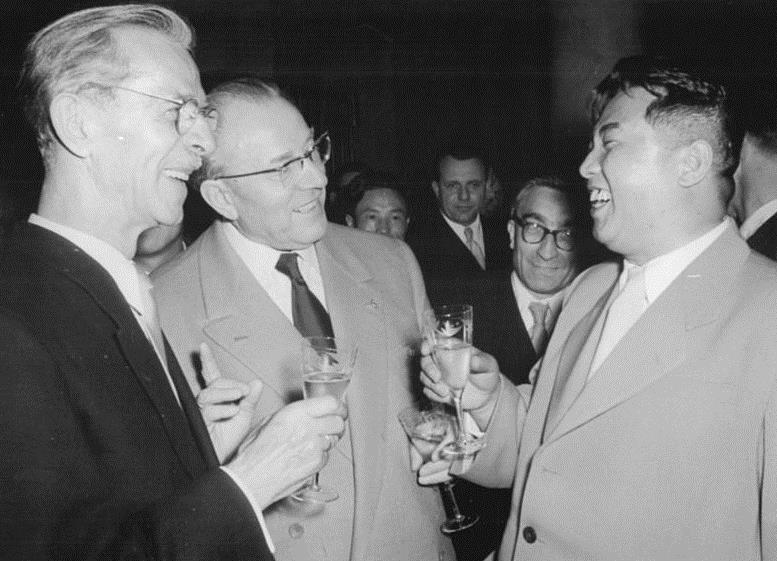
Nagel in 1956, with Otto Grotewohl and Kim Il Sung.

accompanied an exhibition of young artists to the Soviet Union. He was close friends with Heinrich Zille and Käthe Kollwitz, whose estate he later handled. Through Nagel, numerous writings about her work have been published. In 1925 he married the Russian singer-actress Valentina ("Walli") Nikitina. From 1928 to 1931, he joined the November Group and was a co-founder of the Association of Revolutionary Visual Artists. From 1928 to 1932, he was publisher and editor-in-chief of the satirical magazine Eulenspiegel.

In 1933, Nagel was elected chairman of the National Association of Visual Artists of Germany, but the election was annulled by the Nazis the next day. When the Nazis seized power, much of Nagel's work was declared degenerate. He was forbidden to paint, and from 1936 to 1937 he was incarcerated in various Nazi concentration camps, including Sachsenhausen.

After the end of the Second World War, Nagel lived and worked in Bergholz-Rehbrücke in Potsdam, Brandenburg, later part of East Germany. In 1945, he was one of the co-founders of the Cultural Association of the GDR. In 1952, he moved to Berlin-Biesdorf. From 1956 to 1962, he was the president of the DDR Academy of Arts, Berlin. He died at Berlin-Biesdorf in 1967 and was honoured with an Ehrengrab in Berlin's Friedrichsfelde Cemetery. In 1970, he was posthumously made an honorary citizen of Berlin.

There is a secondary school named for Nagel in Berlin-Biesdorf.

== Sources ==
- Erhard Frommhold: Otto Nagel. Zeit, Leben, Werk, Berlin, 1974
- Wolfgang Hütt: Welt der Kunst – Otto Nagel, Henschelverlag. Kunst und Gesellschaft, Berlin, 1984
- Sepp Kern. "Nagel, Otto." In Grove Art Online. Oxford Art Online, (accessed 31 December 2011; subscription required).
- Heinz Lüdecke: Künstler der Gegenwart 1 – Otto Nagel, VEB Verlag der Kunst, Dresden, 1959
- Gerhard Pommeranz-Liedtke: Otto Nagel und Berlin, VEB Verlag der Kunst, Dresden, 1964
