= Józef Sandel =

Polish art historian and critic

Józef Sandel (Yiddish: יוסף סאנדעל; German: Josef Sandel; 29 September 1894, Kolomea – 1 December 1962, Warsaw) was a Polish art historian and critic, an art dealer and collector, and an advocate on behalf of Jewish artists in postwar Poland.

== Biography ==
Sandel was born in Kolomea (Kolomyia, Ukraine), then in Galicia, in the Austro-Hungarian Empire. The son of a cap maker, he attended the Baron Hirsch school and then gymnasium.

Around 1920, he moved to Dresden, Germany, where, in 1925, he co-published a short-lived German-language literary and art magazine, Mob: Zeitschrift der Jungen (Mob: Journal of youths). He subsequently lived in France, Switzerland, and Austria, before returning to Dresden.

From 1929 to 1933, he operated an art gallery in Dresden, called Galerie junge Kunst (Gallery of young art). After the rise of the National Socialist regime in Germany, he moved to Belgrade (then in Yugoslavia), where he opened another gallery and mounted exhibitions, in 1933-1934.

In 1935, he moved to Poland; he spent time in Vilna (Vilnius) and Warsaw, and published articles on art in Yiddish-language periodicals, including Literarishe Bleter. At the outbreak of the Second World War he fled to the Soviet Union, and survived the war in Kazakhstan, where he taught German in a middle school.

After the war, he returned to Poland and settled in Warsaw, in 1946. There he became the leader of the Jewish Society for the Promotion of Fine Arts; Yiddish: Yidishe gezelshaft tsu farshpreytn kunst), or ZTKSP, a revival of an organization that had been active in Poland before the war. The Society provided material assistance to Jewish artists, helped to promote their work, and fostered art education for Jewish youth. It mounted some 98 exhibitions in Warsaw, and four exhibitions that were presented throughout Poland – two devoted to the work of individual artists, Rafael Mandelzweig, in 1946, and Lea Grundig, in 1949; and two, in 1948, in honor of the fifth anniversary of the Warsaw Ghetto Uprising, featuring works of Jewish artists who were killed in the Holocaust.

After the dissolution of the ZTKSP, in September 1949, the art works that Sandel and his colleagues had assembled were integrated into the collections of the Jewish Historical Institute, Warsaw. From 1950 to 1953 the institute operated a Gallery of Jewish Art, with Sandel serving as director.

Sandel subsequently devoted himself to the writing of several art historical works concerning Jewish artists in Poland. Among his works, all written in Yiddish, is a two-volume biographical reference work on Jewish artists who perished during the Holocaust in Poland, Umgekumene yidishe kinstler in Poylen (Jewish artists in Poland who perished, Warsaw, 1957).

== Personal life ==
Sandel married Ernestyna Podhorizer (1903-1984), who was also originally from Galicia and worked for a time as the secretary of the ZTKSP. Sandel-Podhorizer was born in Dembits (Dębica), and before the war had been a biology teacher in Lemberg (Lviv); she was later a curator at the museum of the Jewish Historical Institute, and also worked at the Biology Institute in Warsaw.
