= Alfred Ahner (painter) =

German painter and designer

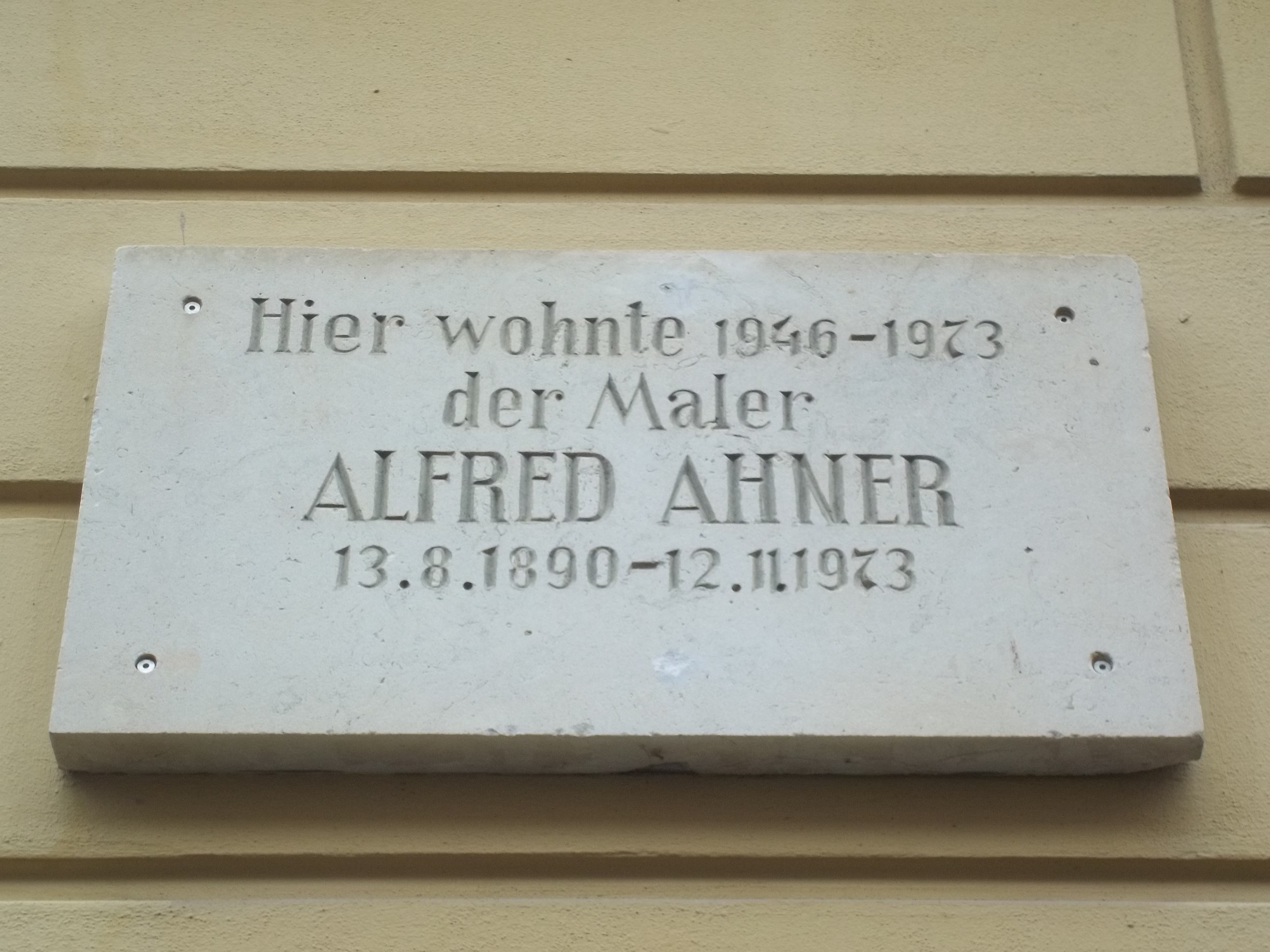
Plaque in memory of Alfred Ahner in Weimar, Thomas-Müntzer-Straße 22

Alfred Ahner (13 August 1890 - 12 November 1973) was a German painter and designer.

== Life ==
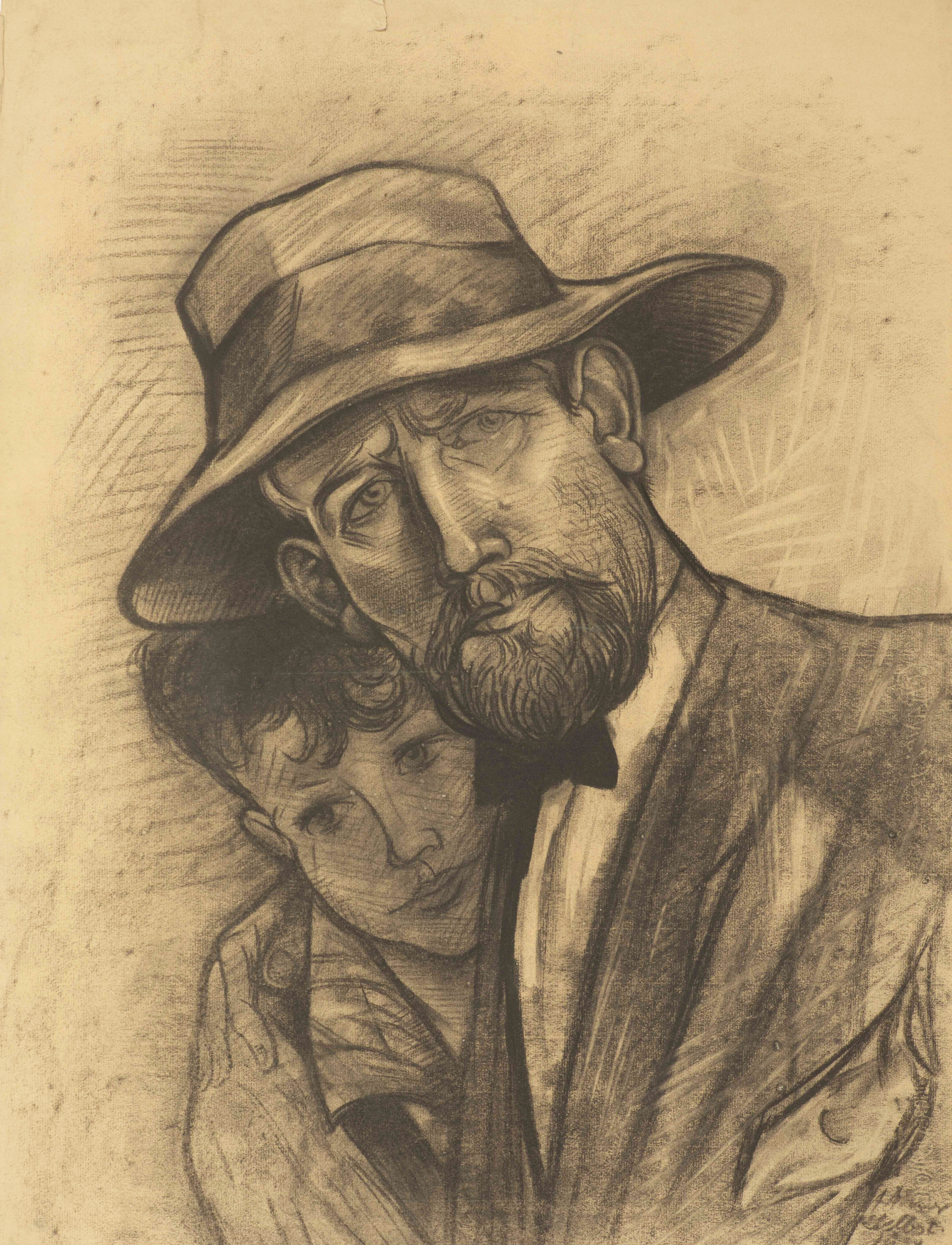
"Self-Portrait with Karl-Hermann“, 1934, chalk

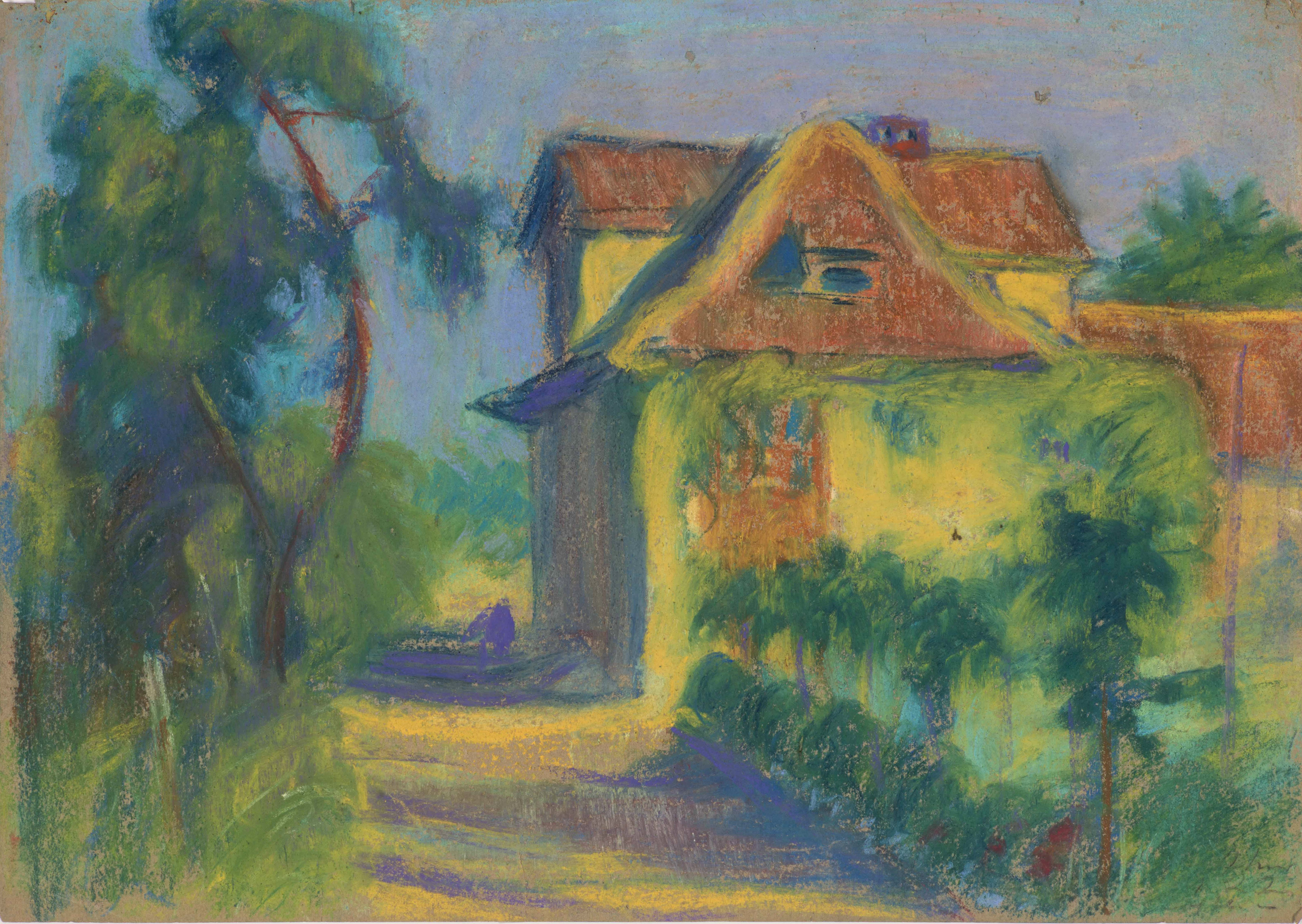
"Gärtnerhäuschen in Froriepsche Park – My First Home“, 1922, pastel

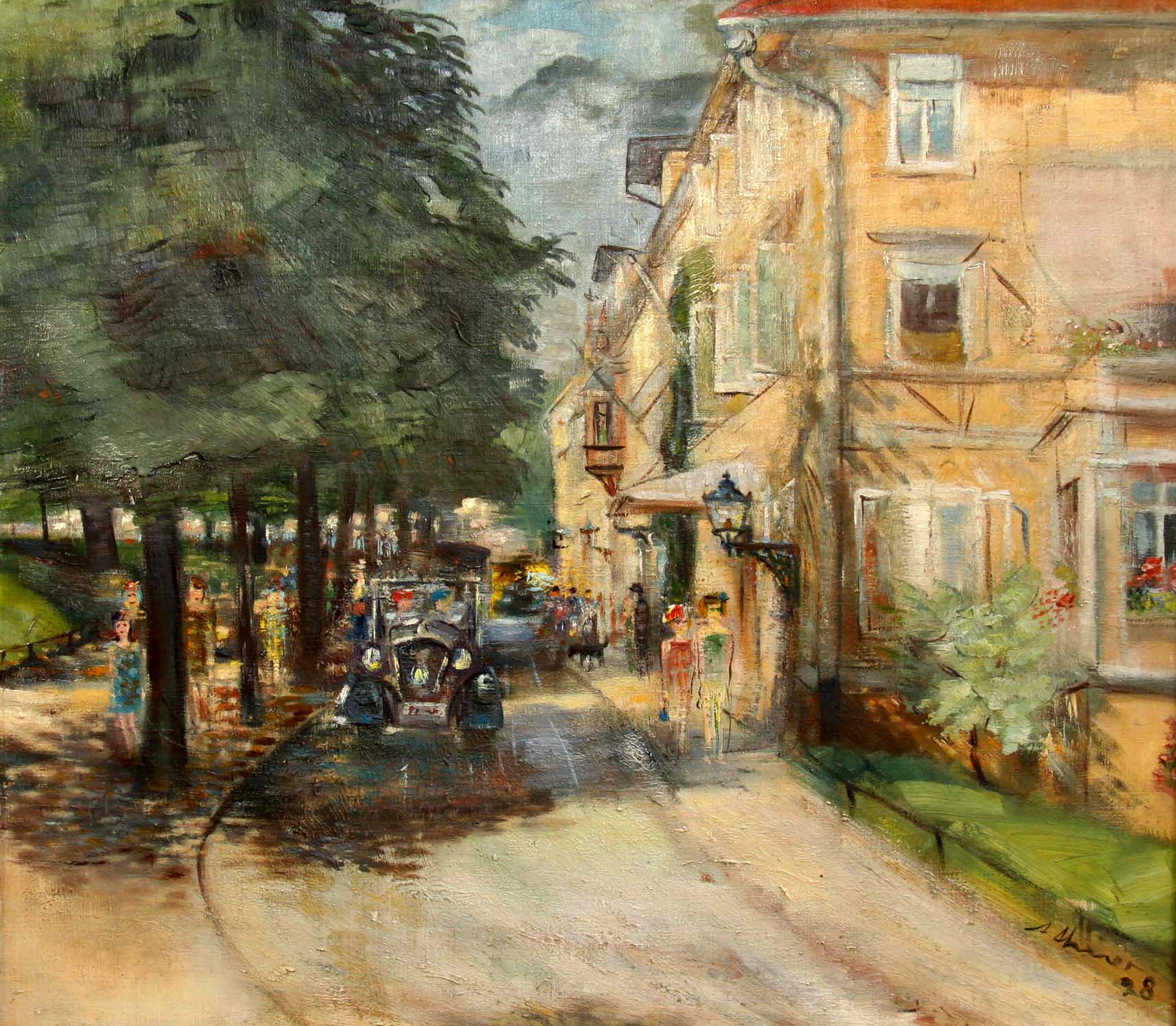
"Ackerwand Weimar“, 1928, oil on canvas

Born in Wintersdorf, he took an apprenticeship in lithography in Gera from 1905 to 1910 before working as a lithographer. Drawing classes at Sunday school in Gera brought him into contact with Otto Dix and Kurt Günther. From 1911 to 1913 he studied in Munich at a private school run by Wladimir Magidey (born 1881) and at the Akademie der bildenden Künste under Peter Halm and Carl Johann Becker-Gundahl. During this period he met Erich Mühsam, Frank Wedekind and Roda Roda.

In 1913 and 1914 Ahner studied at the Kgl. Akademie der bildenden Künste in Stuttgart under professors Heinrich Altherr and Adolf Hölzel, until the First World War put an abrupt end to his education and turned him into a medical orderly in the army on the Western Front. There Ahner artistically captured what he saw and what moved him: doctors, dogs carrying medical supplies, exploding grenades, transporting the wounded, superiors, comrades, villages, landscapes and French children and villagers. Between 1914 and 1919 he created around 170 drawings and sketches of such subjects. After the First World War, he worked as a pump attendant in the brown coal mine in his hometown of Wintersdorf and joined the KPD.

From 1922 until his death, he lived and worked as a freelance artist in Weimar, where he also died, and became close friends with the Gera painter Alexander Wolfgang. From 1924 to 1933 he was a constant visitor to the Thuringian Landtag, where he created around a hundred drawings of ministers, representatives, visitors and employees. From the Nazi seizure of power in 1933 until the end of the Second World War he went into 'internal emigration', only exhibiting once during that time, in a show with Johanna Salzmann organised by the Thuringian Exhibition Association of Visual Artists in Weimar in 1940. He continued several satirical and mocking works such as the watercolour Street Scene, which was confiscated from the Weimar Castle Museum by the Nazi authorities in 1937 as 'degenerate art'.

He was conscripted as an army medical orderly again in 1944-1945 and after the war his inner circle of friends in Weimar included Dora Wentscher and Johannes Nohl. At that time his work inspired the painters and miniaturists Gerhard Bätz and Manfred Kiedorf, who began their careers in the 1950s. The new German Democratic Republic required artists to portray working people and in that context in 1952 Ahner began working with his fellow painters Erwin Görlach, Gerhard Ströch and Martin Spröte (1916–1977) at the newly founded Agricultural Production Cooperative in Merxleben. He also went to make studies in the lignite-mining area in Meuselwitz.

=== Marriage and issue ===
Alfred Ahner married the horticulture teacher Erna Oschatz. His two children, Karl-Hermann and Maria-Erika, were born in 1923 and 1925. Their son died in Russia in the Second World War at the age of 20.

=== Honours ===
- 1960: Goethe Medal and Schiller Medal of the City of Weimar
- 1962: Honorary citizenship of Wintersdorf
- 1971: Johannes-R.-Becher-Medaille

== Oeuvre ==
In dealing with war and fascism, Ahner created shocking works. Many of them portrayed open-cast lignite mining, which characterised his homeland in east Thuringia. In addition to his unique portraits of adults and children, views of towns and cities, landscapes and still lives, throughout his life he was a frequent visitor to coffee shops, portraying them in paintings, diary entries and poems. He was continually captivated by the special milieu of cafés and bars. In them he produced a large number of masterful sketches and drawings, permeated with the joy of life, sometimes subtle irony and also open protest and criticism of society. His portraits and scenes of everyday life are valuable contemporary historical documents of great artistic importance. In Weimar, his preference for motifs from everyday life soon led to him being called a “street painter”.

Whether in watercolor, pastel, drawing, lithography or oil painting, his street and café house scenes, landscapes and portraits always showed him to be an incorruptible chronicler of changing times and many socio-political events. He often added humorous notes to his sketches, sometimes rhyming in Morgenstern's style, which further reinforces his works' reportage-like character. Ahner also produced scenes of animals, circus life and religion. Ahner left copious diary entries which are preserved with the rest of his written estate at the Sächsischen Landesbibliothek – Staats- und Universitätsbibliothek Dresden since the 1980s.

In July 2008 the artist's daughter, who had spent her life promoting and preserving her father's works, founded the Alfred-Ahner-Stiftung, a foundation based in Weimar owning around 5,500 of his works. Most of the foundation's works are stored in the Weimar City Museum and the Thüringer Freilichtmuseum Hohenfelden, though around 200 of them are on loan to the Thuringian State Parliament in Erfurt, the Buchenwald Memorial and other sites.

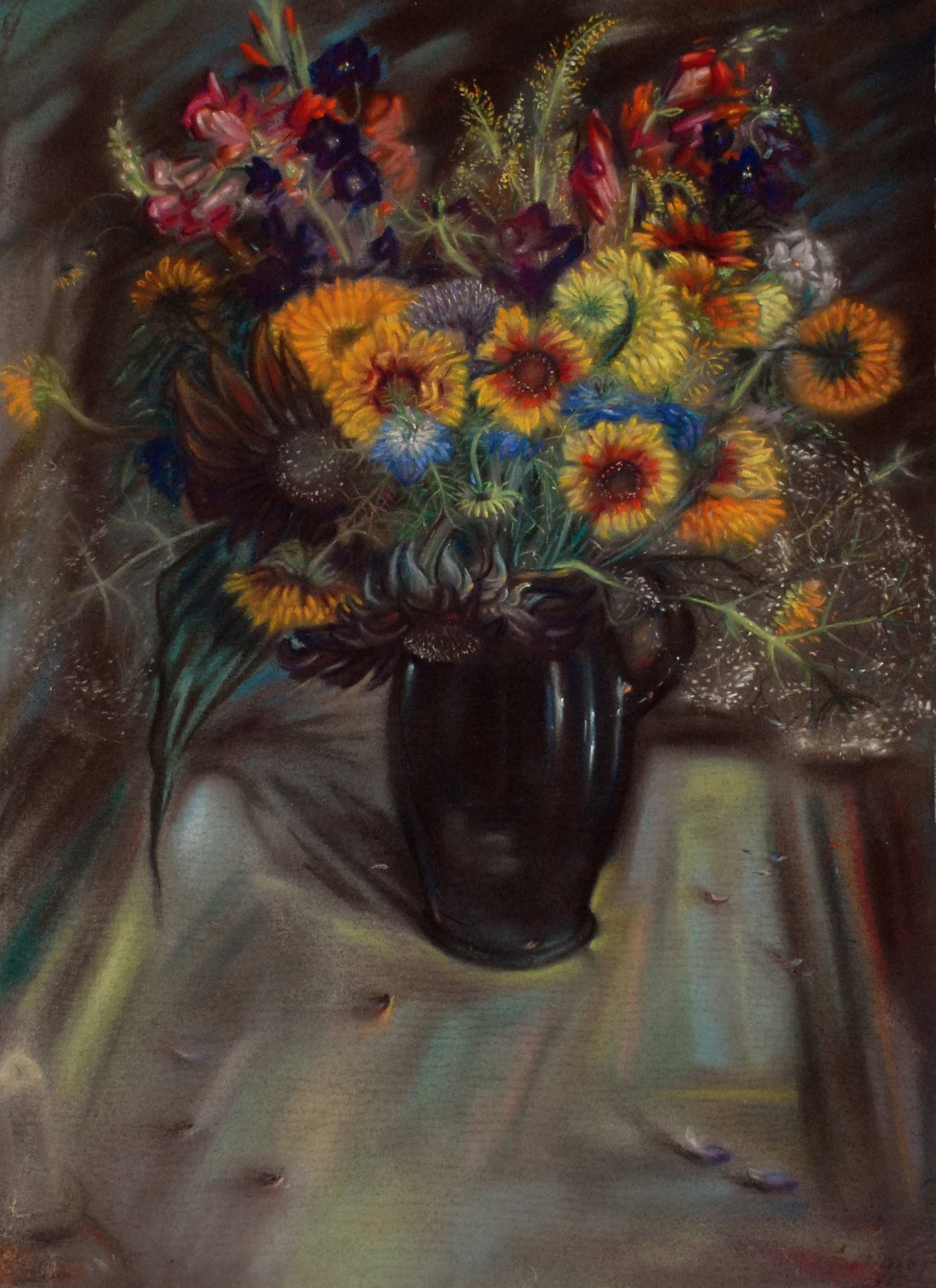
"Bouquet of Flowers", 1940, pastel

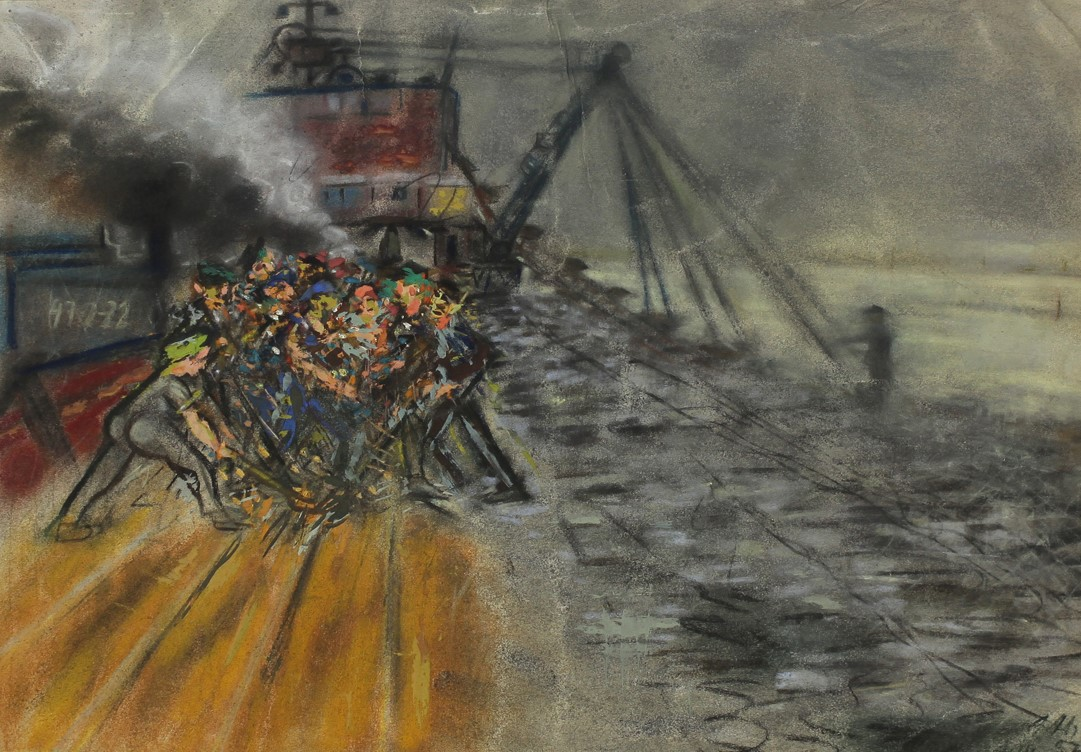
"Workers with a Deep Excavator near Wintersdorf“, 1957, pastel, tempera

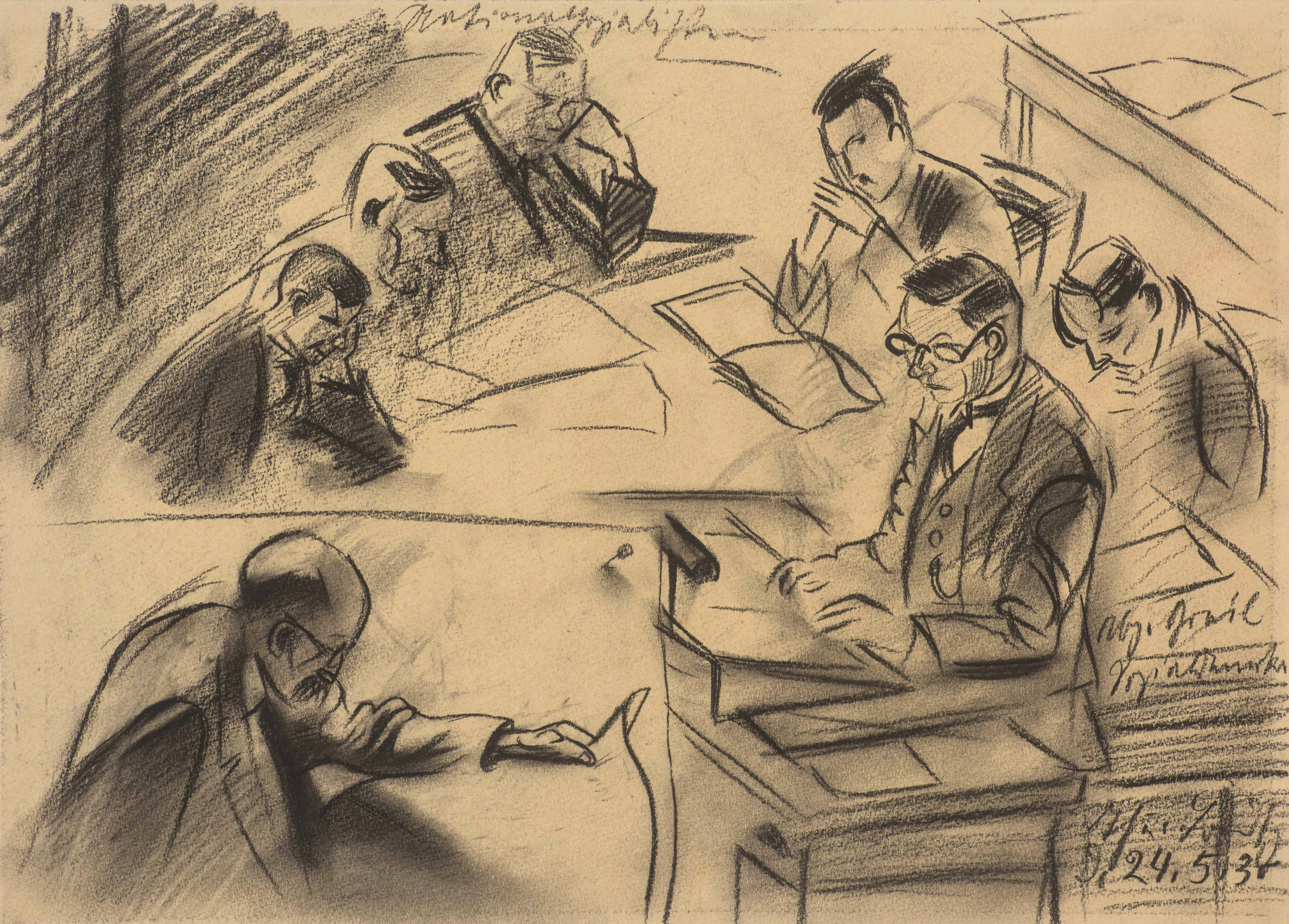
"Thuringia State Parliament – Abg. Greil (SPD) speaking“, 1930, chalk

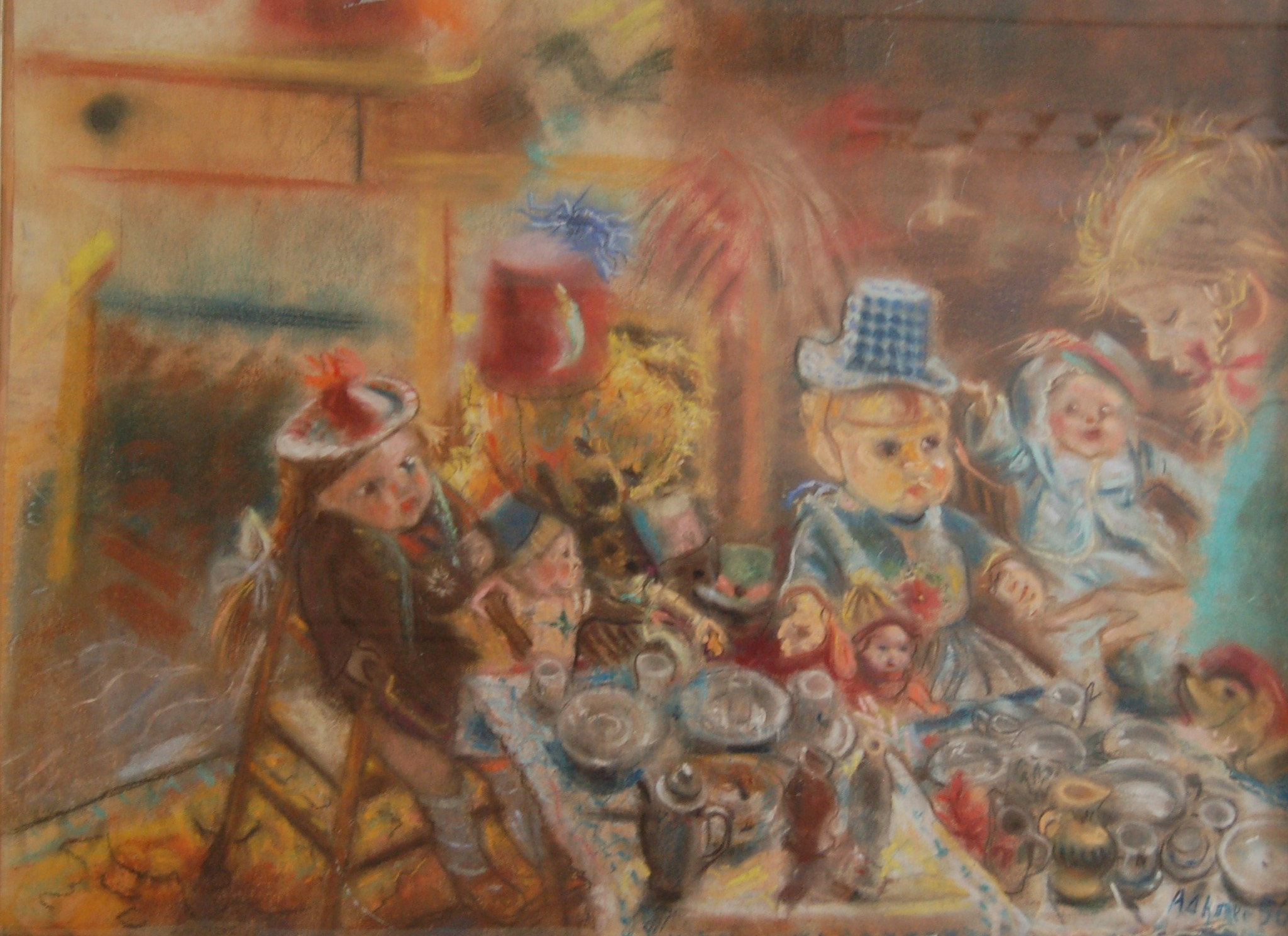
"Doll Carnival", 1959, pastel

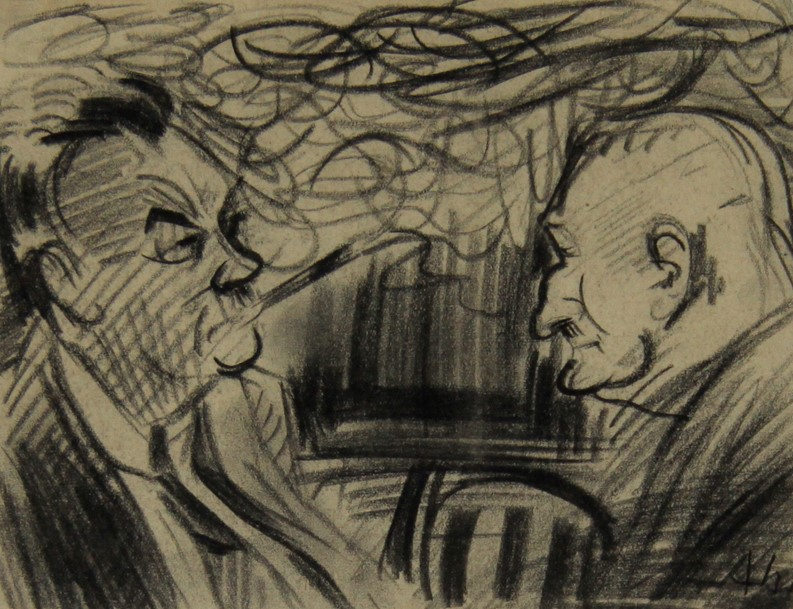
"Two Men in a Cafe´", 1930s-1940s, chalk

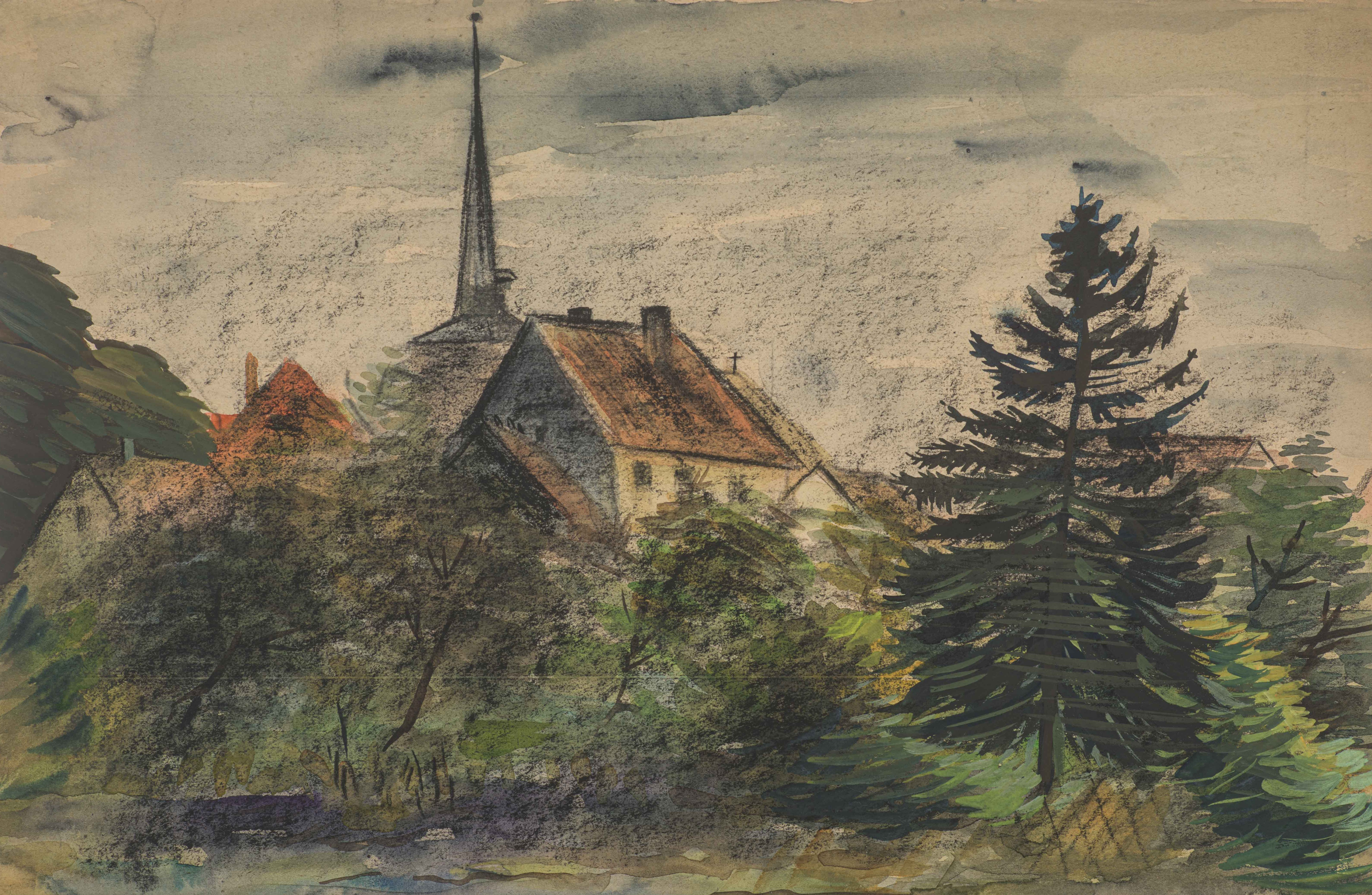
"Taubach with Church Tower“, 1945/46, chalk, watercolour and tempera

=== Collections containing his works ===
- Altenburg (Thüringen), Lindenau-Museum, Altenburg
- Dresden
  - Sächsische Landesbibliothek, Staats- und Universitätsbibliothek
  - Kupferstichkabinett Dresden
- Erfurt, Angermuseum
- Gera, Kunstsammlung Gera, Otto-Dix-Haus
- Halle (Saale), Stiftung Moritzburg – Kunstmuseum des Landes Sachsen-Anhalt
- Weimar
  - Stadtmuseum
  - Klassik Stiftung Weimar
- Thüringer Museum (Eisenach)
- Museum für Deutsche Geschichte/Deutsches Historisches Museum
- Museum Junge Kunst, Frankfurt (Oder)

== Exhibitions ==
=== Solo ===
- 20 Personalausstellungen bis 1989
- 1990/91: „Alfred Ahner – Zeichnungen und Pastelle“. Galerie am Fischmarkt, Erfurt; Lindenau-Museum Altenburg; Kunstgalerie Gera.
- 1994: „Alfred Ahner – Künstler und Chronist“, Kunstkabinett am Goetheplatz Weimar
- 1999: „Alfred Ahner – ein Maler im Thüringer Landtag“, Kabinettausstellung im Lindenau-Museum Altenburg
- 2001/02: „Alfred Ahner – Pastelle, Zeichnungen, Gemälde“. Kunsthaus Apolda; Stadtmuseum Groß-Gerau.
- 2002: „Landtagszeichnungen 1924–1933“. Thüringer Landtag, Erfurt.
- 2003: „Sehenden Auges“ – Alfred Ahner und das Ende von Weimar; Ausstellung der Stiftung Gedenkstätten Buchenwald; Kunsthalle „Harry Graf Keßler“, Weimar.
- 2008–2009: „Am feinsten ist’s im Café …!“ Zeichnungen und Pastell. Kunsthalle Harry Graf Kessler, Weimar. Ausstellung aus Anlass der Gründung der Alfred-Ahner-Stiftung.
- 2008–2009: „Bildchronist und Zeitzeuge – Der schriftliche Nachlaß des Weimarer Künstlers Alfred Ahner.“ Sächsische Landesbibliothek, Staats- und Universitätsbibliothek Dresden.
- 2008–2009: „Altenburger Bilder“ von Alfred Ahner, H. Burkhardt, Erich Dietz. Lindenau-Museum Altenburg
- 2009: „Alles Liebe“, Thüringer Freilichtmuseum Hohenfelden.
- 2010: „Alles Liebe“, Stadtmuseum Weimar.
- 16. August–12. November 2013, Kirms-Krackow-Haus Weimar: „Alfred Ahner (1890–1973) – Lebensbilder“ – Kabinett-Ausstellung zum 40. Todestag des Malers.
- 29. Juli bis 23. August 2013, Erfurt, Sparkasse am Fischmarkt: „Alfred Ahner – ausgewählte Meisterwerke in Pastell“
- 2014: Freilichtmuseum Hohenfelden, Hohenfelden („... dass dieses Morden bald ein Ende hat“)
- 2020: „Ich muss ... den Menschen ihr eigenes Spiegelbild zeigen“, Alfred Ahner als Chronist des Landes Thüringen von 1920 bis 1952, Stadtmuseum Weimar

=== Group ===
- 1946: Berlin, I. Deutsche Kunstausstellung
- 1946 und 1949: Dresden, Allgemeine Deutsche Kunstausstellung und 2. Deutsche Kunstausstellung
- 1946/1947 Leipzig, Museum der bildenden Künste („Mitteldeutsche Kunst“)
- 1968: Halle/Saale, Staatliche Galerie Moritzburg („Sieger der Geschichte“)
- 1974: Erfurt, Bezirkskunstausstellung
- 1974: Dresden, Kupferstichkabinett („Zeichnungen in der Kunst der DDR“)
- 1974: Weimar, Galerie im Schloss („Kunst für uns“)
- 1977: Weimar, Kunsthalle am Theaterplatz („Das Aquarell in fünf Jahrhunderten. Schätze der Kunstsammlungen zu Weimar“)
- 1979: Berlin, Altes Museum („Weggefährden – Zeitgenossen. Bildende Kunst aus 3 Jahrzehnten “)
- 1985: Erfurt, Gelände der Internationalen Gartenbauausstellung („Künstler im Bündnis“)

== Bibliography (in German) ==
- Christa Ada Anders (ed.): „Vorläufig muss ich leben bleiben“. Alfred Ahner – Aus den Brief- und Tagebüchern der Weimarer Künstlers (1890–1973). Georg Olms Verlag. Hildesheim-Zürich-New York, 2014, ISBN 978-3-487-08551-7.
- Dietmar Eisold, ed. (2010), "Ahner, Alfred", Lexikon Künstler in der DDR (in German), Berlin: Verlag Neues Leben, p. 161, ISBN 978-3-355-01761-9
- Lothar Lang: Malerei und Graphik in der DDR. Verlag Philipp Reclam jun., Leipzig 1983, S. 39, 262, 264.
- Lothar Lang: Alfred Ahner. In: Begegnungen im Atelier. Henschelverlag Berlin 1975, S. 177–180
- Thüringer Landtag: Alfred Ahner – Landtagszeichnungen 1924–1933. Begleit-Broschüre zur gleichnamigen Ausstellung im Thüringer Landtag 2002 in Erfurt. 68 Seiten, ohne ISBN.
- Helmut Scherf: Alfred Ahner. Maler und Werk. Verlag der Kunst, Dresden 1990, ISBN 3-364-00196-0.
- Alfred Ahner, Weimar – Malerei und Zeichnungen. Katalog zur Ausstellung, 12. Juli – 23. August 1964 im Thüringer Museum Eisenach.
- Alfred Ahner (with introduction by Erhard Frommhold): Zeichnungen. VEB Verlag der Kunst, Dresden 1962.
- Jörg-Heiko Bruns and Helmar Penndorf: Alfred Ahner 1890–1973. Zeichnungen und Pastelle. Buchdruckerei F. Schroeter, Friedrichroda 1989.

== External links (in German) ==
- "Bildindex entry".
- "Alfred-Ahner-Stiftung".
- "Artifacts entry".
- Nachlass of Alfred Ahner, also Appendices I, II and III in the Sächsischen Landesbibliothek – Staats- und Universitätsbibliothek Dresden
- Literature by and about Alfred Ahner (painter) in the German National Library catalogue
- Alfred Ahner: Drawings and documents, SLUB / Deutsche Fotothek
