= Rudolf Bergander =

German painter

Bergander in 1955

Rudolf Bergander (22 May 1909, Meißen – 10 April 1970, Dresden) was a German painter and principal of the Dresden Academy of Fine Arts from 1952 to 1958 and 1964–65. He was a member of the Association of Revolutionary Visual Artists.

== Life ==
Bergander trained as a porcelain painter, graduating in 1923, and worked in the Meissen state porcelain manufactury. From 1928 to 1932 he studied at the Dresden Academy of Fine Arts with Richard Müller and Otto Dix. In 1928 he joined the KPD, and in 1929 became a member of the Association of Revolutionary Visual Artists. From 1933 to 1940 he lived as a freelance artist in Meissen. In 1940 he joined the Nazi Party. By 1945, he was a cartographer in the Wehrmacht.

After the war, in 1946 Bergander joined the Socialist Unity Party of Germany. In 1947 he became a member of the Dresden artist group "Das Ufer" ("The Shore"). He freelanced until he became a lecturer on painting at the Academy of Fine Arts DDR in 1949. In 1951 he was appointed a professor. In the same year he undertook a study trip to Bulgaria. From 1955 to 1956 he toured and studied in Italy. In 1956 he was awarded the National Prize of the German Democratic Republic for his realistic oeuvre. In 1957 he had a visiting exhibition at the German Academy of Arts in Berlin.

From 1952 to 1958 and 1964 to 1965, he was rector of the Dresden Academy of Fine Arts. Since 1961 he was a member and Permanent Secretary of Fine Arts of the German Academy of Arts. In 1962 he was awarded the Patriotic Order of Merit for outstanding achievements in the cultural field, receiving Bronze then Silver in 1969. In 1964 he was awarded the Banner of Labor.

Bergander is buried in the Heide cemetery in Dresden.

== See also ==
- List of German painters
