= Curt Querner =

German painter

Curt Querner (1904–1976) was a German painter.

== Biography ==
Querner was born in Börnchen, a village in Saxony not far south of Dresden (later incorporated into Possendorf, which today is part of Bannewitz). The son of a shoemaker, he trained in metalworking and worked for a time as a factory mechanic (Fabrikschlosser).

From 1926 to 1930 Querner studied at the Dresden Academy of Fine Arts. He exhibited for the first time at the Galerie Junge Kunst, of Józef Sandel, in Dresden.
