= Oskar Nerlinger =

German painter

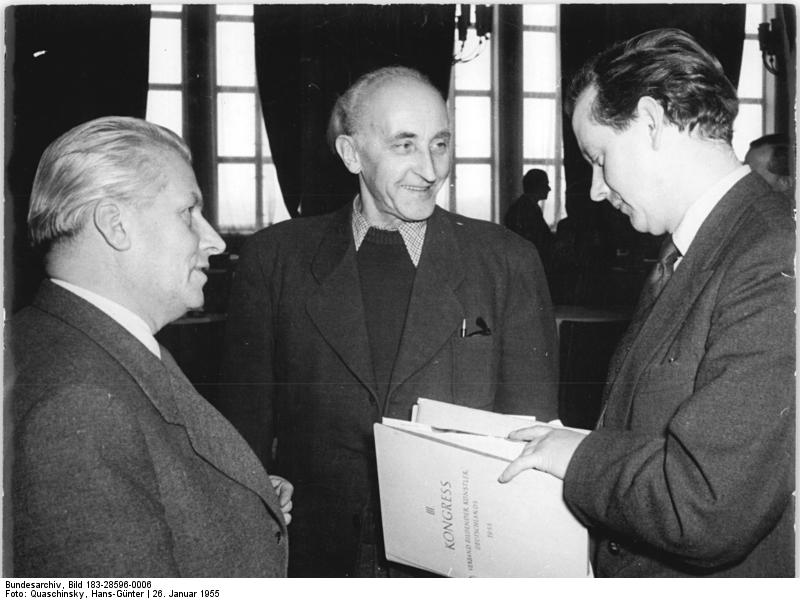
- Born: 23 March 1893; Straubenhardt, Germany
- Died: 25 August 1969 (aged 76); East Berlin, German Democratic Republic
- Occupation: Painter

Oskar Nerlinger (23 March 1893 – 25 August 1969) was a German painter. His work was part of the painting event in the art competition at the 1932 Summer Olympics.
