= Lea Grundig =

German painter and graphic artist (1906–1977)

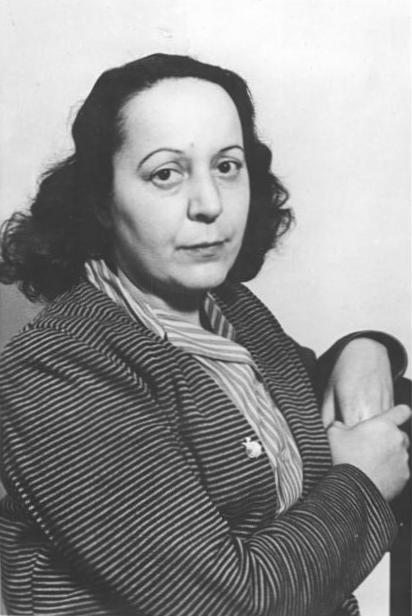
- Lea Grundig (1951)
- Born: Lea Langer; 23 March 1906; Dresden, Kingdom of Saxony, German Empire
- Died: 10 October 1977 (aged 71) while traveling, at sea (Mediterranean)
- Occupations: painter Graphic artist
- Political party: KPD; SED
- Spouse: Hans Grundig (1901-1958)

Lea Grundig (Dresden, 23 March 1906 – 10 October 1977, at sea) was a German painter and graphic artist.

== Life ==
Lea Langer was born in the old central heart of Dresden, where she grew up as part of the city's Jewish community. Her father was a joiner/furniture maker and her mother worked in garment manufacturing. Lea attended school locally between 1912 and 1922, while rejecting, even as a young girl, the family's religious orthodoxy. She went on to study at the city's Decorative Arts and Crafts Academy before progressing, in 1924, to the prestigious Saxon Art Academy: here she was admitted into the Masterclass of Otto Gussmann where fellow participants included Otto Griebel, Wilhelm Lachnit and Hans Grundig. At the Academy she also got to know Otto Dix, whom she would come to regard as one of the most influential of her mentors. She remained at The Academy till 1926.

1926 was the year in which she joined the Communist Party (KPD). She was also a co-founder of the Association of Revolutionary Visual Artists (ARBKD / Assoziation revolutionärer bildender Künstler Deutschlands). In 1928 she left the Jewish community and, in further defiance of her father's will, married Hans Grundig.

In January 1933 the NSDAP (Nazi Party) took power and quickly set about creating a one party state. Membership of any party other than the Nazi party - and particularly of the Communist Party - became illegal. Grundig nevertheless remained an active participant in resistance to the regime, as part of a group that also included Kurt Magritz and Rudi Wetzel. The new government also lost no time in implementing racist ideas that had been a key theme of the Nazis in opposition: government policy in Germany became actively, and as time passed ever more violently, antisemitic. In the mid-1930s Lea Grundig's own work, reflected themes of the new Nazi age, with her cycles "Harzburger Front", "Unterm Hakenkreuz" (1936), "Der Jude ist schuld!" (1935–38), "Krieg droht!"(1935–37), "Im Tal des Todes" (1942/43) and "Ghetto".

In 1935 a ban was imposed on exhibits of her work and in May 1936 she was finally, albeit this time briefly, arrested. Later in 1936 she traveled to Switzerland but she then returned to her home city and it was in Dresden that in May 1938 she was again arrested. In March 1939 she was found guilty of "Preparing to commit High Treason" (»Vorbereitung zum Hochverrat«) as a result of her Communist activities and/or her Jewish provenance, and was sentenced to four months imprisonment. She served her sentence, which in the event lasted till November/December 1939, in a prison in Dresden. However, on her release she was granted an emigration permit. She emigrated to Bratislava, then the capital of the still notionally independent Slovak Republic (Slovakia). In 1940 she reached a refugee camp in Slovakia from where she moved as an exile to Palestine. Here she survived in a British internment camp at Atlit till 1942. On release she remained, till the end of 1948, in Palestine, living successively in Haifa and Tel Aviv. She was again able to show her work legally: exhibitions of her work took place not just in Palestine where she was living but also in the USA, France, South Africa and Great Britain. Her membership of the Palestinian Communist Party during this time was not legal. She also contributed illustrations to "Volksstimme", the newspaper of the (Jewish part of the) Palestinian party.

Quotation

"I wanted to present people in such a way that you would receive and recognise their misery and suffering, and instantly feel your own rage because of it."

Lea Grundig in her autobiography (1958)

"Ich wollte die Menschen so darstellen, daß man ihr Elend, ihre Leiden erkannte und zugleich Zorn darüber empfand."

Lea Grundig in her autobiography (1958)

Lea Grundig traveled to Europe at the end of the year, living for a few months in Prague before returning to Dresden in February 1949: she received a professorship later in the year, teaching in 1949/50 at the Dresden Fine Arts Academy. After the end of the war in May 1945 Dresden had found itself in the Soviet occupation zone of what remained of Germany, and by now the zone was evolving into the German Democratic Republic (East Germany). On arriving in East Germany Grundig joined the new country's recently created ruling Socialist Unity Party (SED / Sozialistische Einheitspartei Deutschlands), her communist beliefs now placing her in her country's political mainstream. From 1950 till its abolition in 1952 she sat as a member on the Saxony Regional Assembly, representing not her political party, but the "Kulturbund" one of the "mass-movements" able to nominate members to regional and national assemblies under the parody-democratic system then in operation. During the 1950s and 60s she was able to travel extensively to countries with which East Germany was aligned politically, including the People's Republic of China, Cuba and Cambodia. In 1961 Grundig became a full member of the East German Academy of Culture. In 1963 she was able to testify at the trial of Hans Globke. From 1964 till 1970 she served as President of the Visual Artists' Association in succession to Walter Arnold. 1964 was also the year in which she joined The Party's Central Committee.

Lea Grundig died in 1977 at sea on the Mediterranean, while traveling on a boat called "MS Völkerfreundschaft" ("MS Peoples' Friendship"). Her body is buried at the Heidefriedhof (Heath cemetery) in Dresden. Her written archive is held at the Arts Academy in Berlin.

== Awards and honours ==
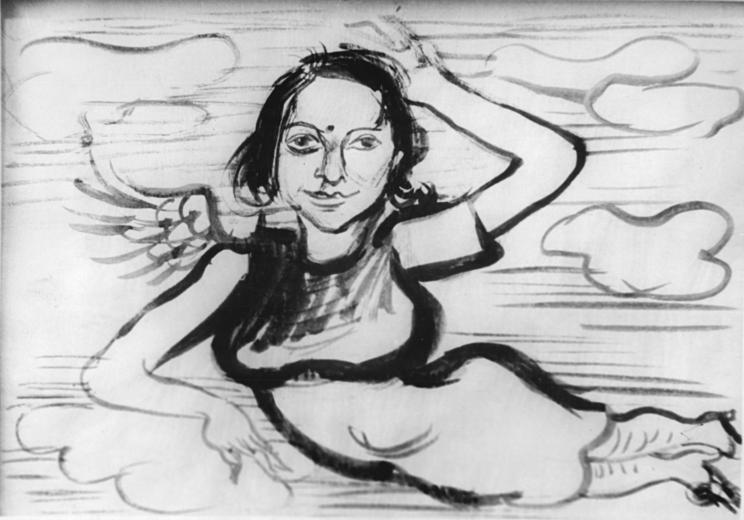
"Portrait of Lea" by Hans Grundig (1928)

During the period of the German Democratic Republic Lea Grundig was the recipient of numerous awards.

- 1957: Patriotic Order of Merit in Bronze
- 1958: National Prize of East Germany 2nd Class for her Total work
- 1961: Arts prize of the Free German Trade Union Federation for her drawing Drei von der Brigade Makarenko
- 1964: Clara Zetkin Medal
- 1965: Patriotic Order of Merit in Gold
- 1967: National Prize of East Germany 1st Class
- 1970: Ehrenpräsidentin East German Visual Artists' Association
- 1970: Patriotic Order of Merit Gold clasp
- 1972: Honorary doctorate from the Ernst Moritz Arndt University of Greifswald
- 1976: Order of Karl Marx

== Lea Grundig foundation ==
In 1972 Lea Grundig made a payment to the Ernst Moritz Arndt University of Greifswald, establishing a fund for the Hans and Lea Grundig Foundation. The purpose was to endow an annual prize for outstanding achievements in the fields of art, culture and culture-related teaching for students and graduates at Greifswald's Caspar David Friedrich Institute. However, the prize ceased to be awarded after 1996. Following German reunification in 1990, several members of the Caspar David Friedrich Institute contended that naming a prize for "Lea Grundig", an unapologetic member of East Germany's discredited cultural and political establishment, could not be seen as acceptable. The ensuing arguments continued for some years, but at the start of 2011 the University of Greifswald was able to pass the assets of Hans and Lea Grundig Foundation to the Rosa Luxemburg Foundation. The Rosa Luxembourg Foundation undertook to award the Lea Grundig prize in a contemporary manner that would respect the sensibilities of Lea Grundig.

== Selected publications ==
- Begei Haharegah (In the valley of slaughter), Tel Aviv, 1944. (Copy held in the Wiener Library, London)
- Heiner, Maria and Rose, Dirk: Lea Grundig - The witch folder. Galerie Rose, Hamburg, (German), 2009.
- Heiner, Maria: Lea Grundig - Art for the People. Hentrich & Hentrich, Berlin/Leipzig, (2nd revised edition, German), 2019.
- Heiner, Maria: Lea Grundig - Art for the People. Hentrich & Hentrich, Berlin/Leipzig, (English), 2020.
- Heiner, Maria: Lea Grundig - Under the Swastika. Etchings from the 1930s from the Maria Heiner Collection, Dresden. Exhibition catalogue,(German), 2022 .
- Heiner, Maria (ed.) and Mendelsohn, Tina: Lea Grundig - Under the Rainbow, Illustrations from Hebrew children's and young adult books, Hentrich & Hentrich, Leipzig/Berlin, (German), 2023.
