= Austrian Museum of Folk Life and Folk Art =

Museum in Vienna, Austria

Coordinates: 48°12′47.9″N 16°21′3.26″E

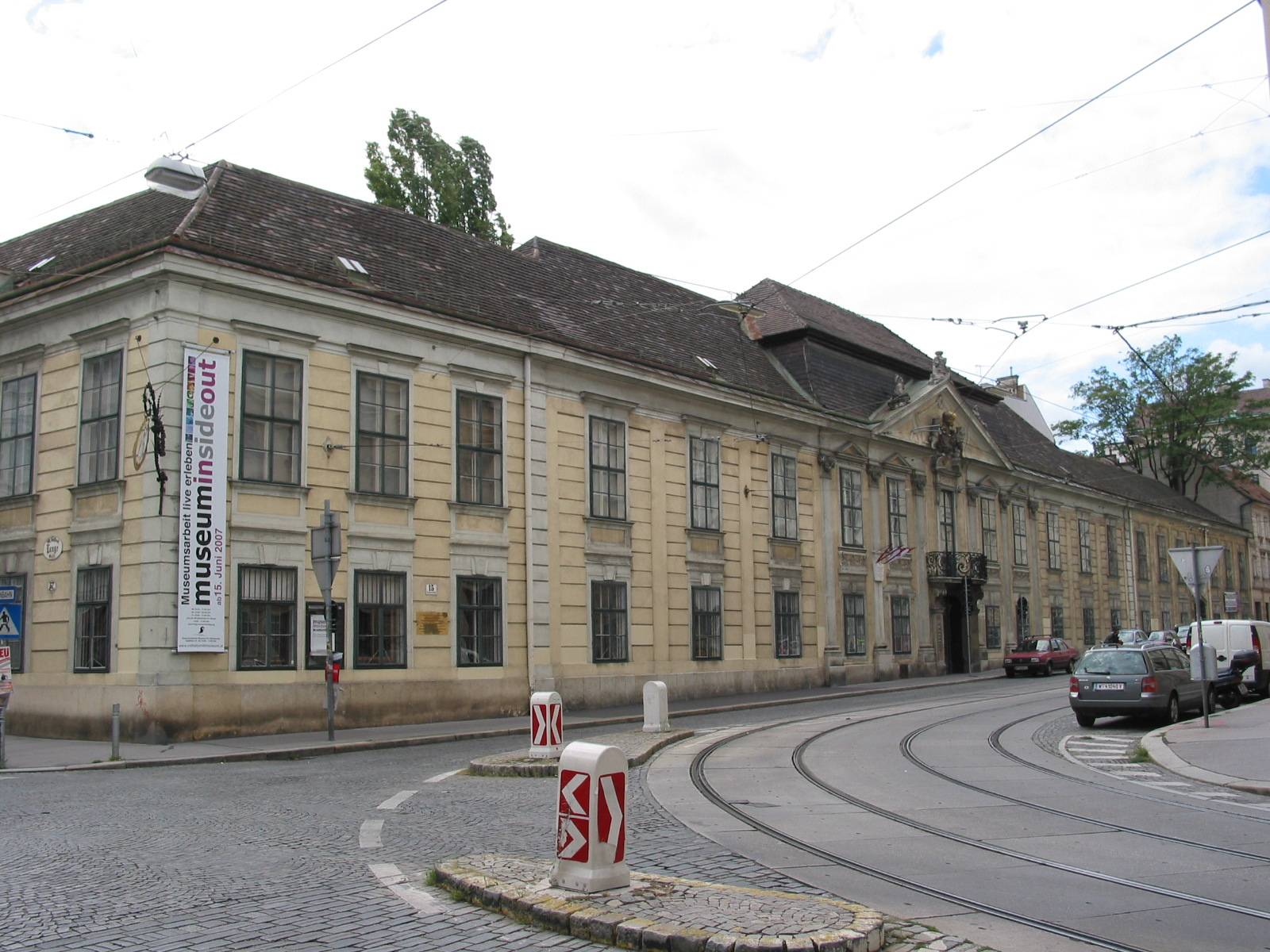
Austrian Museum of Folk Life and Folk Art

Austrian Museum of Folk Life and Folk Art (German: Österreichisches Museum für Volkskunde) is the largest folk museum in Vienna, Austria, and is located at Laudongasse 15–19, in the 8th district, in the former Schönborn Palace.

== History ==
The museum was founded in 1895 by Michael Haberlandt and Wilhelm Hein, both officials in the Prehistoric-Ethnographic Department of the Imperial and Royal Natural History Court Museum (now the Natural History Museum, Vienna) and leading members of the Anthropological Society in Vienna. The legal entity is the Association for Folklore, founded by Haberlandt and Hein in 1894. The collections were initially stored in apartments and warehouses before the museum found its first home in the Great Hall of the Vienna Stock Exchange in 1898. In 1917, it moved to the baroque Schönborn Palace, and it opened in 1920.

The collections were intended for the entire area of the Cisleithanian half of the Austro-Hungarian Empire, and were intended to represent all peoples united under the Austrian crown. In accordance with a guideline of preserving the (multi-ethnic) state, they expanded to other European regions and followed the direction of a "comparative" folklore study.
