= Hans Grundig =

German painter (1901–1958)

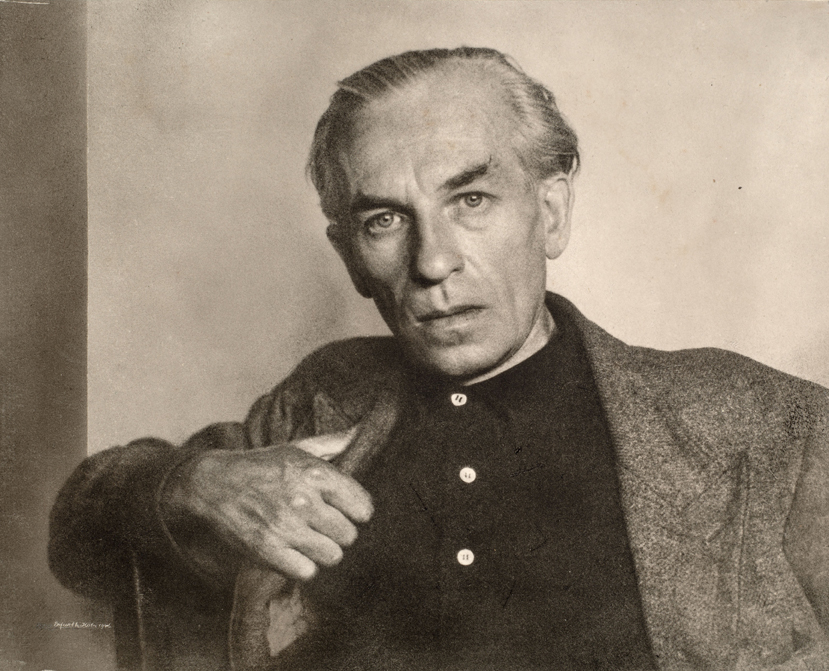
- Portrait of Hans Grundig by Hugo Erfurth, 1946
- Born: February 19, 1901; Dresden, Saxony, Germany
- Died: September 11, 1958 (aged 57); Dresden, Saxony, GDR (East Germany)
- Occupations: painter Graphic artist
- Political party: KPD; SED
- Spouse: Lea Langer / Grundig (1906–1977)

Hans Grundig (February 19, 1901 – September 11, 1958) was a German painter and graphic artist associated with the New Objectivity movement.

He was born in Dresden and, after an apprenticeship as an interior decorator, studied in 1920–1921 at the Dresden School of Arts and Crafts. He then studied at the Dresden Academy from 1922 to 1923. During the 1920s his paintings, primarily portraits of working-class subjects, were influenced by the work of Otto Dix. Like his friend Gert Heinrich Wollheim, he often depicted himself in a theatrical manner, as in his Self-Portrait during the Carnival Season (1930).

He had his first solo exhibition in 1930 at the Dresden gallery of Józef Sandel. He made his first etchings in 1933.

Politically anti-fascist, he joined the German Communist Party in 1926, and was a founding member of the arts organization Assoziation revolutionärer bildender Künstler in Dresden in 1929.

Following the fall of the Weimar Republic, Grundig was declared a degenerate artist by the Nazis, who included his works in the defamatory Degenerate Art exhibition in Munich in 1937. He expressed his antagonism toward the regime in paintings such as The Thousand Year Reich (1936). Forbidden to practice his profession, he was arrested twice—briefly in 1936, and again in 1938, after which he was interned in Sachsenhausen concentration camp from 1940 to 1944.

In 1945 he went to Moscow, where he attended an anti-fascist school. Returning to Berlin in 1946, he became a professor of painting at the Dresden Academy of Fine Arts. In 1957 he published his autobiography, Zwischen Karneval und Aschermittwoch ("Between Shrovetide carnival and Ash Wednesday"). He was awarded the Heinrich Mann Prize in Berlin in 1958, the year of his death.

== See also ==
- List of German painters
