= Otto Griebel =

German painter (1895–1972)

Otto Griebel (31 March 1895 – 7 March 1972) was a German painter most associated with New Objectivity and proletarian-revolutionary art.

== Life and work ==
Son of a master upholsterer, Griebel began an apprenticeship as a decorative painter in 1909, and a short time later he moved to the Royal Drawing School in Dresden, where he met Otto Dix. From 1911 until he was drafted in 1915, Griebel studied stained glass with Josef Goller at the Dresden School of Applied Arts where he also painted his first oil paintings.

In August 1915, Griebel became a soldier in the First World War. After the war (where he was seriously wounded) he became a member of the revolutionary workers' and soldiers' council in Dresden and joined the KPD. In 1919, Griebel became a master student of Robert Sterl at the Dresden Academy, and he met Oskar Kokoschka. In 1919/1920 he worked with the Dadaists and was part of the Dresden Dada group. Friendships were formed with George Grosz and John Heartfield. He was a member of the Junge Rheinland in Düsseldorf, the Bielefelderwurf, the Berlin November group and in 1921 co-founder of the “Red Group” in Dresden. When the Estonian violinist Julius Eduard Sõrmus performed at KPD solidarity events in the 1920s, Griebel was one of his companions through Germany. In 1921 he assisted the KPD during the various workers' uprisings and worked as a draftsman for many of the party's publications. This same year he made the acquaintance of George Grosz, Otto Nagel, and Rudolf Schlichter. From 1922 he took part in the Dresden Secession art group.

Griebel also became an important man for the art of puppetry, popular in Dresden. Through his friend Otto Kunze, a musician and hand puppeteer born in Dresden in 1888, he came into contact with the puppet theatre and “captured” Kunze's carved hand puppet heads, and he also designed the corresponding stage sets. Griebel himself worked as a hand puppeteer, but couldn't decide to make puppetry his profession. Griebel's “puppetry” estate is now in the Puppet Theater Collection section of the Dresden State Art Collections.

After the National Socialists came to power, Griebel was arrested by the Gestapo in 1933 and his work was classified as hostile communist art, but he was released after protest by the Secession. From then on he belonged to the circle of the upright seven, who openly discussed their art and political stance in private. In 1937, as part of the “Degenerate Art” campaign, Griebel's works were confiscated and destroyed. The 2012 Munich artworks discovery belonging to Cornelius Gurlitt, contained two works by Griebel: "Child at the Table" and the watercolour "The Veiled One".

Despite his communist political views, Griebel managed to remain a mandatory member of the Reich Chamber of Fine Arts. He apparently took part in exhibitions, although this participation was interrupted from 1937 to 1940. Remarkably, he lived through the war years in Germany almost unharmed, even assisting around 20 Jewish men in escaping from the Tarnow ghetto. Unfortunately, the majority of his work met its demise during the air raid on Dresden in his apartment at Nicolaistrasse 30 in February 1945.

Griebel took part in the first art exhibition in Dresden after the end of the war in 1945/1946 (“Free Artists. Exhibition No. 1”), in 1946 in the art exhibition of Saxon artists in Dresden, in the General German Art Exhibition and in 1949 in the 2nd German Art Exhibition in Dresden and had a significant number of other solo exhibitions and exhibition participations, especially in exhibitions by anti-fascist artists.

Until 1960, Griebel worked at the Workers' and Farmers' Faculty of Fine Arts at the Dresden University of Fine Arts.

Griebel was the father of the local historian Matthias Griebel. Griebel's grave is in the Loschwitz Cemetery.

== See also ==
- List of German painters
