= Helmut Heinze =

German sculptor

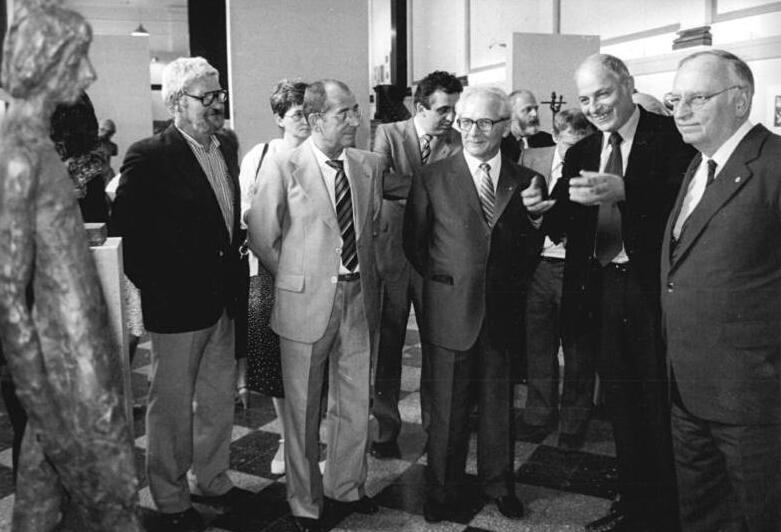
- Professor Helmut Heinze (second from right) explaining his statue Knabenakt to Erich Honecker (third form right), Kurt Hager (first from right), Egon Krenz (first behind Honecker), Prof Willi Sitte (second from left) and professor Jo Jastram (first from left) at Albertinum on 2 October 1982.
- Born: Helmut Heinze; 24 April 1932; Mulda, German Reich
- Known for: Sculpting

Helmut Heinze (born 24 April 1932) is a German sculptor. From 1979 to 1997 Heinze was professor of plastic arts at the Dresden Academy of Fine Arts.

== Life ==
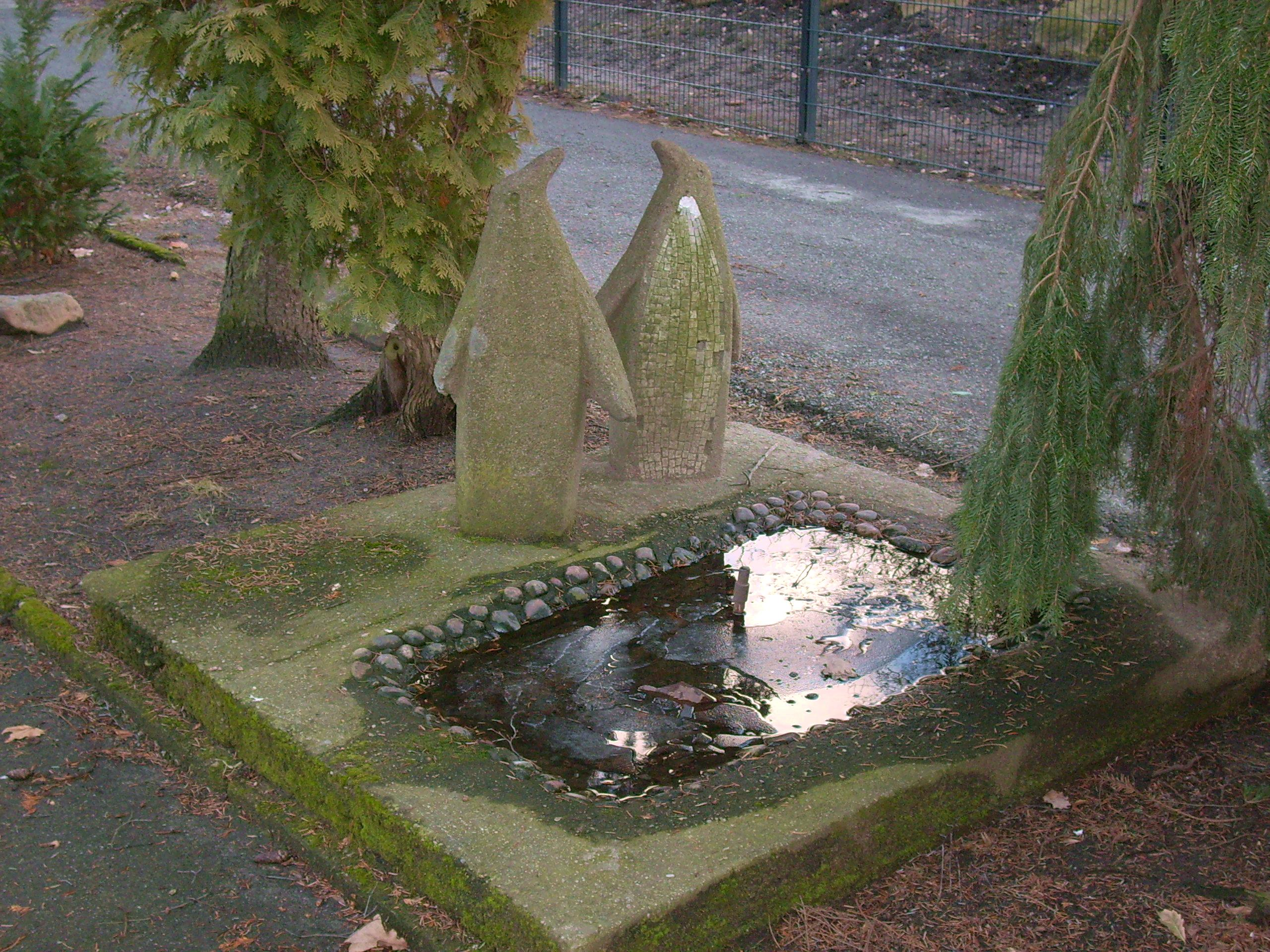
Pinguine, Hoyerswerda 1958

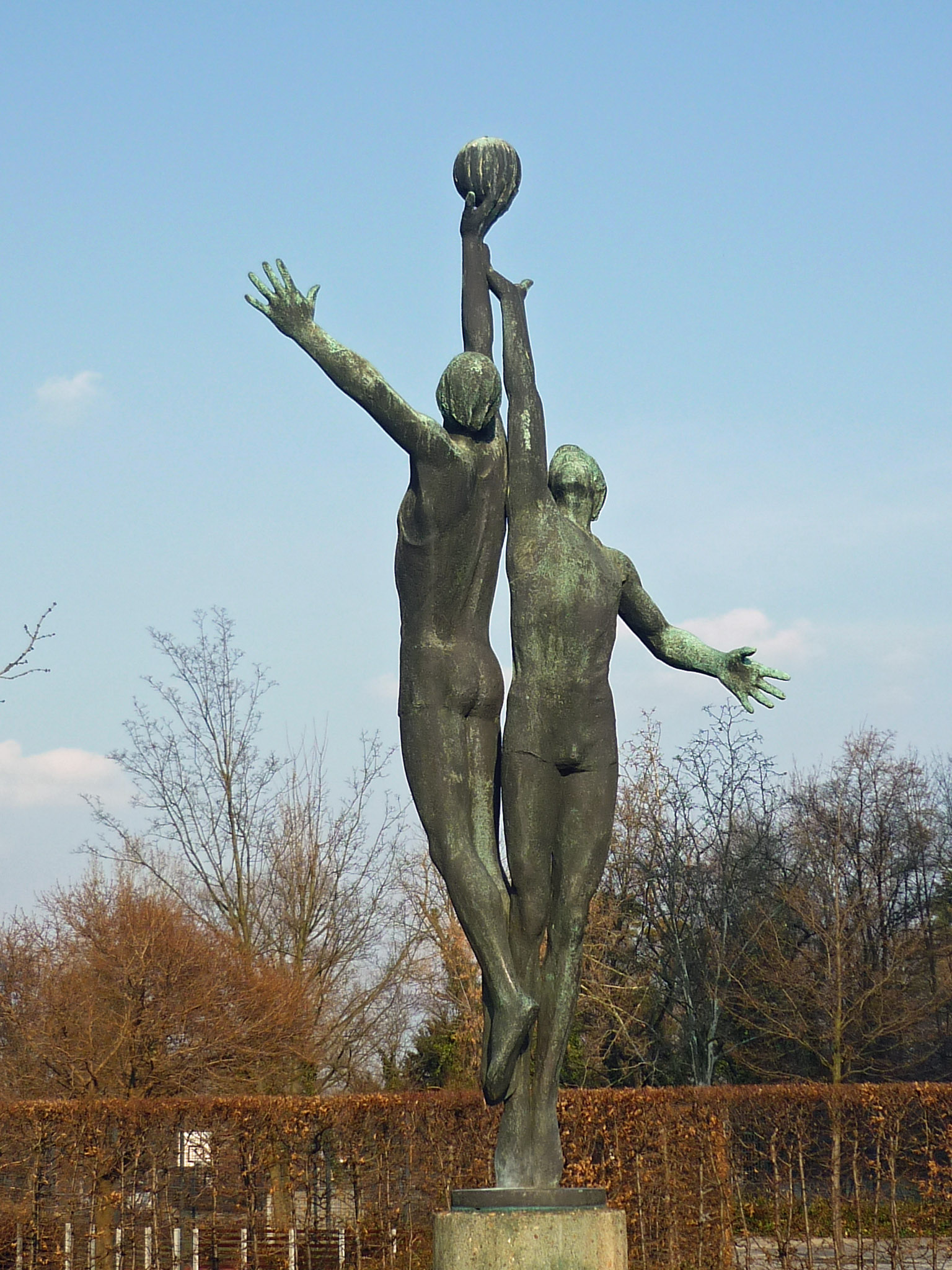
Ballspieler (together with Wilhelm Landgraf), Dresden 1971

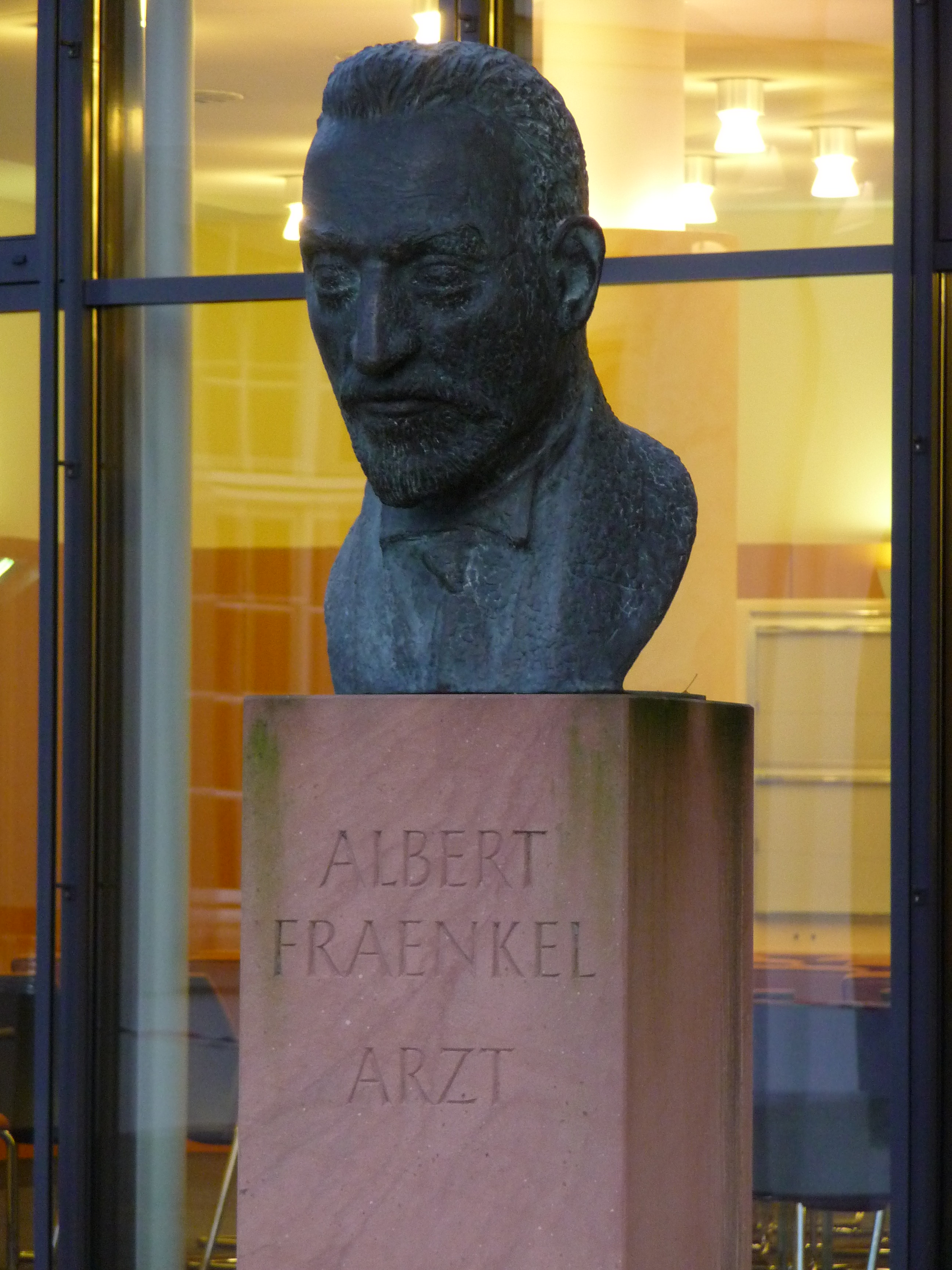
Bust of Albert Fraenkel, Heidelberg 2004

Heinze, son to a railwayman, was born in Mulda and raised in Dresden where he attended Volksschule and Oberschule. During his school time Heinze took drawing courses from Etha Richter.

In 1950 Heinze began his studies at Dresden Academy of Fine Arts under Erich Fraaß und Walter Arnold. During this time he created his first graphics and plastics and met Gerhard Richter who studied in Dresden at the same time. Letters from Richter to Heinze dating back to ca. 1960 were acquired by the Gerhard Richter Archiv of Staatliche Kunstsammlungen Dresden in 2008. Heinze was introduced to Dresden-based artists by Rudolf Nehmer and created a bust of Nehmer in 1957. In 1973 Nehmers integrated Heinze's sculpture Flötenspiel und Gesang (Flute Playing and Song) in his painting Natur und Kunst (Nature and Art). From 1953 to 1955 Heinze interrupted his studies for a stone sculptor apprenticeship under Werner Hempel. During this time Heinze participated in restoring the Dresden Kreuzkirche and the Meissen Cathedral. In 1955 he continued his studies and fished them in 1957, working as a freelance artist since. In 1956 Heinze married the costume designer Erika Simmank with whom he had two sons (in 1959 and 1962). Heinze's first studio was at Villa Gustav Ziller, Augustusweg in Radebeul. In 1957 he created the animal sculpture Sitzender Hund (Sitting Dog) for the city of Hoyerswerda, one of Heinze's many contributions to public art.

In 1961 Heinze received a university teaching position in figure drawing with architectural specialisation at Dresden University of Technology. During this time he was research assistant to Walter Howard, professor for architectural sculpture. Soon after, in 1969 he became lecturer for architecture at Dresden University of Technology and taught the basics of design.

Together with Wilhelm Landgraf he created the group sculpture Ballspieler (alternative title: Studenten beim Sport in 1971) that was placed in front of Dresden University of Technology's student residences at Wundstraße. Heinze was lecturer for sculpture at Dresden Academy of Fine Arts in 1972 and became head of the department of sculpture in 1976, followed by his professorship in sculpting in 1979. Amongst his students was Thomas Jastram. Later in 1981 Heinze got a solo exhibition of his works at the Dresden Academy of Fine Arts and was awarded with the Art Prize of the German Democratic Republic. In 1984 the Martin-Andersen-Nexö art award of the city of Dresden was conferred on Heinze.

In 1988 Heinze travelled to Italy for the first time, followed by a second trip in 1992. Heinze was a member of the Higher Education Commission of Saxony from 1991 to 1993, participating in the reorganisation of Saxony's universities after the Peaceful Revolution of 1989. He became a member of the art commission of the city of Dresden in 1995. In 1997 Heinze retired as professor at Dresden Academy of Fine Arts and moved from Dresden to Kreischa a year later. Until 2012 Heinze worked on his sculpture Chor der Überlebenden (Choir of Survivors) for Stiftung Frauenkirche Dresden. The 2.77 m statue depicting seven figures was installed at Coventry Cathedral in May 2012 as a sign of reconciliation. Heinze was working on a design for a memorial for the victims of the Bombing of Dresden in World War II since the 1960s. For his 80th birthday Staatliche Kunstsammlungen Dresden dedicated the exhibition Figur und Porträt (figure and portrait) to Heinze at the Albertinum. Heinze's works are part of the collection of the Skulpturensammlung, the National Gallery, the Dresden City Museum, the Kunstmuseum Moritzburg Halle (Saale), the Museum der bildenden Künste as well as the Kunstsammlungen Chemnitz – Museum am Theaterplatz.

== Work ==
Heinze's central motif is the statue - from statuette to colossal statue. His works are characterised by a reduction in substance and sparseness in their design language.

In his earlier career Heinze was influenced by Gerhard Marcks, whose Cologne studio he visited in 1956. Later on Heinze was inspired by the gothic sculptures of Wilhelm Lehmbruck with their long and thin bodies. Over the years Heinze's focus shifted from the visual idea to the artistic idea of his works.

Heinze's sculptures are distinctive in their display of a transformation from psyche to physicality. Man is "somatised matter" and the spirit of man can not be displayed, but visualised "via a carrier" by the sculptor.

Influenced by Hans Steger, whom Heinze met in 1955 and who understood sculpting as applied psychology, Heinze created several statues featuring particle-like crimping and sparse surfaces, while keeping his designs realistic.

== Selected works ==
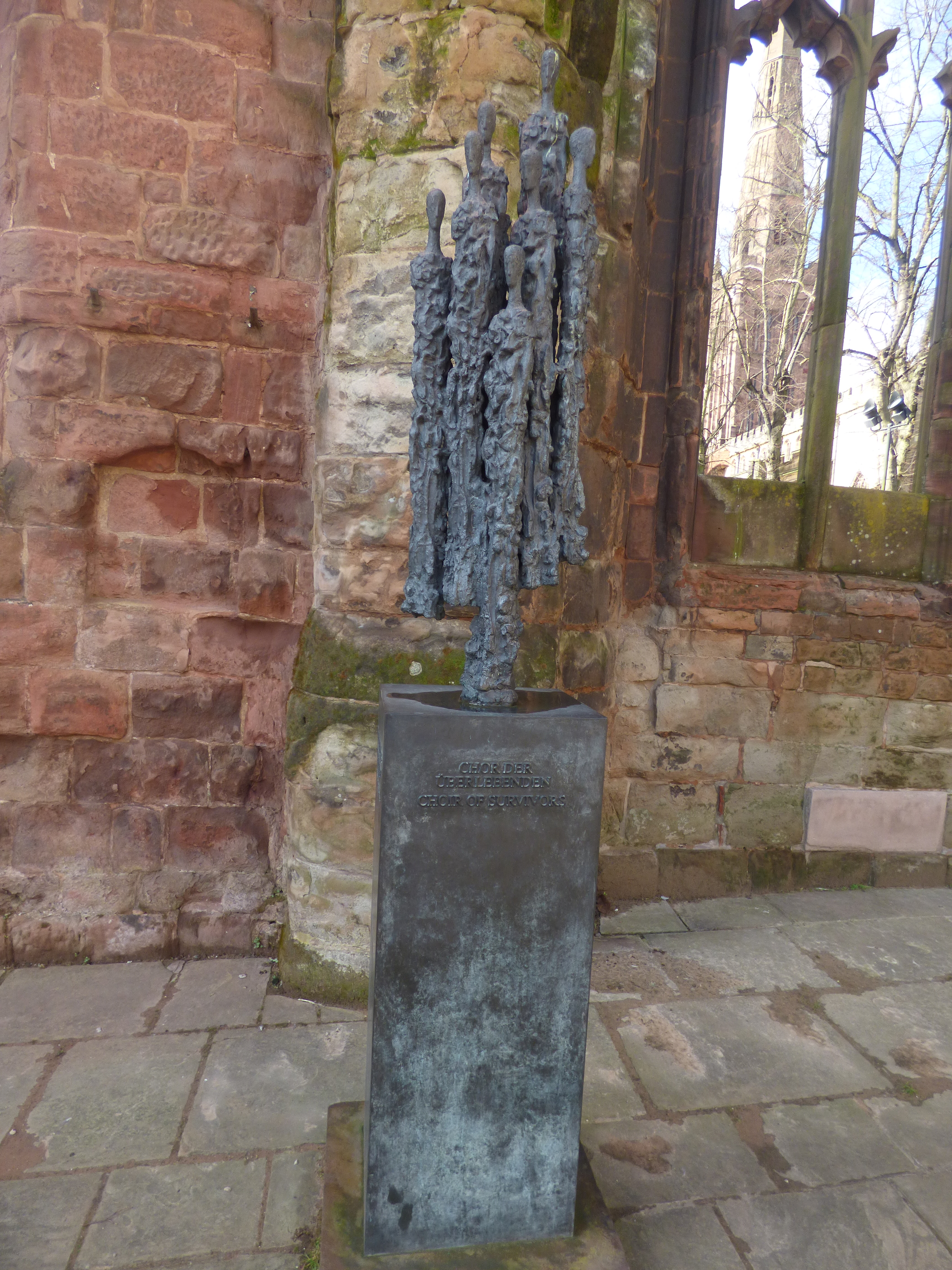
Helmut Heinze's 2012 sculpture Chor der Überlebenden (Choir of Survivors) at Coventry Cathedral.

- 1957: Sitzender Hund – Tierplastik, Hoyerswerda
- 1958: Pinguine – Betonplastik, Zoo Hoyerswerda
- 1959: Lessingbüste – Hoyerswerda
- 1959–1962: Mutter-Kind-Gruppe – Bronzeguss, Frankfurt an der Oder (Aufstellung 1962)
- 1965: Wandflächengestaltung Kinderkrippe Seevorstadt-Ost, Dresden
- 1968: Fertigstellung der Bronzefigur Ingrid Krämer von Hans Steger – Schwimm- und Sprunghalle Freiberger Platz, Dresden
- 1971: Ballspieler – Plastikgruppe mit Wilhelm Landgraf, Studentenwohnheime Wundtstraße, Dresden
- 1973: Statuette Bernhard Kretzschmar (1. Fassung) – Staatliche Kunstsammlungen Dresden
- 1976–1981: Großer Jüngling – Bronzeplastik, 1994 im Hausgarten des Sächsischen Staatsministeriums für Wissenschaft und Kunst aufgestellt
- 1976: Porträt des Schauspielers F. W. Junge, 2. Fassung – Staatliche Kunstsammlungen Dresden
- 1984: Stehender weiblicher Akt – Bronze
- 1986–1989: Stehender junger Mann, 1. Fassung
- 1994–1996: Stehender junger Mann, Pulsnitzer Fassung – Park der Helios-Reha-Klinik Schloss Pulsnitz
- 2000: Fritz Löffler – Bronzestatue, Fritz-Löffler-Gymnasium Dresden
- 2004: Porträtstele Albert Fraenkel – Heidelberg
- 2012: Chor der Überlebenden – siebenfigürige Gruppe, Coventry Cathedral, Coventry

== Selected exhibitions ==
- 1976: Galerie im Filmtheater Prager Straße, Dresden
- 1981: Helmut Heinze. Plastik. Hochschule für Bildende Künste, Dresden
- 1987: Wort und Werk Kunstausstellungen Leipzig
- 1988: Kleine Galerie Arneburg
- 1993: Plastiken, Zeichnungen und Fundstücke; Kunstausstellung Kühl, Dresden
- 2002: Plastiken und Zeichnungen Heinzes nlässlich des 70. Geburtstages; Ernst-Rietschel-Kulturring, Pulsnitz
- 2010: Porträts, Plastiken, Fundstücke und Zeichnungen; Galerie am Plan, Pirna
- 2012: Retrospektive; Kunstausstellung Kühl, Dresden
- 2012: Chor der Überlebenden – Entwürfe für die Opfer der Bombenangriffe auf Coventry und Dresden; Galerie im Geburtshaus Ernst Rietschels, Pulsnitz
- 2012: Figur und Porträt. Sonderausstellung; Staatliche Kunstsammlungen Dresden, Albertinum
