= Reinhard Dietrich =

German sculptor

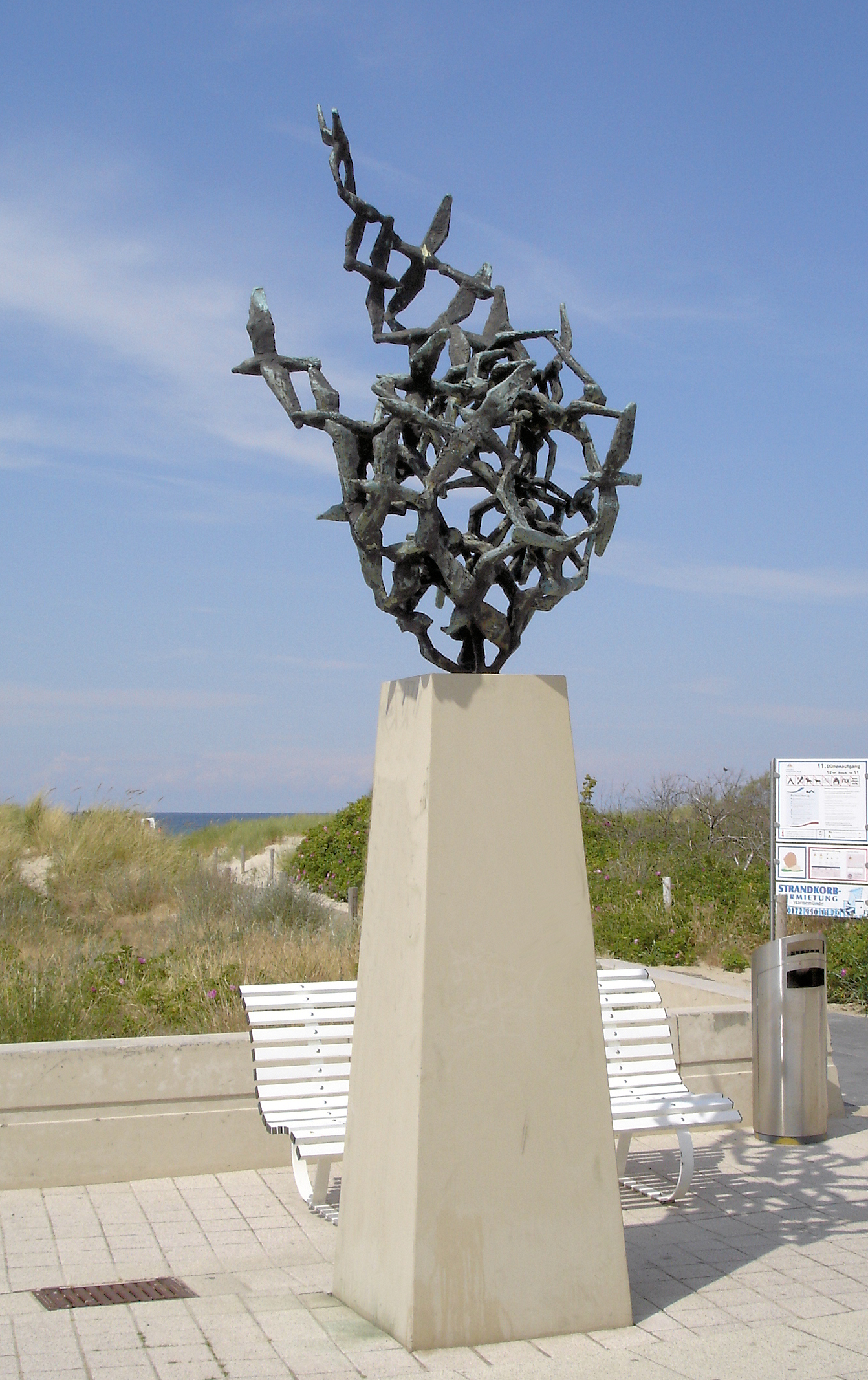
"Möwenflug" ("Gulls' Flight"), in Warnemünde, by Reinhard Dietrich "Schiwago" 2008

Reinhard Dietrich (14 February 1932 – 7 March 2015) was a German sculptor.

== Life ==
Reinhard Dietrich was born in Breslau less than a year before the increasingly challenged "Weimar" regime was replaced by the Nazi government. By the time he was born 13 frontiers had moved and Breslau was rapidly becoming Wrocław, ethnically and politically part of Poland. Between 1946 and 1950 Dietrich lived in Wittenberg within the Soviet occupation zone of Germany, where he undertook an apprenticeship in the art of wood carving. This was followed by a period of study at the Wood carving Academy in Empfertshausen (1950–1952), and two or three years of further study at the College of Applied Arts at Leipzig (1952–1954). At Leipzig he was taught by Rudolf Oelzner and Alfred Thiele. After this he moved on to the Dresden Academy of Fine Arts where he was taught by Hans Steger and Walter Arnold.

Between 1958 and 1964 Dietrich worked as a freelance artist based in Dresden, teaming up at one point in a shared workshop with Wieland Förster. In 1964 he relocated to the north coast, living at Kneese (Bad Sülze), a short distance outside Rostock on its eastern side. He stayed in the Rostock area for nearly four decades, and it was here that he had his most productive years. Several of his works can be found on public display in and around Rostock. Some of the work from his Rostock years was produced in collaboration with Jo Jastram (1928–2011).

With his wife, Magda, he returned to live in Dresden in 2003, where he died in 2015.

== Output (not a complete list) ==
- 1965 "Mutter und Kind", Universitätsklinikum Dresden
- 1966 "Möwenflug", Klinkerbild in der Langen Straße Rostock
- 1970 "Sieben stolze Schwestern küsst das eine Meer", Fountain in Rostock (relocated 2008)
- 1971 "Möwenflug", Bronzeplastik in Warnemünde vor dem Hotel Neptun
- 1976 "Lotsenehrung", Concrete sculpture in Warnemünde by the Light Tower
- 1976/77 mehrere Klinkergiebel, Rostock Evershagen
- 1977 Relief on the podium of the Gedenkstätte der revolutionären Matrosen (Memorial to the revolutionary sailors) in Rostock
- 1979 "Sonnenblumen", Hausgiebelgestaltung in Lichtenhagen (Rostock)
- 1979 "Mecklenburgische Bäuerin", Berlin-Alt-Hohenschönhausen
- 1980 "Brunnen der Lebensfreude" auf dem Universitätsplatz (Rostock) gemeinsam mit dem Bildhauer Jo Jastram
- 1985 "Frau am Fenster", Terrakottafigur am Fünfgiebelhaus in Rostock
- 1985 Relief "Bodenreform", Dorf Mecklenburg
- 1986 Ehrenmal für die Opfer des Faschismus in Bad Doberan in der Nähe des Münsters
- 1988 Satirische Plastik über das Auto, Kopenhagen
- 1994 Marktbrunnen, Marlow
- 1994 Sandsteinstele Salzstadt, Bad Sülze
