= Hans Steger =

Hans Steger may refer to:

- Hans Steger (sculptor), German sculptor
- Hans Ulrich Steger, Swiss caricaturist, children's author and artist
