= Jo Jastram =

German sculptor

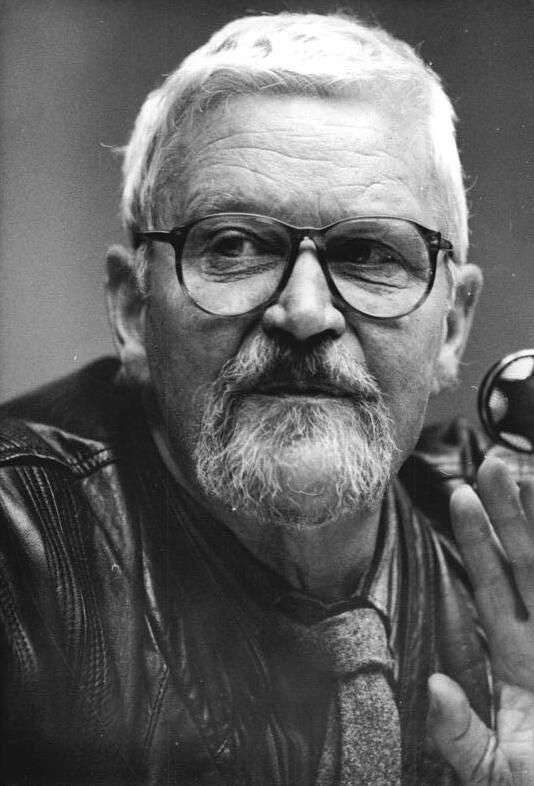
- Jo Jastram (1990)
- Born: Joachim Jastram; 4 September 1928; Rostock, Germany
- Died: 7 January 2011 (aged 82); Ribnitz-Damgarten, Germany
- Occupation: Sculptor
- Spouse: Inge Jastram
- Children: Susanne Rast; Matthias Jastram; Michael Jastram; Jan Jastram

Joachim Jastram (4 September 1928 – 7 January 2011) was a German sculptor.

== Life ==
=== Early years ===
Jo Jastram was born in Rostock close to Germany's Baltic Sea (East Sea / Ostsee) coast. His father was a teacher. He attended the St George School in Rostock where contemporaries included Walter Kempowski. He began drawing at an early age, receiving encouragement from his teacher, the artist Thuro Balzer. Jo Jastram reached his seventeenth birthday a few months before the end of the war and was drafted into the Volkssturm which led to a period as an American prisoner of war. After the war he worked in forestry and then as a trainee well-digger before switching to wood carving. This was followed by a period of study at the Technical School for Wood-art at distant Empfertshausen, in the south-west of the Soviet occupation zone of what remained of Germany, an area now in the process of becoming the stand-alone German Democratic Republic, politically separated both from what the west and from the lands to the east of the Oder-Neisse line, now mostly incorporated into Poland and the Soviet Union as part of a larger post-war redrawing of the frontiers in northern-central Europe. During this time, in 1949 Jastram joined the young country's National Democratic Party (NDPD). Still in the south of East Germany, Jastram then in 1951 transferred to Dresden where he attended the Fine Arts Academy, studying under Walter Arnold, before moving on again in 1954 to the Fine Arts Academy at Berlin-Weißensee where he was taught by Heinrich Drake.

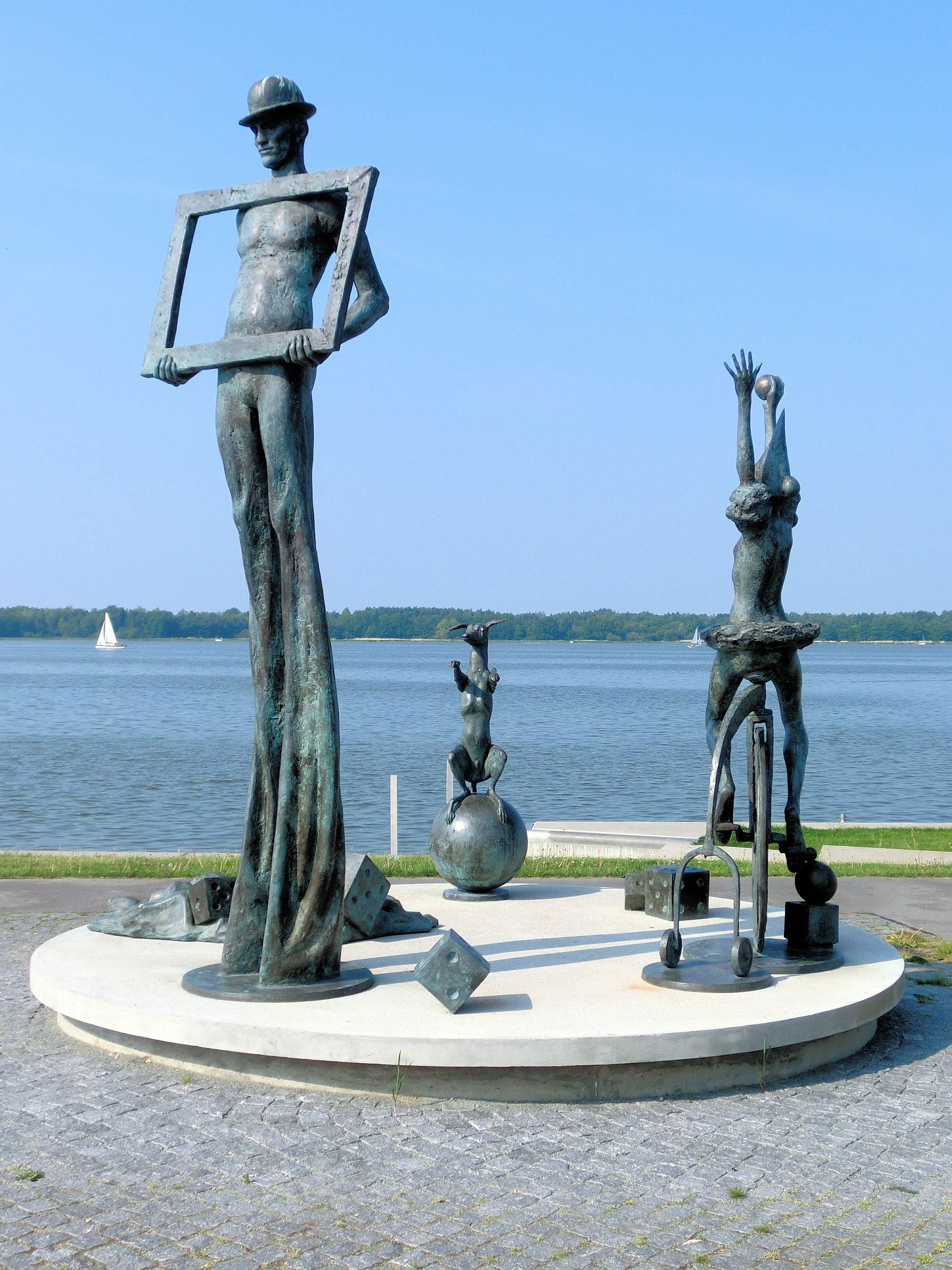
"Der Zirkus kommt" ("The circus is coming")

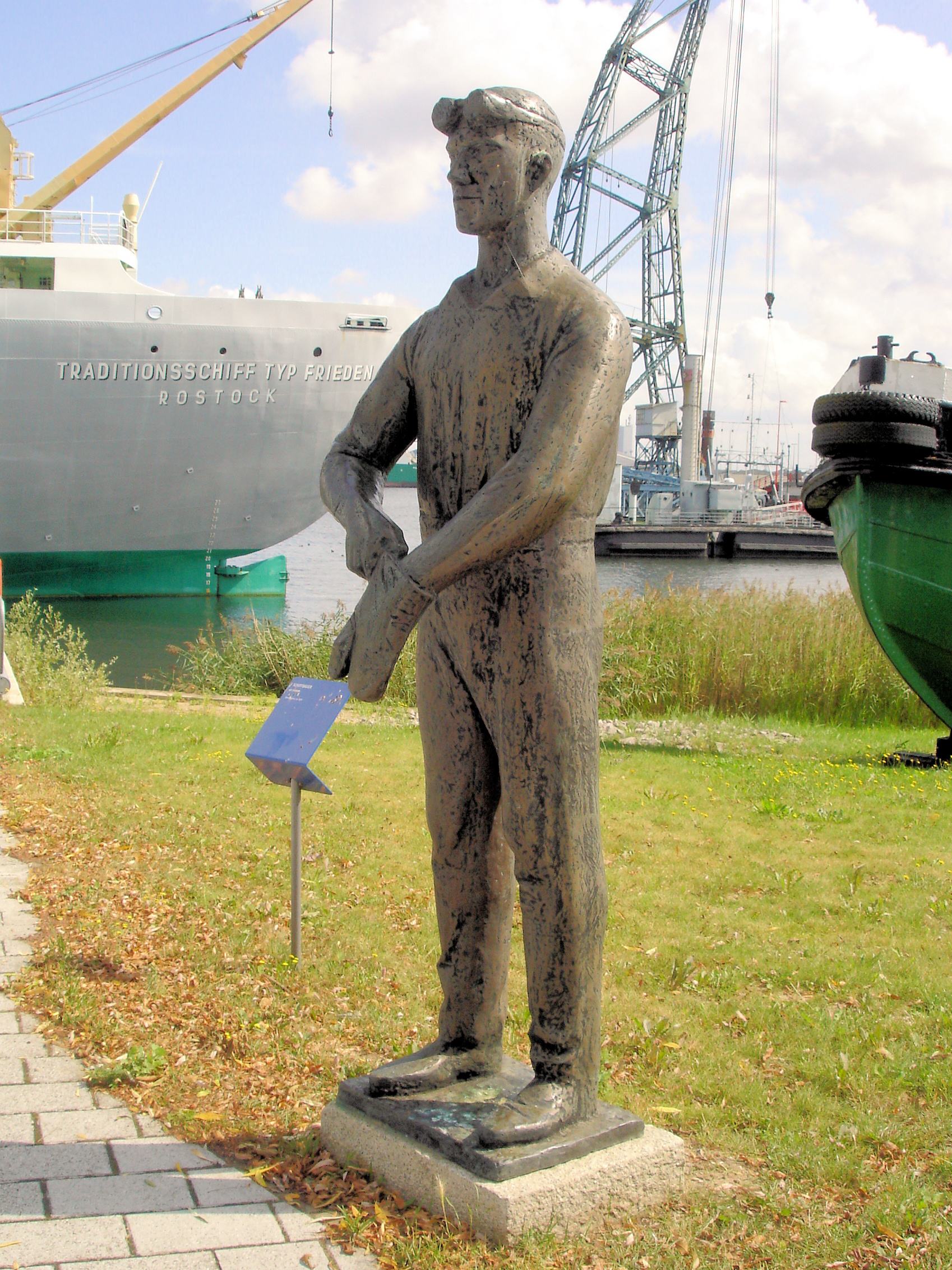
"Schweisser" ("Welder")

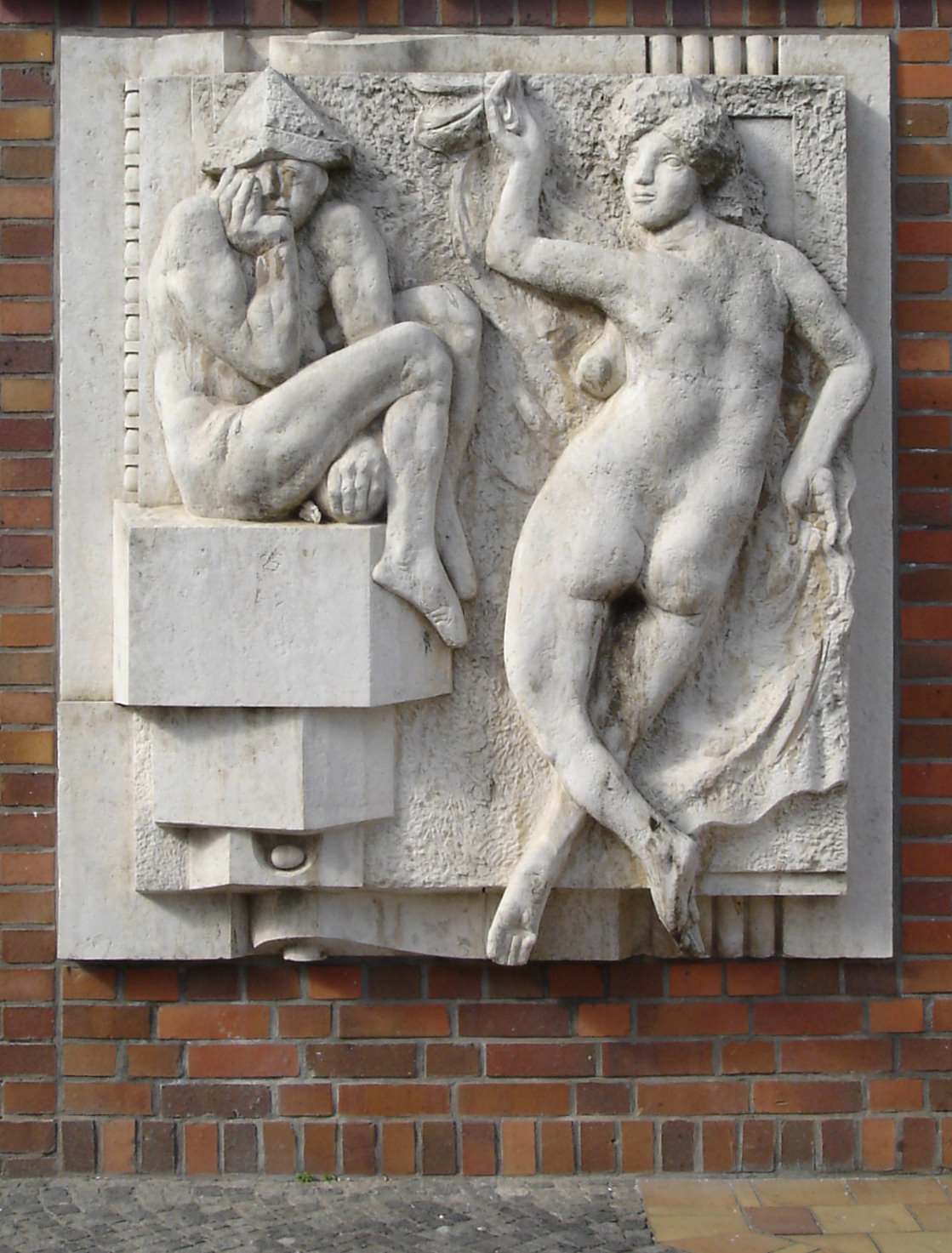

=== The freelancer ===
The period of study in Berlin was rewarded with a Diploma in 1956, after which Jo Jastram returned to Rostock where he worked as a free-lance sculptor. However, from 1973 he moved with his wife and children to the much smaller settlement of Kneese (now administratively part of Marlow), some 30 km (20 miles) to the East of Rostock. Kneese now became the focus of his life and creative work until his sudden death 38 years later.

=== Teaching ===
In 1964 he took a teaching position at the nearby Ernst Moritz Arndt University at Greifswald. Between 1980 and 1986 he held a teaching post and a professorship at the Fine Arts Academy at Berlin-Weißensee. In the event this gave him significant involvement in the teaching of the next generation of artists, not excluding his son Michael Jastram.

=== Memberships ===
In 1956 he joined the East German Visual Artists' League (VBK / Verband Bildender Künstler der DDR), and in 1974 he became the organisation's regional chairman for the Rostock District. The VBK failed to survive the political changes of 1989/90 in its existing form, but in 1990 Joachim Jastram joined the regional Mecklenburg-Vorpommern Artists' League, part of the national Federal [German] League of Visual Artists. In 1983 he became Chairman of the Ernst Berlach working group at the East German Culture League (Kulturbund). He also, in 1983, became a member of the East German Arts Academy, retiring from its successor body, the Berlin Academy of Arts, only in 1995.

=== Foreign travel ===
Membership of the country's cultural elite is evidenced by travel opportunities not available to the average citizen. In 1961 Jo Jastram undertook a study tour to Uzbekistan, then a part of the Soviet Union. A study tour to Mongolia followed in 1965, and then in 1966 there was another such tour to the USSR, this time to Siberia. A tour in 1967 took him to Poland via Scandinavia, and also included Czechoslovakia. He also visited Cuba. In 1975 he was President of the International Committee of the Biennale of Baltic States, a cultural forum held in Rostock, and involving participants from the Scandinavian countries and Finland along with the Soviet Union (of which Latvia, Estonia and Lithuania were then constituent territories). 1976 saw him undertake another study tour, this time taking in Tallinn and Leningrad. In 1979 he visited Italy. In 1981 and again in 1983 he undertook working visits to Ethiopia and he returned to Addis Abeba in (and after) 1988, while study tours within Europe later in the 1980s took in Sweden and even Great Britain.

=== After the changes ===
By the time the Berlin Wall was breached in November 1989, Jo Jastram had recently celebrated his sixty-first birthday. An end to the (west facing) isolationism that had characterised the German Democratic Republic now meant that his work now became known to a wider audience across Germany and internationally. During the next few years there were exhibitions in Oslo, Copenhagen, Helsinki, Damascus and Warsaw. There was also a big celebration exhibition in his birth city, Rostock, in 2008 on the occasion of his 75th birthday. Nor did Jastram lose his taste for travel, returning again to Ethiopia in 1998 and visiting India, Yemen and Sri Lanka between 1996 and 2009.

== Legacy ==
Along with the students he had taught, Joachim Jastram left a tangible legacy in the form of sculpture, much of which remains accessible. He produced an abundance of portraits, figurative images of humans and other animals as well as work for public spaces such as wells, church doors, reliefs and memorials. He created a wall frieze in 1971 for the prestigious Hotel Neptun in Warnemünde, and in 1991 he produced a statue of Mendelssohn for the Gewandhaus (concert hall) in Leipzig.

His best known works include "Fountain of the Joy of Life" ("Brunnen der Lebensfreude") in Rostock's University Square, produced in 1978 jointly with Reinhard Dietrich and Great African Journeys" ("Große afrikanische Reise") which since 2008 has adorned the old harbour in Rostock. His last work for a public space is a group of figures entitled "The Circus is coming" ("Der Zirkus kommt") produced with Susanne Rast (his daughter) and installed on the shoreside promenade at Ribnitz in 2009.

== Awards and honours ==
- 1972 Art Prize of the German Democratic Republic
- 1973 National Prize of East Germany
- 1984 National Prize of East Germany
- 1988 Patriotic Order of Merit in gold
- 2004 Wernigerode Arts prize winner
