= Skulpturensammlung =

Sculpture collection in Dresden, Germany

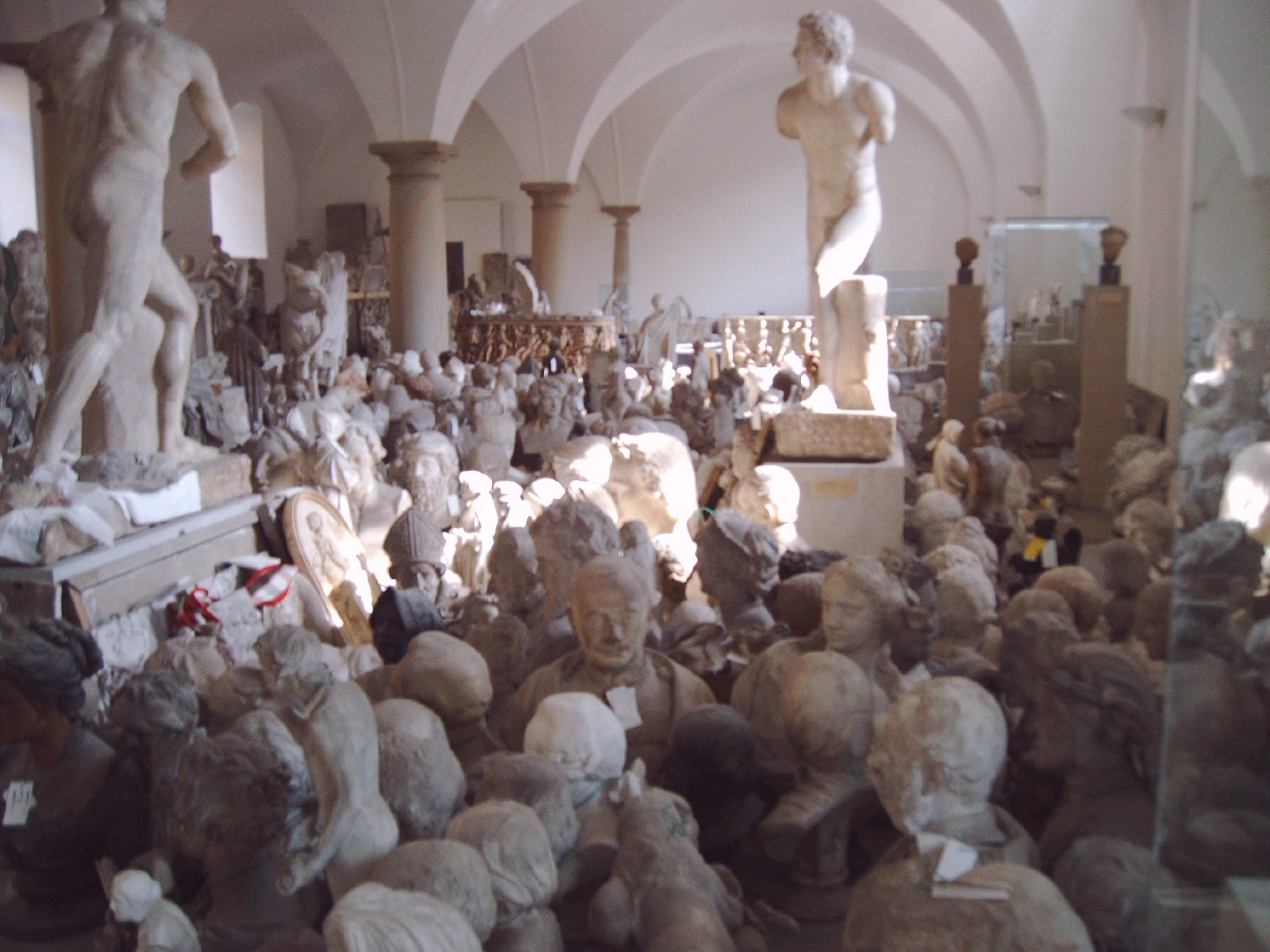
- View of the plaster casts in 2003
- Interactive fullscreen map
- Location: Dresden, Germany
- Coordinates: 51°03′07″N 13°44′40″E

The Skulpturensammlung (English: Sculpture Collection) is part of the Staatliche Kunstsammlungen Dresden (Dresden State Art Collections). It is located in the Albertinum in Dresden.

The collection of the Dresden Skulpturensammlung ranges in age more than five millennia, from classical antiquity to the art of the Renaissance, Baroque, and Expressionism until the 21st century. Sculptures from the likes of Polycletus to Giambologna and Permoser, and from Rodin to Lehmbruck are included in the collection.

== History ==
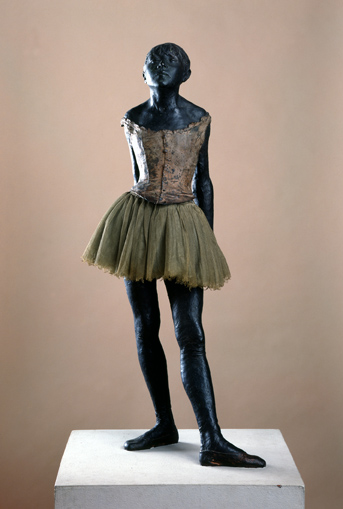
Edgar Degas, Little Dancer of Fourteen Years

The origins of the museum can be traced back to the Kunstkammer founded in 1560. However, it was August the Strong who established the “Collection of Antique and Modern Sculptures” and turned Dresden into a centre of Baroque architecture and sculpture.

After the arrival of antiquities from Rome at the end of 1729, the collection was displayed in the palace in the Großer Garten, surrounded by masterpieces of contemporary sculpture. In 1786 the collection was rearranged and exhibited in the Japanisches Palais. After the archaeologist Georg Treu (1843–1921) took over as director of the museum in 1882, the collection particularly flourished. Over the three decades of his tenure, Treu instituted a systematic acquisitions policy to build up the collection. The Renaissance Zeughaus (Arsenal) on the Brühlsche Terrasse was converted for use as a museum and in 1889 the Antiquities Collection was able to move into the building, which was thereafter called the Albertinum. Treu continued the tradition of displaying antiquities alongside contemporary works. The collection was the first to acquire numerous works by Auguste Rodin and Constantin Meunier in Germany.

Although the Albertinum was partially destroyed in February 1945, most of the collection survived the Second World War, but for some large plaster casts. Almost all the original sculptures were taken to the Soviet Union, but were returned to Dresden in 1958. Following the restoration and refurbishment of the Albertinum, the Skulpturensammlung and the Galerie Neue Meister will only now display works from the Romantic period to the present day. The antiquities will be on view in display storerooms until they are able to move back into their old home in a few years’ time. The Osthalle (eastern wing) of the Semperbau was designed in the mid-19th century by Gottfried Semper specifically for the antique sculpture collection.

== Exhibition ==
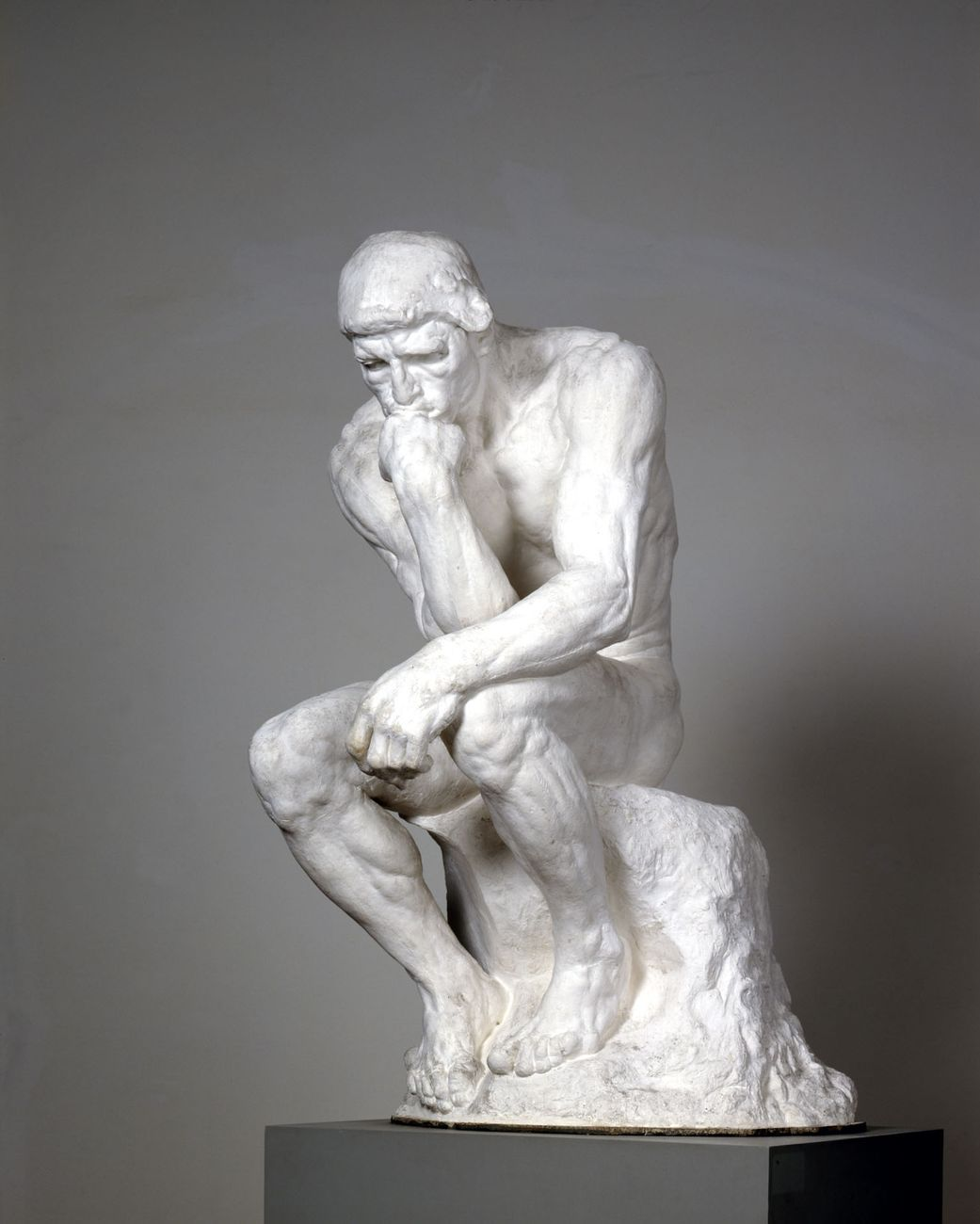
Auguste Rodin, The Thinker

The exhibition of the Skulpturensammlung begins with works by the French sculptor Auguste Rodin. He heralded the age of modern statuary and sculpture and is regarded as the forerunner of the numerous styles developed during the 20th century. The sculpture of the classical modern period and post-1945 exhibited in the Albertinum amplifies Rodin’s principle of the subjectivity of art. This principle continues to be visible within the contemporary sculpture of today. The exhibition also pays particular attention to art created during the GDR era through works by artists such as Wieland Förster, Werner Stötzer, and Helmut Heinze.

The Albertinum now includes two new galleries displaying works of a specific theme. The Klingersaal was designed by the Skulpturensammlung and the Galerie Neue Meister as a space in which both sculpture and paintings can be harmoniously exhibited together. The Klingersaal is devoted to the art of the late 19th century movement the ‘Fin de siècle’. The ‘Fin de Siècle’ movement is illustrated through various works by Arnold Böcklin and Max Klinger to those of Franz von Stuck and Sascha Schneider. The Mosaiksaal is dedicated to the theme of morality, which is exemplified by sculptures from the Classicist period with the particular emphasis of those by Ernst Rietschel.

The Skulpturensammlung holds works dating from more than five millennia: from the cultures of classical antiquity to the various periods of European statuary from the early Middle Ages to the sculpture of today. In a few years’ time, the core holdings of the collection, with the inclusion of the Antiquities Collection (comprising sculptures such as the “Dresden Boy”, as well as vases, bronzes, and terracotta), will be presented in a new exhibition within the Osthalle (eastern wing) of the Semper Building. The Osthalle was originally designed by Gottfried Semper to house the classical sculpture collection. Until that time, visitors may get a preview of the future exhibition by looking in the experimental display storeroom on the ground floor of the Albertinum, where a selection of the Antiquities Collection is currently on display.

== See also ==
- List of museums in Saxony
