= Gerd Jaeger =

German painter and sculptor (1927–2019)

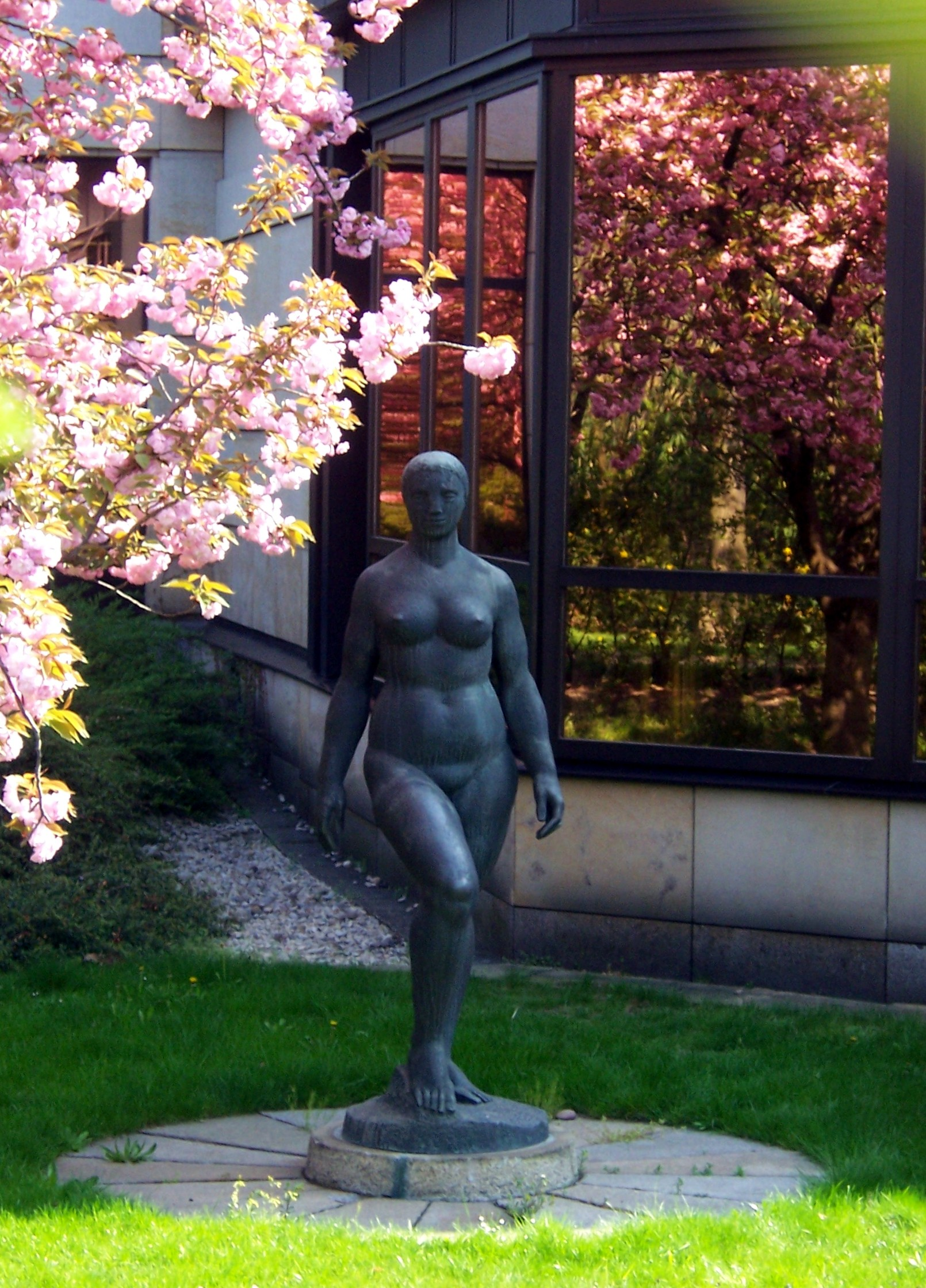
Female nude ("Weiblicher Akt") by Gerd Jaeger Hotel Bellevue, Dresden

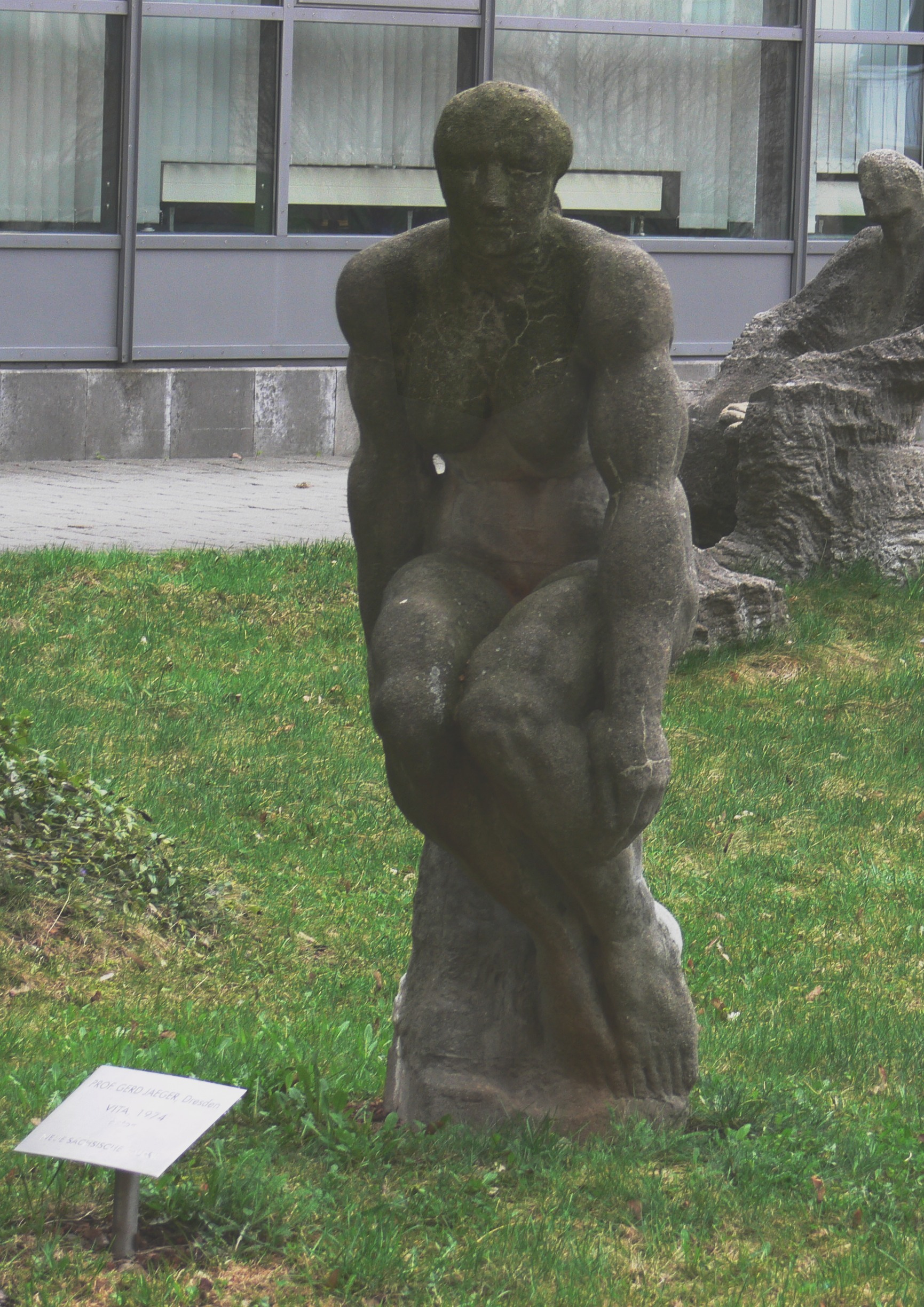
Life ("Vita") by Gerd Jaeger (1974) Volksbank Chemnitz, on long term loan from the New Saxony Gallery in Chemnitz

Gerd Jaeger (16 September 1927 – 10 January 2019) was a German sculptor and painter.

== Life ==
Gerd Jaeger was born in Förderstedt, a small village near the lignite mines in the countryside south of Magdeburg. In 1943, aged 16, he was conscripted for military service, assigned initially to airforce support (Luftwaffenhelfer) and then quite soon, as a young soldier, sent to fight on the Russian front. He returned home only in 1949 having spent most of the intervening period as a prisoner of war. 1949 was the year in which the entire central portion of Germany, till that point administered as the Soviet occupation zone, was hurriedly relaunched as the Soviet sponsored German Democratic Republic (East Germany).

He now returned to the series of sketches on which he had embarked in 1943, centred on the horrors of war: the theme was one of which he would find himself unable to let go for decades. In the Autumn/Fall of 1949 he enrolled at the College of Architecture and Fine Arts ("Hochschule für Architektur und Bauwesen") at Weimar. His teachers included Martin Domke and Otto Herbig. However, the campus at Weimar was undergoing radical reconfiguration at this time in response to new government priorities, which in effect amounted a to a closing down, during 1951/52, of what had been the College of Architecture and Fine Arts. By that time Jaeger had moved on to Dresden, enrolling at the prestigious Fine Arts Academy. There his teachers included the sculptors Eugen Hoffmann, Max Schwimmer and Walter Arnold. It was during this timethat he decided to make sculpture the focus of his subsequent career. In 1963 Jaeger himself became a teacher at the academy, receiving his professorship in 1971. His own students over the next few years included many of the more noteworthy of the East German sculptors of the next generation, including Wolf-Eike Kuntsche, Frank Maasdorf, Detlef Reinemer, Klaus-Michael Stephan, Hartmut Bonk, Tobias Stengel, Matthias Jackisch and, probably the best known of them, Wieland Förster.

His first significant sculptures date back to 1952 ("Head of a woman" / "Frauenkopf") already indicated an individuality beyond the standard art college precepts, and he continued to develop his style through his time as a student. Much of Jaeger's own most significant sculptural output stemmed from his own early student years at Dresden. It involved small and mid-sized bronze forms including statuettes and torsos, and displays of physicality in images of dancers, sporting figures and bathers. Despite the political correctness of those times, there is a surprising shortage of workers and peasants, but it is impossible to avoid the male nude figures. This phase of his work, which lasted well into the 1960s, can be seen as a great sigh of relief in protracted reaction to his own experiences of war and imprisonment. But that did not preclude more conventional manifestations of government mandated good taste, such as "Prehistoric torso" ("Prähistorischer Torso") and ("Head of a man" "Männliche Kopf") - both plaster casts from 1958.

Four larger than life limestone figures for a fountain in Eisenhüttenstadt (1960), both in terms of the materials used and in terms of their scale and function, brought him back into the East German cultural mainstream. In 1965 he created the near life sized cement sculpture "Dead Youth" ("Toter Knabe") for the Dresden Memorial which in terms of theme and of material used successfully anticipated subsequent trends.

Imposing female figures and torsos continued to feature in his output during the 1960s and 70s, along with portrait works ("Striding" / "Schreitende", 1963; "Portrait of Renate" / ""Porträt Renate"", 1977; "Aphrodite-Torso" 1982/83)). Working through the trauma of war continued as a parallel theme, with overtly tragic works becoming more frequent, direct and uncompromising during the 1970s. A piece like "End of a Youth" ("Ende einer Jugend"), a cement casting of 1979/80, was characteristic of much of his work at this time, with its suppressed hurt, representing the incorporation of various influences to create an unmistakable Jaeger style, which was also powerfully expressed in his "Hommage to Riemenschneider" ("Hommage à Riemenschneider") the next year. His torsos also grew more powerful, with natural curves and sexual features rounded and exaggerated, making them more expressive.

Most of Jaeger's work was produced in East Germany before reunification. It carries a spirit of hope, but not of great optimism, far less of celebration. That also applies to the rather smaller number of his works that ended up in public spaces. His five bronze doors depicting the history of the city of Dresden nevertheless survive as one element of the city's socialist-era Palace of Culture (Kulturpalast) of enduring merit. His cement castings "Vita" ("Life") from 1974 can be seen in Chemnitz, Suhl and Coswig (just outside Dresden). His "Squatting giant" (""Große Hockende"), using the same material and produced in the same year, is one of the artworks still featured in Dresden's Münchner Platz. These and other similar works should still have a future.

In his later 60s Jaeger found he no longer had the strength in his hands to produce the large scale works that had been the mainstay of his output during the previous four decades. Beginning in 1994/95 he began producing smaller sculpted figures, water colours, and, most prominently, oil paintings.

== Awards and honours (selection) ==
- 1970 Martin Andersen Nexö Arts Prize from the city of Dresden
- 1981 Art Prize of the German Democratic Republic
- 1987 Schwabinger Art Prize (Munich)
