= Wieland Förster =

German sculptor and painter (born 1930)

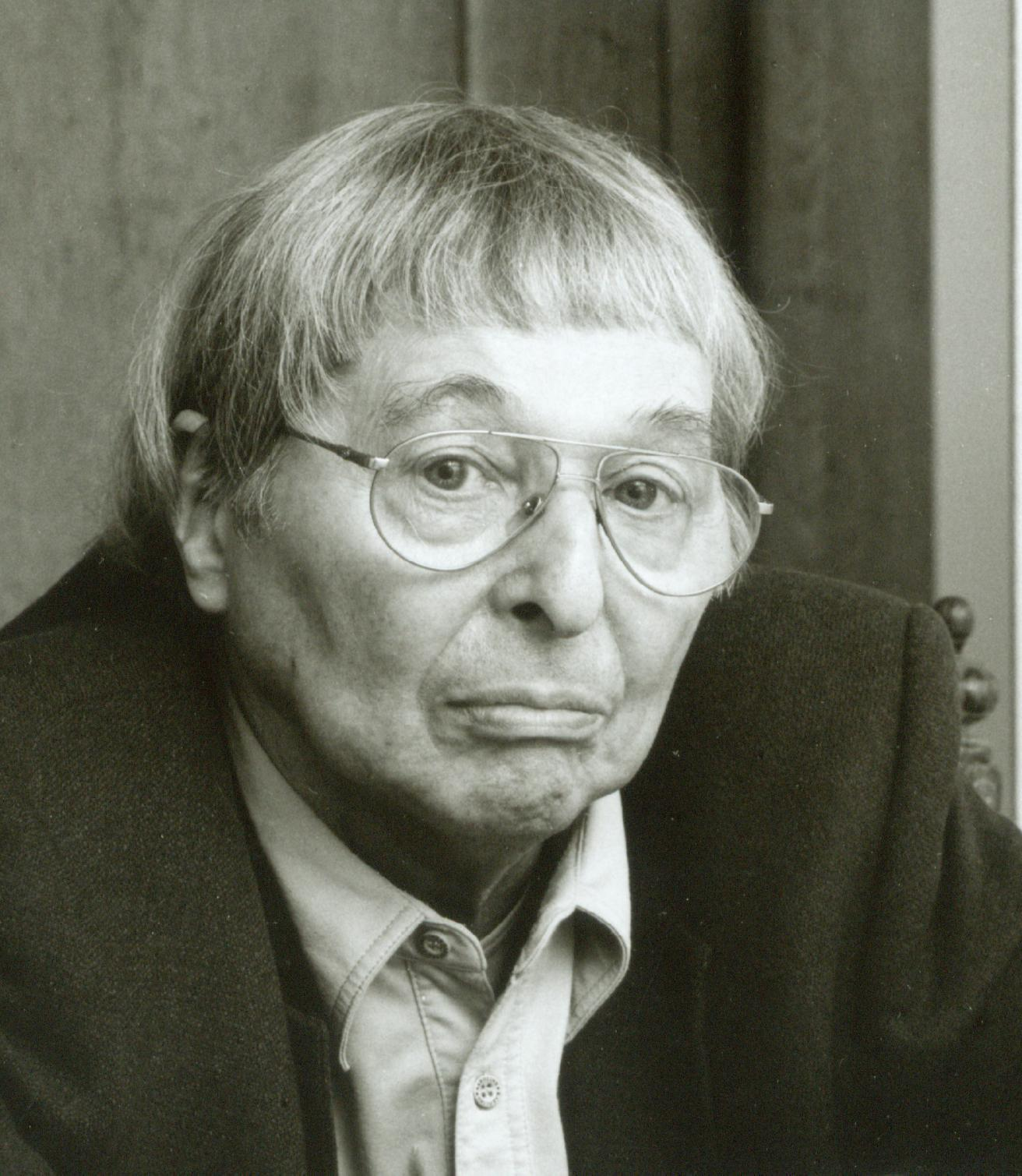
Wieland Förster

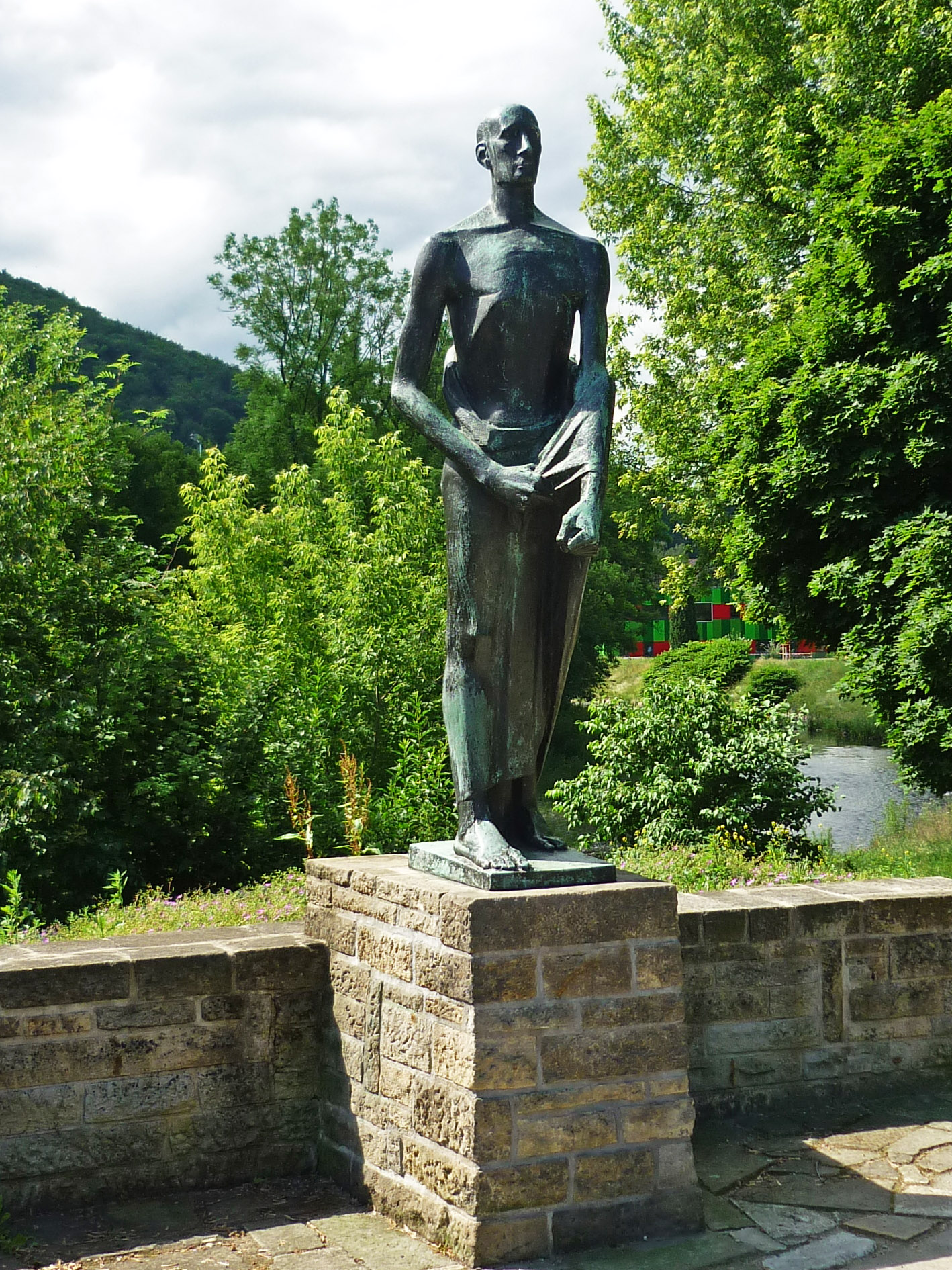
Victims of Fascism memorial at Freital-Döhlen

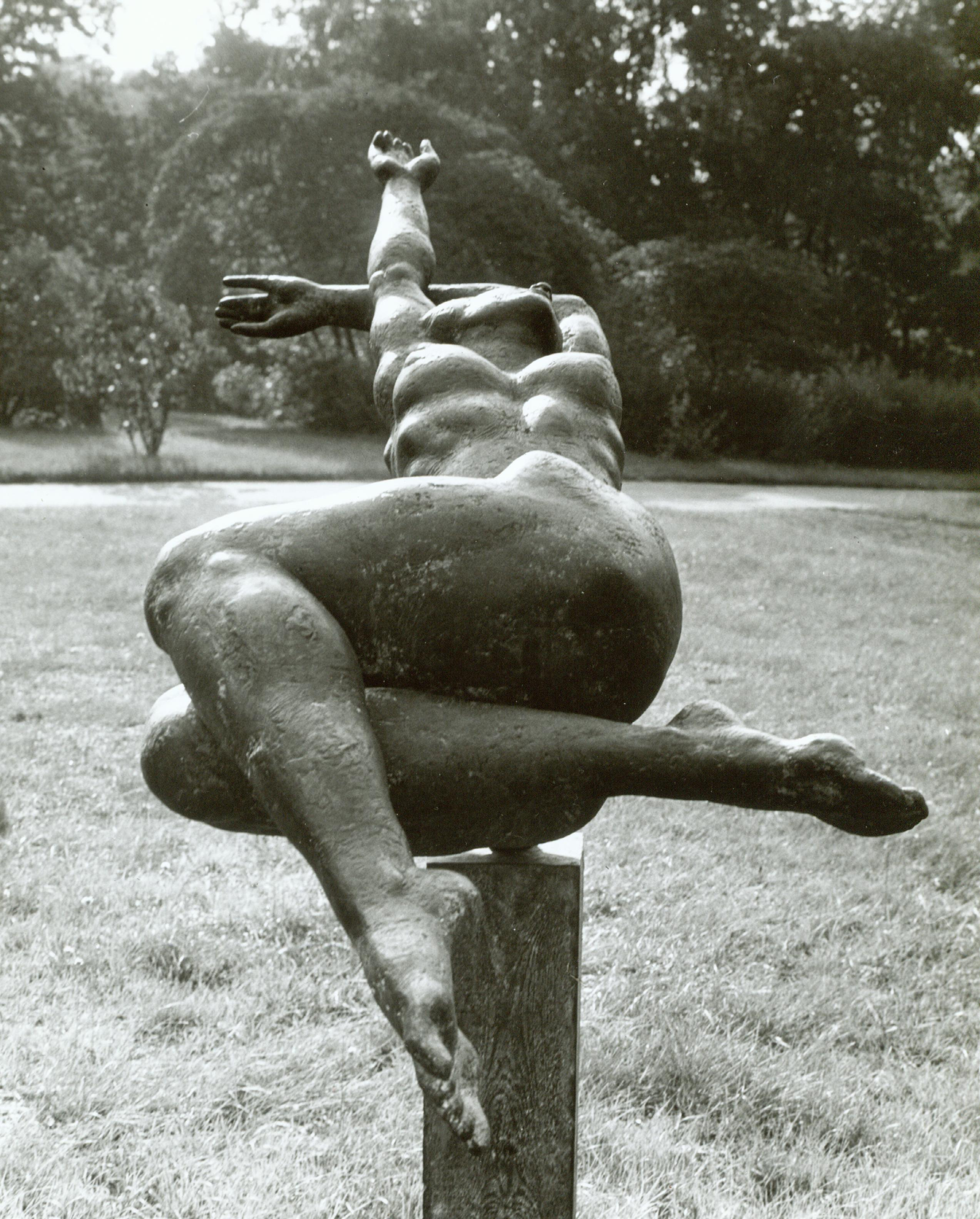
Great bather

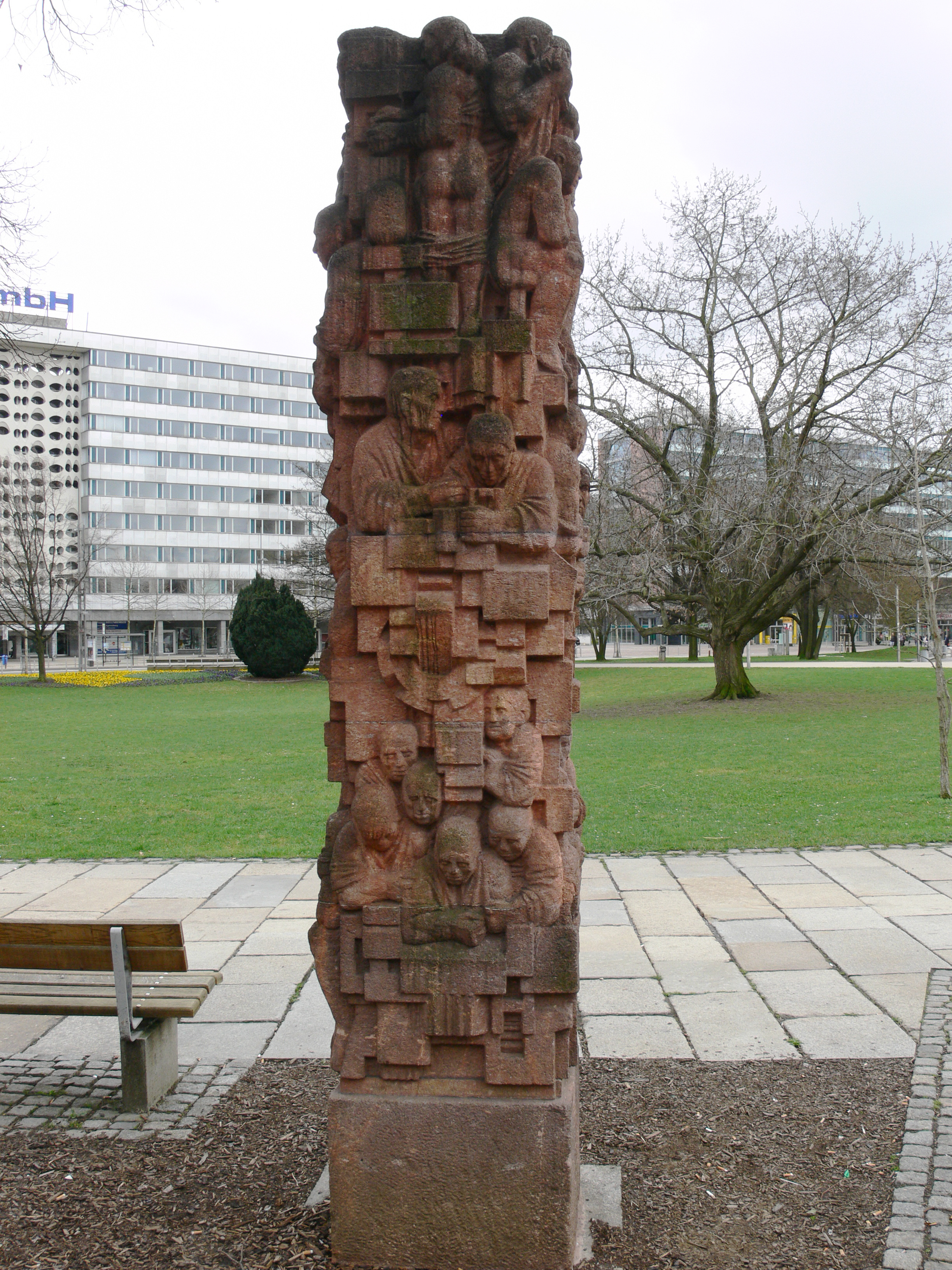
Scholarship (Chemnitz)

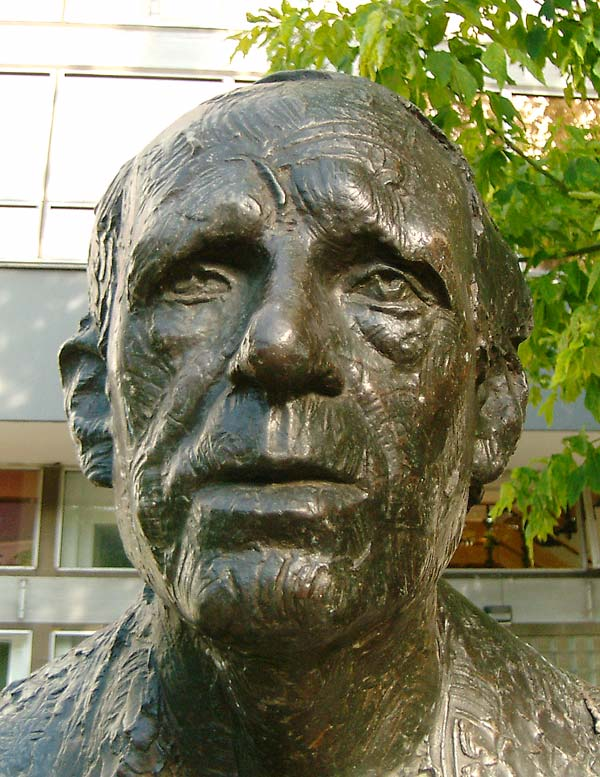
Heinrich Böll (Prenzlauer Berg, Berlin)

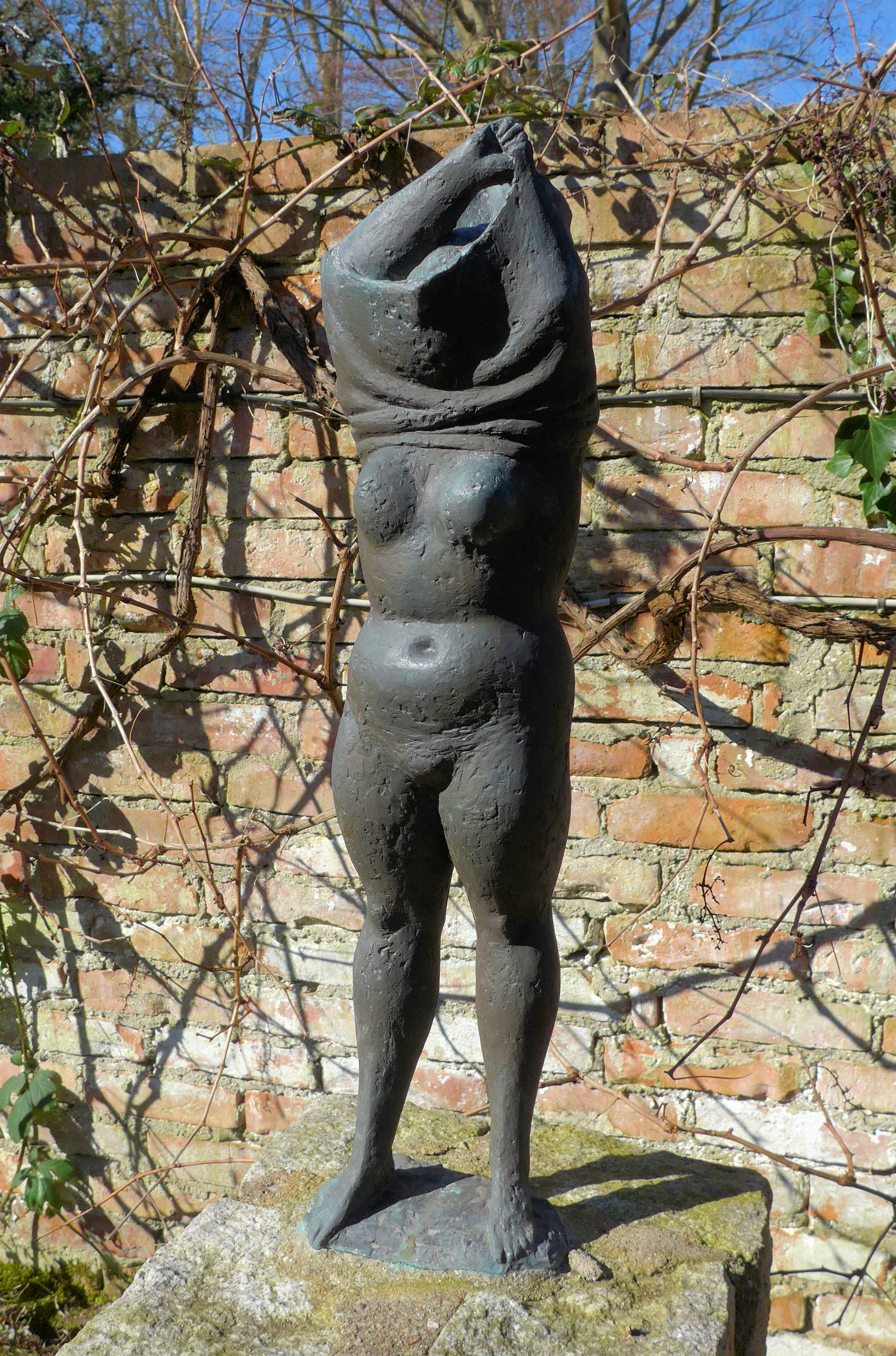
Removing shirt

Wieland Förster (born 12 February 1930) is a German sculptor, artist and writer. A recurring theme of his work is victimhood, reflecting his own youthful experiences during the incineration of Dresden in February 1945 and of the Soviet justice system between 1946 and 1950.

His life has been documented in unusual detail, not least by himself. By 2015 it was reported that the daily diary which he has kept since 1953 had reached its 150th unpublished "volume".

== Life ==
=== Childhood and youth ===
Wieland Förster was born, the youngest of his parents' four children, in Laubegast, a suburb of Dresden. His father was employed in the transport and commercial sectors. In 1935 his father died as a result of wounds sustained during the First World War, leaving his mother to raise the children under conditions of financial hardship. She succeeded in distancing them from Nazi indoctrination. As a school boy, between 1936 and 1944, Wieland rejected the Nazi system and pressures to take part in government sponsored uniformed organisations. In 1944, he took an apprenticeship as a trainee technical draftsman at the Dresden municipal waterworks. Towards the end of 1944, still aged only 14, he was sent for four weeks to a Hitler Youth detention camp. On his release he volunteered for fire-watch duties in order to avoid further unwelcome interruptions to his training and education.

It is reported that he was such a quick learner as an apprentice technical draftsmen that after a year he was "promoted" to a preparatory year for a degree course at the Engineering Academy. He was also conscripted into the local branch of the newly launched German Home Guard ("Volksturm"), and it was as a member of the Home Guard that he experienced the English and American air attacks that destroyed the central districts of the city one day after his fifteenth birthday, on the night of 13 February 1945. In the chaos following the attacks he was able to escape from the Home Guard, remaining in his home district till war ended, formally on 8 May 1945, after which Dresden and the surrounding region of central Germany were administered as the Soviet occupation. Technical draftsmanship was officially designated as women's work, and Wieland was required to undertake hands-on work ("als Rohrleger") in industrial engineering.

On 17 September 1946, he found himself taken in by the police and handed over to the NKVD after a neighbour denounced him on grounds of suspected possession of weapons. The background to the affair was an attempt to make the Förster family exchange their home for rented accommodation, after the German police had blocked an attempt by the Communist authorities to make them pay rent for living in their own home. Wieland was initially sentenced to ten years of forced labour in Siberia, but after three months of nightly interrogation, a Soviet military tribunal reduced the term to 7½ years. On 28 December 1946, he was interned at NKVD "Special Camp" IV, a concentration camp which the authorities had constructed next to the jail at Bautzen. As the camp commanders set about sorting out the prisoners fit for work to be transported to Siberia, a Soviet military doctor determined that Wieland Förster was unfit for work. He was therefore left behind in NKVD "Special Camp" IV. In the aftermath of war the authorities refused to discuss or even to acknowledge the continuing existence of concentration camps in the Soviet part of occupied Germany, but their all too physical presence never became increasingly hard to dispute. By 1950 Förster was in poor general health dangerously ill with Tuberculosis and on 21 January 1950, following a threatened investigation by the International Red Cross, he was the beneficiary of a "backdoor" release, emerging from the camp without identity papers and without any formal pardon or other explanation. Official acknowledgment that he had been a victim of Stalinist persecution followed in 1991.

=== Further study and training ===
Despite having emerged from after nearly four years interned in NKVD "Special Camp" IV, in 1950 Förster was still aged only 20. The previous year, in October 1949, the Soviet occupation zone had been relaunched as the Soviet sponsored German Democratic Republic (East Germany). It was in this new kind of one- party dictatorship, with its principal political and economic structures modelled on those of the Soviet Union itself, that Förster built his life and career over the next four decades. He abandoned his ambition to become a technical draftsman, but nevertheless returned to work with the Dresden municipal waterworks, employed in the planning department till 1953. During these years he was using his spare time to try out various artistic forms of expression, such as writing, music, theatre and advertising, along with the more visual arts. In the Autumn/Fall of 1952 he took part in a public "drawing event" at the Dresden Academy of Fine Arts where the teachers encouraged him to enroll as a student.

He applied to his employers to back his application to sponsor his application to study at the academy, but was turned down for reasons that involved the risk of "Verbürgerlichung" (loosely: "bourgeoisization"). He therefore made the application anyway, on his own responsibility, and was accepted. He was a student at the Dresden Academy of Fine Arts between 1953 and 1958. He began his study of sculpting in 1953, taught by Walter Arnold and Arnold's assistant Gerd Jaeger. Another of his teachers was Hans Steger. The focus of the training at Dresden was on neoclassical form, backed up by compulsory courses in drawing, on use of plaster casts and on nature. The study of anatomy and history of art were also included and required.

By his second year Förster was already establishing contacts with representatives of the officially forbidden "classical modern" art movement. By this time the division of Germany agreed between the Americans and the Soviets at Yalta at the beginning of 1945 had crystallised into a permanent frontier, but the border between the two Germanies was still relatively porous, especially between West Berlin and the surrounding territories governed as East Germany, and Förster took the opportunity to visit Bernhard Heiliger in the west. Walter Arnold, himself a consummate hands-on craftsman, helped a few of his students, whom he regarded as politically reliable, to deepen their understanding on the essential elements in figurative sculpture, by gaining experience with the works of the westerners Hermann Haller and Charles Despiau. In his third year, required to produce a "portrait from a 'photo", Förster chose as his subject Bertolt Brecht, a long-standing icon of the German intellectual left but nevertheless at this stage ostracised by the authorities. In order to accomplish his course objective he was permitted, a few weeks before Brecht's death in 1956, to attend a rehearsal of Life of Galileo, being staged by the Berliner Ensemble (theatre company).

He received his degree in 1958 he applied for a three-year Master Course at the Arts Academy in East Berlin, hoping to study with Gustav Seitz. However, it was becoming progressively more impractical for Seitz to sustain a life-style that involved pursuing a career simultaneously in West and East Germany, and 1958 was the year in which he opted to base himself in Hamburg (in the west).In order to be able to remain in Berlin, and following the recommendation of Seitz, Förster now hesitantly but successfully applied to become a Master Student ("Meisterschüler") with Fritz Cremer.

After just eighteen months his time as a Master Student of Cremer was prematurely terminated in connection with the increasingly heated debate then emerging on the subject of Formalism. He was permitted to use a workshop at the academy to complete his Life-sized plus group of figures "Völkerfreundschaft unter Studenten" (literally "People's friendship between students") which won the TU Dresden prize in 1961/62.

=== Retreat and recovery ===
In 1961 Wieland Förster set himself up in a Berlin shop building which became his studio. For some years he lived and worked here as a virtual hermit, visited by his family and a couple of close friends, notably Erich Arendt and Franz Fühmann. The authorities did not endorse his self-imposed exile but nor, at least initially, do they appear to have interfered. His only child, Eva Förster, was born in Berlin's Prenzlauer Berg quarter in 1968. From the time she was six years old her father insisted that she should keep a daily diary, a habit through which she developed a succinct writing style: she grew up to become a theatre critic, writer and lyricist-poet. Between 1968 and 1972, the authorities became disruptive. Förster was banned from exhibiting his works between 1968 and 1973, and he was subjected to surveillance techniques that became increasingly intrusive. In the absence of membership of the government approved professional association it became hard to obtain materials, and for some time he operated without an official tax payer reference number. His perceived attitude in the great Formalism debate and his artistic style earned official condemnation. In the end, in December 1972, working under conditions of increasing privation from which his health suffered, he was able to arrange an evidently candid meeting with Konrad Wolf, the politically well connected president of the National Arts Academy, at which he spelled out his situation. The timing was propitious, in that the country's new leader, Erich Honecker, was cautiously trying to move the East German government beyond the unrelenting inflexibility of his predecessor. The exhibitions ban was lifted, and Förster found himself elected to membership of the National Arts Academy. More generally, from now on, till the demise of the East German state in 1989/90, he became a (semi-detached and unconventional) member of the artistic establishment: his relationship with the state now reflected a certain level of mutual acceptance bordering on respect.

Between 1979 and 1990 he served as fifth vice-president, with responsibility for the training of Master Students ("Meisterschüler") at the National Arts Academy. In 1985 he was appointed to a professorship. Since 1991 he has also been a member of PEN Centre Germany. However, 1991 was also the year in which he resigned from the (formerly East German) National Arts Academy in protest at the inadequacy of the institution's willingness to investigate and disclose its role under the East German dictatorship. Following reunification, in 1991 he was obliged to relocate from his 16 M2 studio to a small back yard which is where, despite by now suffering from serious heart disease, much of his later work was produced. For his larger sandstone sculptures he used a piece of land he had acquired (and where he still lives) at Wensickendorf near Oranienburg, to the north of Berlin.

In 1992 or 2010 the National Arts Academy took over the Wieland Förster Archive, comprising many pages his correspondence with fellow artists and with the authorities in East Germany. In 1996 he was a founding member of the Saxony Arts Academy in Dresden, to which in 2001 he agreed to donate 58 sculptures.

== Output ==
Förster was producing lithographic work from 1960. His first etchings and sculptures for public spaces appeared in 1962. During the years that followed he took several working trips abroad. His 1967 stay in Tunisia was particularly important in influencing his later work. However, foreign travel was a privilege rather than a right, and between 1968 and 1973 governmental agencies imposed various ideologically based blockages including the ban on exhibiting. Grudging rehabilitation, backed by Konrad Wolf, followed in 1974, when he was admitted to the National Arts Academy, and he was almost immediately able to stage his first major exhibition (organised by Rudolf Tschäpe) in Potsdam in the former observatory building on the Telegraph Hill.

Wieland Förster still works as a visual artist. Additionally, since the 1970s he has published a series of books and articles reflecting aspects of his own artistic creations.

== Awards and honours ==
not necessarily a complete list

- 1966: Will Lammert Prize of the German Arts Academy, Berlin
- 1973: Kunstpreis der DDR
- 1974: Käthe Kollwitz Prize of the National Arts Academy, Berlin
- 1976: National Prize of the German Democratic Republic for arts and literature, 3rd class
- 1977: Kleist Arts City Prize from Frankfurt (Oder)
- 1978: Arts Prize of the Trades Union Confederation
- 1983: National Prize of the German Democratic Republic for arts and literature, 2nd class
- 1996: Arts Prize of the Saxon capital, Dresden
- 2000: Order of Merit of the Federal Republic of Germany 1st class
- 2009: Brandenburg Arts Prize for life's achievement
- 2010: Honorary doctorate from the Faculty of Philosophy Universität Potsdam
- 2012: Order of Merit of Brandenburg
