= Albert Fraenkel =

German physician (1864 - 1938)

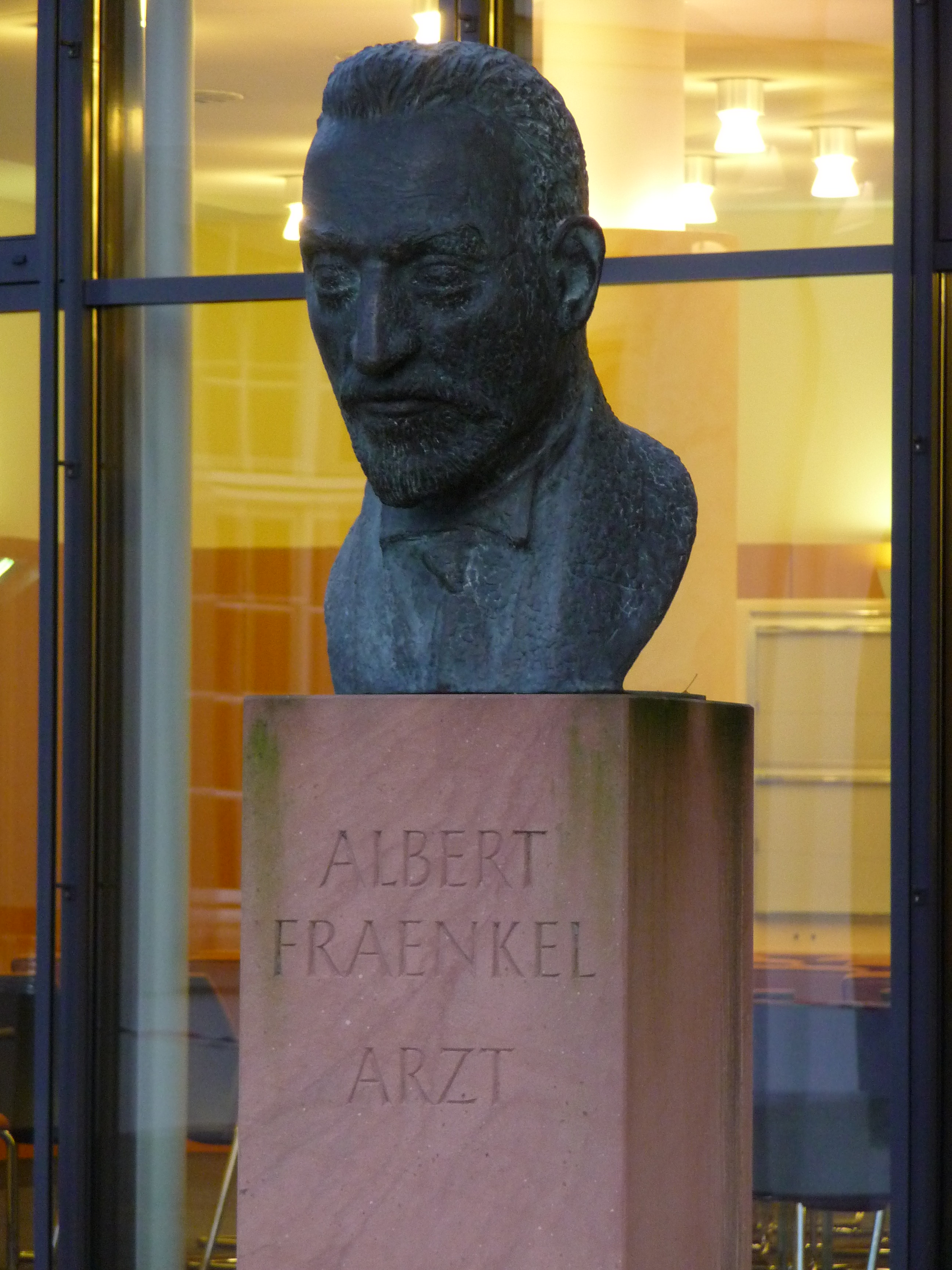
Bust of Albert Fraenkel by Helmut Heinze, Heidelberg 2004.

Julius Albert Fraenkel (3 June 1864 – 22 December 1938) was a German physician who helped establish Streptococcus pneumoniae as a cause of bacterial pneumonia and championed intravenous ouabain for use in heart failure. The Albert-Fraenkel-Plakette (Albert Fraenkel award) is given to German-speaking cardiologists who have excelled in the field.

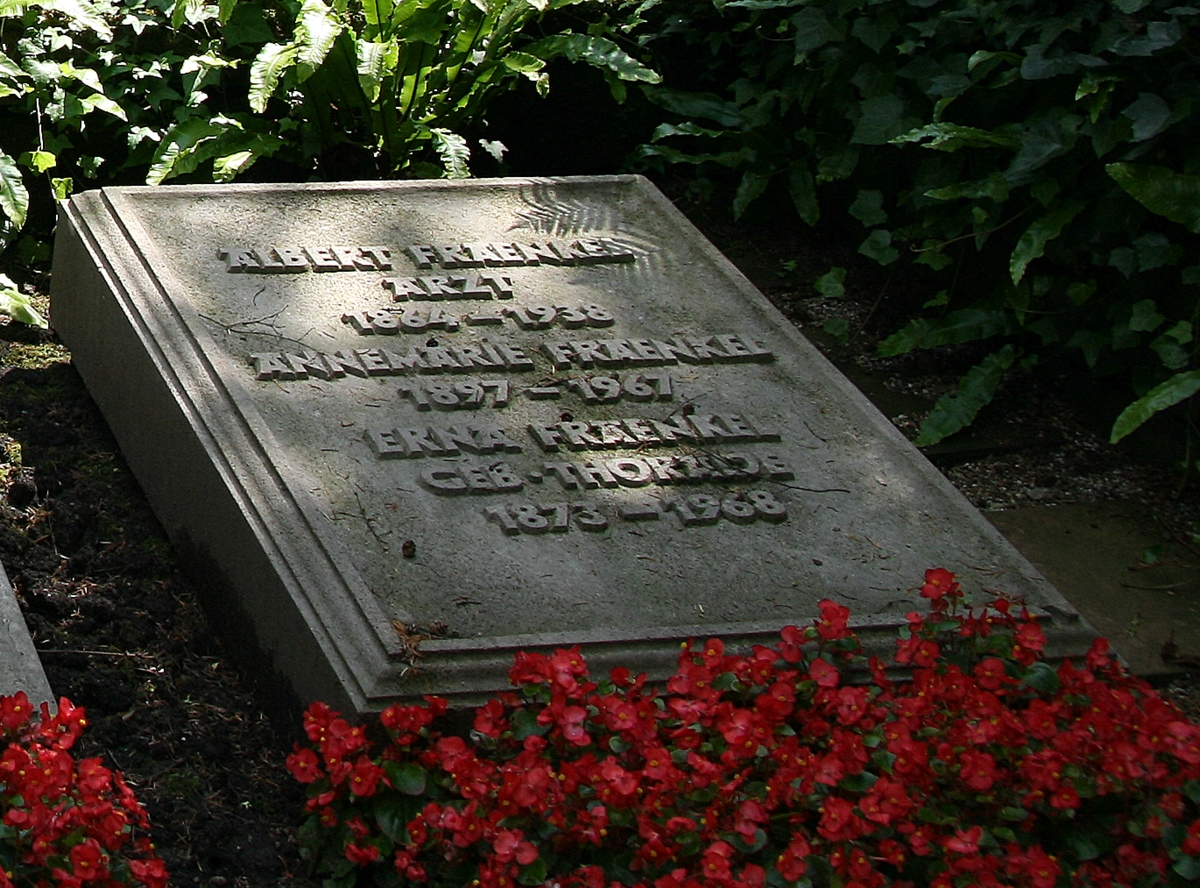
His grave in Heidelberg

Born in 1864 in Mußbach an der Weinstraße, Albert was the son of a Jewish merchant. He studied medicine in Munich and Strasbourg (then the German city of Straßburg) in the 1880s. He initially practiced internal medicine and obstetrics, but turned to studying diseases of the lungs after suffering from tuberculosis. He established a tuberculosis sanatorium at Badenweiler in the Black Forest. Fraenkel also first used g-Strophanthin (ouabain) in heart failure, a practice which continues to be advocated by some practitioners in Germany.

Fraenkel's later life was marred by Adolf Hitler's rise to power in Germany. He was stripped of his position as professor at Heidelberg in 1933 and his license to practice medicine was revoked in 1938, three months before his death.
