= Etha Richter =

German sculptor (1883–1977)

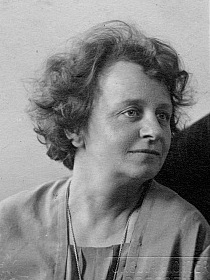
- Born: Etha Irmgard Christine Richter; 4 February 1883; Dresden, Imperial Germany
- Died: 12 March 1977 (aged 94); Dresden, German Democratic Republic
- Resting place: Urnenhain Friedhof Tolkewitz, Dresden; 51.03624°N 13.81968°E

Etha Irmgard Christine Richter (4 February 1883 - 12 March 1977) was a German sculptor and illustrator. Richter is remembered most for her animal sculptures and for her role in the art community of Dresden.

== Early life ==
Etha Irmgard Christine Richter was born in Dresden, first of five daughters born to pianist Hermann Julius Richter (1850–1936) and Johanne Louise Hopf (1862–1939), and sister to photographer Irma Ursula Johanna (1886–1946), Hildegard Daniela Emilie, Ilse Irene Sidonie (1889–1958), and Eleonore Hermine Senta (1890–1986).

== Career ==
As a woman, Richter was unable to enroll at the Dresden Academy of Fine Arts, and instead enrolled at the Tierärztliche Hochschule Dresden. Her early artistic endeavors were self-directed until, encouraged by her husband, veterinarian Dr. Hans Richter (1880–1946), she began studying under Georg Treu and later Robert Diez.

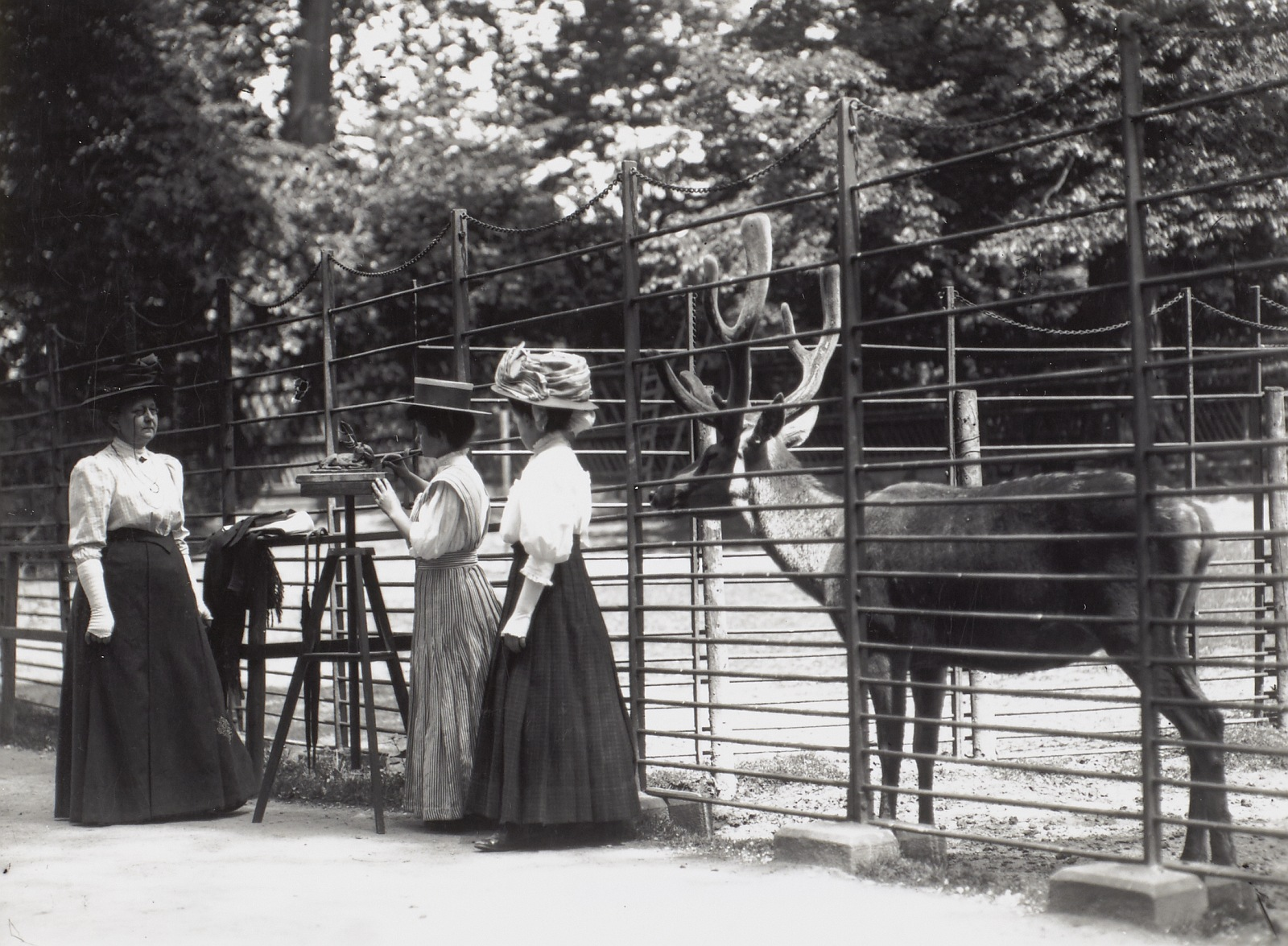
Etha Richter at the Dresden Zoo, 1909, by Ursula Richter

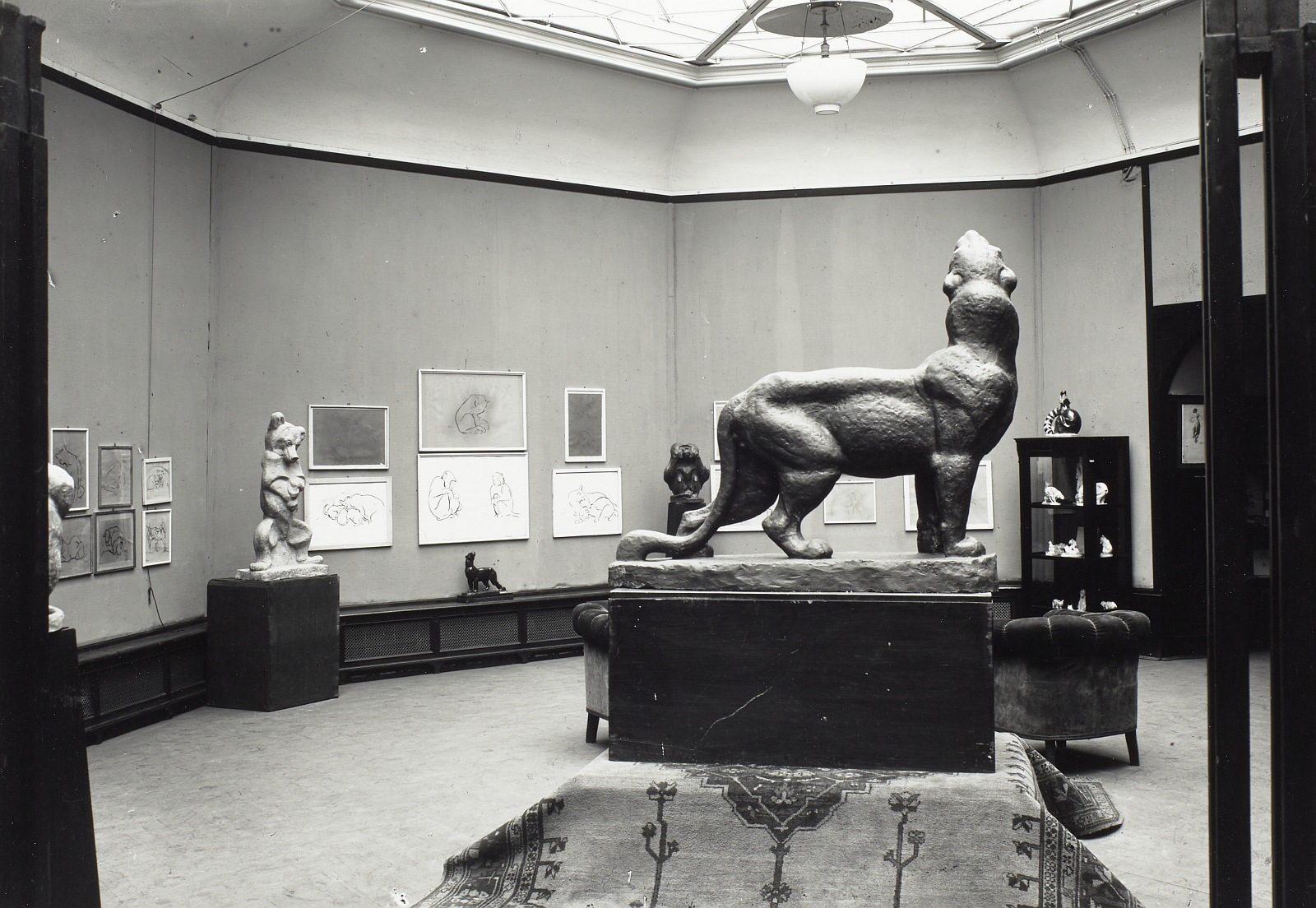
"Etha Richter-Plastik und Zeichnung" installation at Kunstsalon Emil Richter, (sometime before 1930), by Ursula Richter

From 1927 until 1933, Richter and her husband lived in Dorpat (modern day Tartu, Estonia), where he worked as a professor. From 1934 to 1941, Richter and her husband, a veterinarian, were guest professors at the Veterinary College of the University of Ankara, with Richter teaching animal drawing.

Her work was exhibited at the Große Deutsche Kunstausstellung in 1941 and 1942. Richter's atelier, along with over 500 pieces of her work, was destroyed in the bombing of Dresden during the Second World War.

From 1945 to 1963, Richter worked as a private tutor and drawing instructor at the Volkshochschule Dresden.

In 1968, she was awarded the Verband Bildender Künstler der DDR.

== Work (Selection) ==
- Study of an Elephant (Bronze, 1910, Slovak National Gallery)
- Große Figur zweier Panther [Large figure of two panthers] (Bronze, ca. 1922, Museum Kurhouse Kleve)
- Von der Arbeit, (1906, Kunstsammlungen Chemnitz)
