= Ursula Richter (photographer) =

German photographer

Irma Ursula Johanna Richter (1886–1946) was a German photographer who specialized in dance and theatre photography in Dresden.

== Biography ==
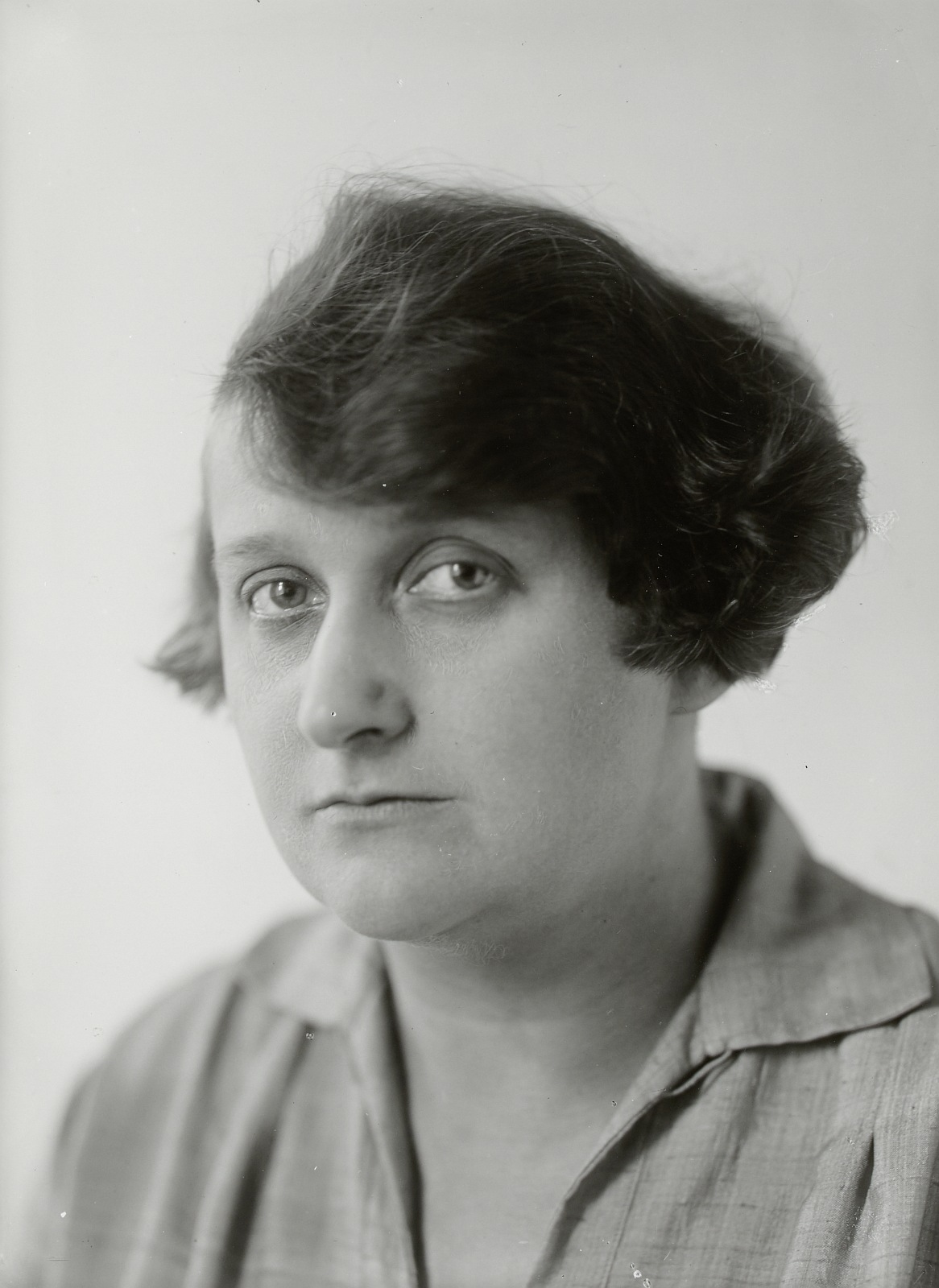
Irma Ursula Johanna Richter

Born in Radebeul, a suburb of Dresden, Richter came from an artistic family. Her father was a pianist and her sister a sculptor. She was however a self-taught photographer, practicing in Dresden from 1913 to 1935. In 1914, she opened her own studio in Dresden. She was especially interested in the theatre, taking portraits of actors and opera singers. Above all, she photographed dance scenes including those of the expressionist dancer Mary Wigman. One of her portraits of Wigman was displayed at the 1926 Frankfurt am Main photography exhibition.

She also took historic portraits of Bruno Decarli and Erich Ponto while in costume. Her stage photography documents not only the work of performers but also of the directors and scenographers. In the 1930s, she was active at the Albert-Theater where she took many images of the performances. She has left some 225 photographs of theatrical and dance performances in Dresden as well as 350 private plates and a large collection of other negatives and prints.

== Bibliography ==
- Lahs-Gonzales, Olivia; Lippard, Lucy R; St. Louis Art Museum (1997). Defining Eye: Women Photographers of the 20th Century: Selections from the Helen Kornblum Collection. St. Louis: Saint Louis Art Museum. ISBN 9780891780472.
- Oddy, J. (2007). "Back in the GDR: Photography in East Germany." Aperture, (189), 42-49.
