= Hans Ulrich Steger =

Swiss caricaturist (1923–2016)

H. U. Steger
- Born: Hans Ulrich Steger; 21 March 1923; Zürich, Switzerland
- Died: 18 June 2016 (aged 93); Maschwanden, Canton Zürich, Switzerland
- Education: ZHdK
- Occupations: caricaturist children's book author
- Spouse: Margrit Teuscher
- Parent(s): Adolf P. Steger; Erna Elisabeth Kosak

Hans Ulrich Steger (generally known as H. U. Steger: 21 March 1923 - 18 June 2016) was a Swiss caricaturist, children's author and artist.

== Life ==
=== Provenance and early years ===
H. U. Steger was born in Zürich and grew up in nearby Küsnacht. Adolf P. Steger, his father, was an architect. He trained between 1939 and 1943 at the Zurich University of the Arts ("Zürcher Hochschule der Künste"), focusing on graphic art.

The Swiss economy was badly affected by the bitterly destructive war being fought out in the surrounding countries: Steger's attempts to find work designing type faces or posters, or in other branches of commercial graphic art, were unsuccessful. At nights he reverted to his schoolboy habit of sketching portraits of the international political heroes and villains of the day, such as Mussolini, Stalin and Haile Selassie. Thinking this could become a source of income, he sent an illustration to the anti-fascist journalist-editor and caricaturist Carl Böckli. Later in 1943 his first published cartoons appeared in the satirical Zürich weekly magazine (since 1996 monthly), Nebelspalter. 1943 was also the year in which he entered cadet school, which was followed by (mandatory) military service.

=== Career ===
Between 1945 and 1961 Steger worked for the mass-market weekly political magazine, Weltwoche. Many of his cartoons were used for the front cover. He married Margrit Teuscher in 1959. He taught from 1960 till 1981 at the "Zürcher Hochschule der Künste", initially on fashion, and later on teaching skills. Between 1963 and 1968 he was also teaching at the Lucerne [Arts] Academy ("Hochschule Luzern").

From 1961 till 1967 he worked as caricaturist with Zürcher Woche, a politically authoritative Sunday newspaper for the German-speaking cantons. Then, between 1967 and 1997, he worked for the mass-market Tages-Anzeiger (TA). Initially his TA contributions were restricted to international politics, but he later broadened his scope to take in domestic issues as well. Between 1972 and 1987 he was also again contributing regularly to Nebelspalter.

As a caricaturist Steger is widely seen as the master of the blunt direct statement, but his work was not restricted to drawing caricatures. He also undertook work as a painter, a graphic artist, a toy designer, a children's book author and an exhibition organiser. He was, in addition, something of an amateur folklorist.

Steger began handing over his "literary legacy" to the archive for contemporary history ("Archiv für Zeitgeschichte") at the National Institute of Technology ("Eidgenössische Technische Hochschule Zürich" / ETH) in 2002. Fourteen years, and several substantial deliveries later, the archivists at the ETH were looking after a substantial collection of his illustrations. Steger often used press photographs of politicians as templates for his caricatures, and these have been integrated in the archived collection.

Hans Ulrich Steger-Teuscher died on 20 June 2016 at Maschwanden, in the hills between Zürich and Luzern. By this time he had become not merely a grandfather, but a great grandfather. His funeral announcement included the request from his family that those minded to send flowers should instead send money to Médecins Sans Frontières.

== Caricatures ==
Steger's caricatures often take inspiration from literature (in particular from fairy tales and nursery rhymes) and art (well-known paintings, sculptures and films). He has donated approximately 1,800 original caricatures to the archive for contemporary history ("Archiv für Zeitgeschichte") at the National Institute of Technology ("Eidgenössische Technische Hochschule Zürich" / ETH). These date from the period between the end of the Second World War and the end of the twentieth century. They principally concern international and Swiss politics.

== Children's books ==
Steger's two most successful children's books were "Reise nach Tripiti" ("Journey to Tripiti" 1967) and "Wenn Kubaki kommt" ("If Kubaki comes" 1976). They highlight his passion for small details and foreign travel. "Reise nach Tripiti" has been translated into various languages including English, Afrikaans, Danish, Swedish, Dutch and Japanese.
