= Empfertshausen =

- Municipality
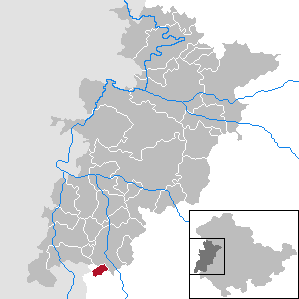
- Location of Empfertshausen within Wartburgkreis district
- Interactive map of Empfertshausen
- Location within Germany Location within Thuringia
- Coordinates: 50°40′N 10°6′E
- Country: Germany
- State: Thuringia
- District: Wartburgkreis

Government
  - Mayor (2021–27): Antonio Häfner

Area
  - Total: 4.87 km^{2} (1.88 sq mi)
- Elevation: 460 m (1,510 ft)

Population (2025-12-31)
  - Total: 507
  - Density: 104/km^{2} (270/sq mi)
- Time zone: UTC+01:00 (CET)
  - Summer (DST): UTC+02:00 (CEST)
- Postal codes: 36452
- Dialling codes: 036964
- Vehicle registration: WAK

Empfertshausen is a municipality in the Wartburgkreis district of Thuringia, Germany.
