= Walter Arnold (German sculptor) =

German sculptor and politician

- Arnold in 1955
- Born: 29 August 1909; Leipzig, Germany
- Died: 11 July 1979 (aged 69); Dresden, German Democratic Republic (East Germany)
- Occupation: Sculptor
- Political party: SED

Walter Arnold (27 August 1909 – 11 July 1979) was a German stonemason and sculptor. Between 1957 and 1964 he was the president of the Association of Visual Artists (DDRA / Verband Bildender Künstler) in East Germany.

== Life ==
=== Early years ===
Walter Arnold was the son of a Leipzig Stonemason. He trained between 1924 and 1928 in wood carving and stone sculpture. Between 1928 and 1932 he studied the shapes of sculptures and ceramics under Alfred Thiele at the School of Craftsmanship at Leipzig. After finishing his studies he worked as an assistant to Thiele until 1933, after which he worked as a freelance artist, supporting himself with contract work, including grave stone business and stonework renovation jobs. He was a soldier during the war, ending up in a prison camp just outside Bad Kreuznach. Returning home to Leipzig, in November 1946 he joined what was shortly to become ruling SED (party) of what was in the process of becoming the German Democratic Republic (East Germany).

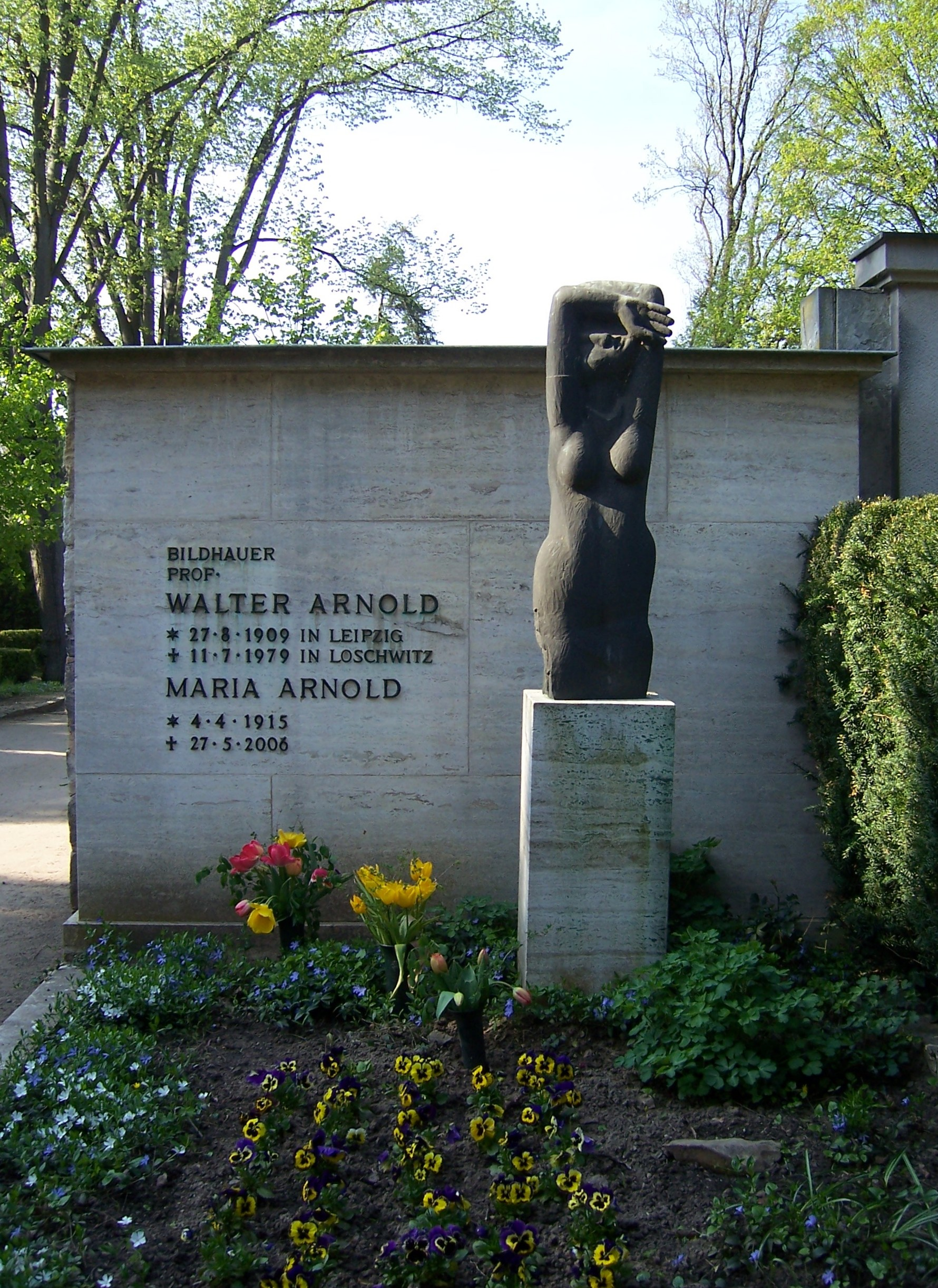
The statue on the grave of Walter and Maria Arnold (entitled "Es gibt kein fremdes Leid") was created by Walter Arnold himself.

=== Academic progress ===
1946 was also the year in which Walter Arnold started to teach at the Academy of Visual Arts in Leipzig. In 1949 he accepted an invitation to move to the Dresden Academy of Fine Arts where he worked as a professor until 1970. His students included Reinhard Dietrich. He then returned to the Academy in Leipzig where he was designated an emeritus professor in 1974, but continued to give master classes.

=== Political progress ===
Arnold became a member of the East German Academy of Culture in 1952. From 1952 to 1962 he was a Candidate for the Central Committee of The Party, being a member of it from 1958 till 1961.

In 1958 he succeeded Otto Nagel as the president of the country's Association of Visual Artists (DDRA / Verband Bildender Künstler). Arnold retained this position till 1964.

=== Last things ===
Walter Arnold died in 1979 in Dresden, where he is buried, now with his wife Maria, in the Loschwitz Cemetery, under an image created by himself.

== Some works ==
=== in bronze ===
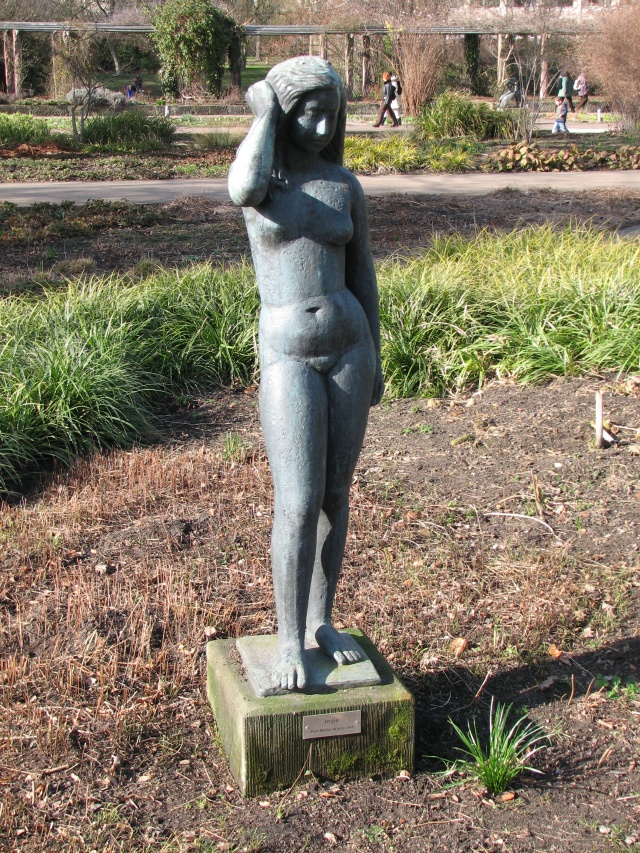
Inge (1949)

- Wäscherin, 1947
- Bauarbeiter, 1947
- Tanzpause, 1947
- An early Memorial to the victims of Fascism at the Southern Cemetery, Leipzig, 1949
- Jugend – Baumeister der DDR, 1951: Ausgangspunkt für den ersten Nationalpreis der DDR an einen Künstler
- Traktoristin (woman driving a tractor), 1953
- Befreite Arbeit – schöneres Leben (Liberating work – beautiful life), 1961
- Ernst-Thälmann-Denkmal in Stralsund, 1962
- Bäuerin – (Farmer's wife) Year unknown, exhibited in front of the Agricultural Museum at Wandlitz from 1975 till 2008: now in storage
- Clara Zetkin Memorial in Leipzig, 1967 in the Leipzig Johanna Park (formerly the Clara Zetkin Park)

=== wood carvings ===
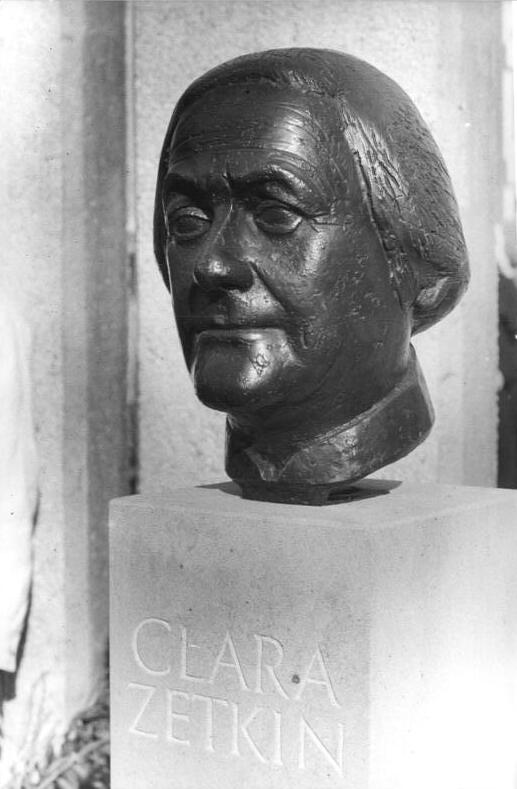
Clara Zetkin (1857–1933) memorial bust

- Das Grauen 1934
- Das Leid 1946: aus einer gespaltenen Bohle gearbeitet, erinnert an seine Kriegsgefangenschaft
- Vietnam klagt an (Viet Nam complains), 1966
- Vorwärts und nicht vergessen – die Solidarität (Onwards and don't forget – Solidarity), 1967
- Venceremos (We shall overcome), 1974
- Anette
- Es gibt kein fremdes Leid

=== portrait-busts and statuettes ===
- Felix Mendelssohn Bartholdy, 1947 in the Leipzig neighbourhood Musikviertel
- Carl Maria von Weber, 1952
- Ernst Thälmann, 1956[4]
- Karl Liebknecht and Rosa Luxemburg, 1957
- Otto Buchwitz, 1962

=== in memoriam ===
- Inge, 1949
- Badende, 1961
- Aphrodite, 1971
