= Hans Steger (sculptor) =

German sculptor

- Born: 12 June 1907; Zeulenroda, Germany
- Died: 9 January 1968 (aged 60); Dresden, East Germany
- Known for: Sculpting
- Style: Modified realism
- Military career
- Service years: June 1940 – June 1945

Hans Steger (12 June 1907 – 9 January 1968) was a German sculptor.

== Life ==
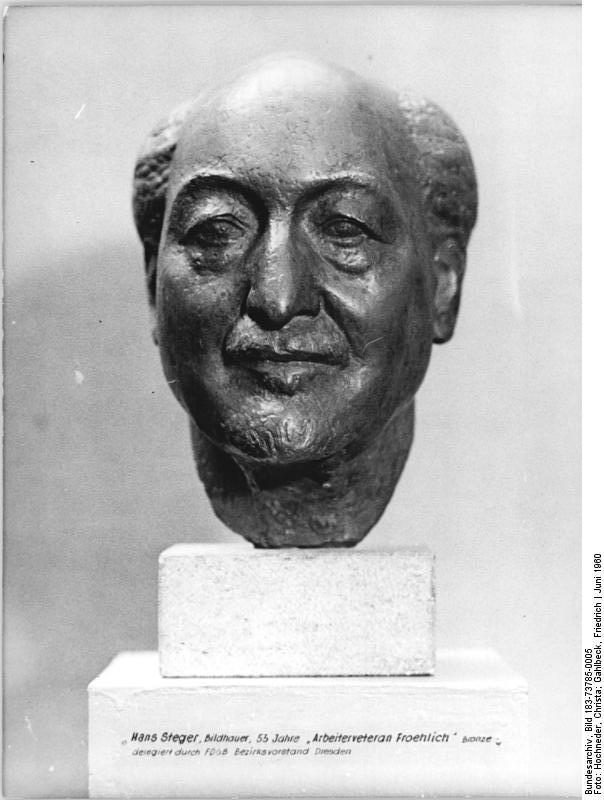
Labour movement veteran August Fröhlich ("Arbeiterveteran August Fröhlich") Hans Steger, 1960 This is the work for which Steger won the Trade Union Federation Arts Prize.

Johannes Steger was born in Zeulenroda, a small town in the Thuringian countryside to the south of Leipzig in central southern Germany. His father was a clock maker and the deacon of a free-church community. The boy grew up in a strict religiously oriented family.

Between 1921 and 1926 Steger was apprenticed as a carver of wooden figures and then, on successful completion of the apprenticeship, was employed at this craft. Between November 1927 and the summer of 1928 he attended the Dresden Academy of Fine Arts where he studied under Georg Wrba, a leading sculptor and graphic artist of the time. Then, between October 1929 and 1932, he attended the Combined National Academy for Pure and Applied Arts ("Vereinigte Staatsschulen für freie und angewandte Kunst") in Berlin. Here he was taught by Wilhelm Gerstel. Between 1932 and 1937 he worked as a freelance sculptor. From 1934 he had his own studio in Weimar where, between 1937 and 1939, he attended classes with Emil Hipp at the Arts Academy. War broke out in 1939: between June 1940 and June 1945 Steger undertook his military service.

Between 1945 and 1954 he again worked as a freelance sculptor in his home region which, since May 1945, had been administered as the Soviet occupation zone and then, in October 1949, was relaunched as the Soviet sponsored German Democratic Republic (East Germany). In 1954 he was appointed to a professorship at the Dresden Academy of Fine Arts. In 1960 he won a Trade Union Federation Arts Prize.

Hans Steger died at Dresden on 9 January 1968.

== Works ==
The focus of Steger's work was on portrait sculptures. In that respect he considered himself closely connected with the Realism tradition that had been a feature of German sculpture during the first half of the twentieth century. Important influences were Wilhelm Gerstel, Hermann Blumenthal, Fritz Cremer, Waldemar Grzimek and Wilhelm Lehmbruck. However, he developed his own style which went beyond being merely derivative.

== Personal ==
Hans Steger was married with four daughters and one son.
