= Peter August Böckstiegel =

German painter (1889–1951)

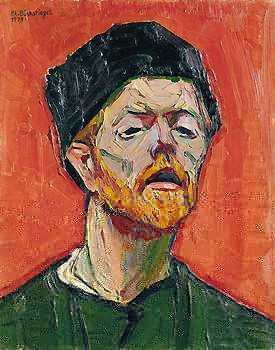
Self-portrait (1913)

Peter August Böckstiegel (7 April 1889 – 22 March 1951) was a German painter, graphic artist and sculptor, in the Expressionistic style.

== Life and work ==
He was the fifth of six children born in Werther to a family of small farmers and linen weavers. After displaying artistic talent, he was apprenticed to a painter and glazier in Bielefeld. After passing the Journeyman examination as a painter, in 1907, he attended the new arts and crafts school. He was first exposed to the latest French paintings trends during a 1909 visit to the Folkwang Museum in Essen. His earliest known professional works date from the following year.

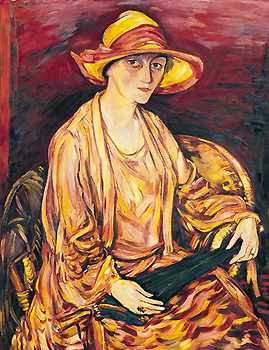
Portrait of his wife, Hanna

In 1913, with the help of a scholarship, he was able to attend the Dresden Academy of Fine Arts, where he studied with Oskar Zwintscher and Otto Gussmann. He also became lifelong friends with his fellow student, Conrad Felixmüller, whose sister, Hanna, would later become his wife.

At the beginning of 1915, he was called up for military duty and served in the Landsturm, although he was still able to do some artwork during idle moments. After 1916, he was on the Eastern Front, in Romania, Ukraine and Russia. He would remain in Ukraine until March 1919, when an English warship brought him and his unit back from Nikolayev.

Shortly after returning, he married Hanna. Later that year, he was one of the co-founders of the Dresden Secession, together with Felixmüller, Otto Dix, Otto Lange, Lasar Segall and Hugo Zehder, among others. Oskar Kokoschka would also become associated with the group, but not a full member. In 1920, the Dresden Academy awarded him their Torniamenti Travel Grant. In 1929, he began producing his first sculptures.

After the Nazi takeover in 1933, his paintings were declared to be "degenerate", and taken off display. From 1937 to 1938, over one hundred of his works were confiscated. Many were sold overseas, to obtain foreign currency. The rest were burned. During the bombing of Dresden his studio, containing hundreds of his works, was destroyed. He barely escaped death, attempting to save as much as he could. Later, he took Hanna and his young son to his family home in Werther, which had survived intact. There, he established a new studio and became Chairman of the Westphalian Secession. In 1949, he was presented with an "honorary studio" at the Dresden Academy, and was able to recover some small items from the ruins of his former home.

He died in Werther in 1951, and was interred at the local cemetery. His home and its artworks have been preserved as he left them. In 2008, his family established a foundation to promote his work and create a catalog raisonné. They also established a prize, now worth 6,000 Euros, to be presented to promising young artists from the Ostwestfalen-Lippe region. In 2014, the Gütersloh District approved funds for the construction of a small museum, which was opened in 2017. Streets have been named after him in Bielefeld and Dresden.

== Selected works ==
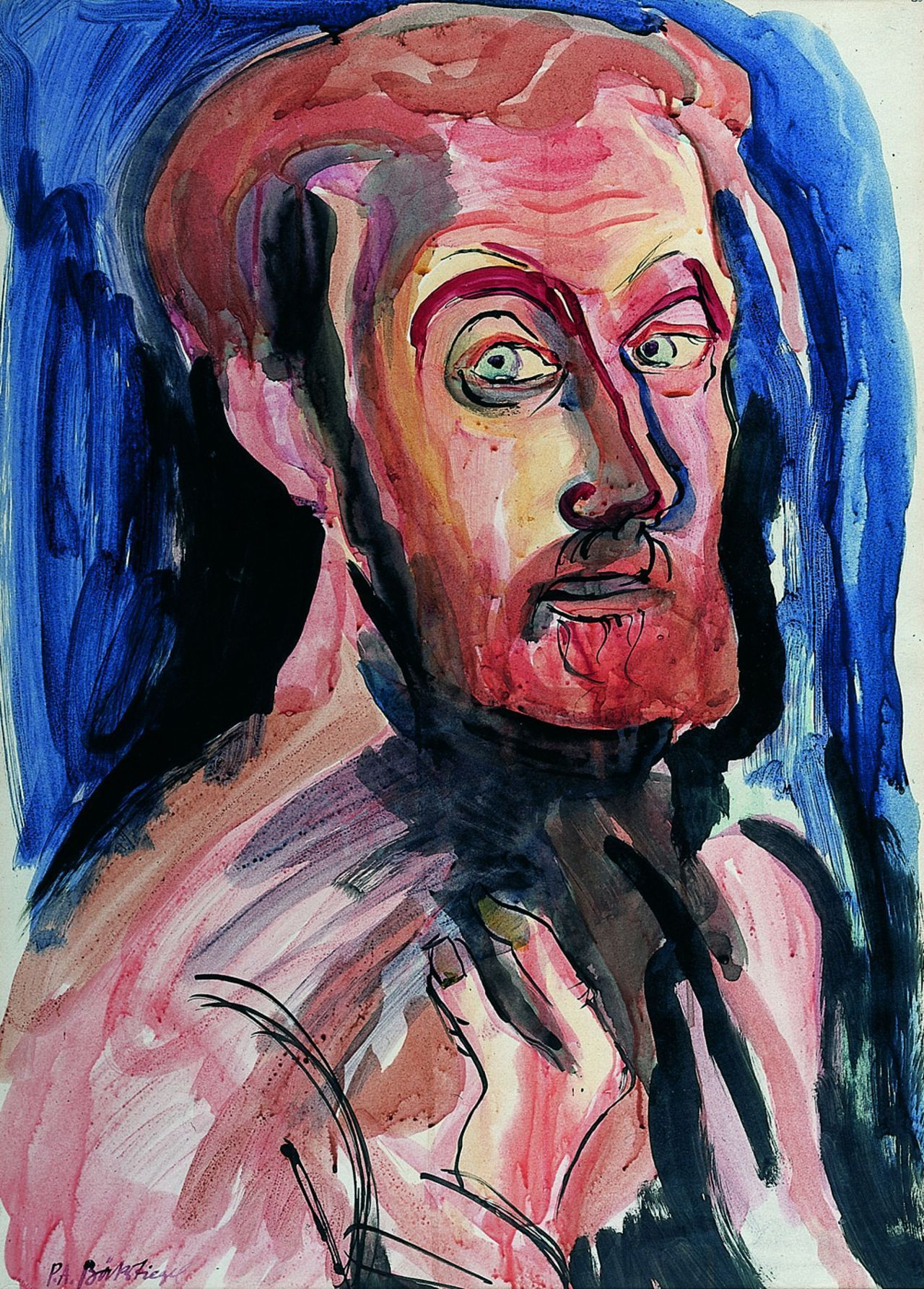
Self-portrait (1924)

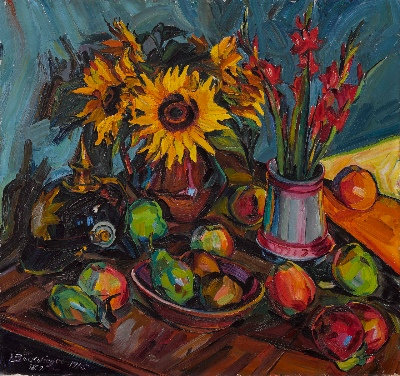
Floral Still-life with Pickelhaube

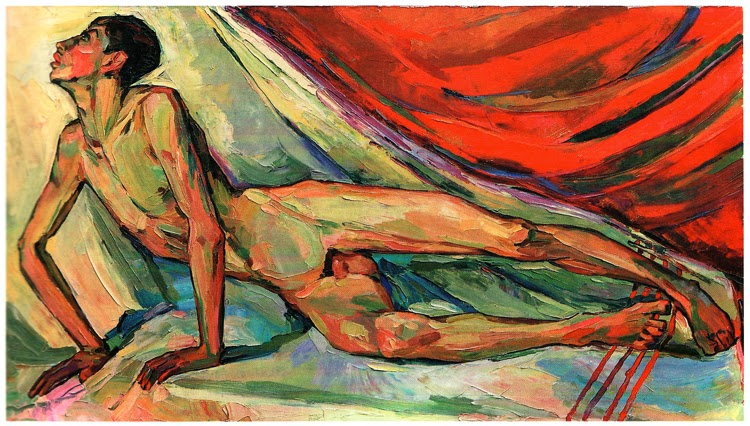
The Departure of Youngsters for the War

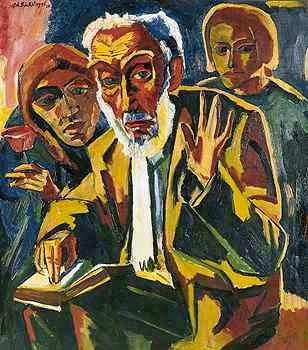
The Word

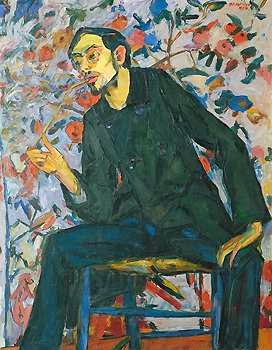
Portrait of Conrad Felixmüller

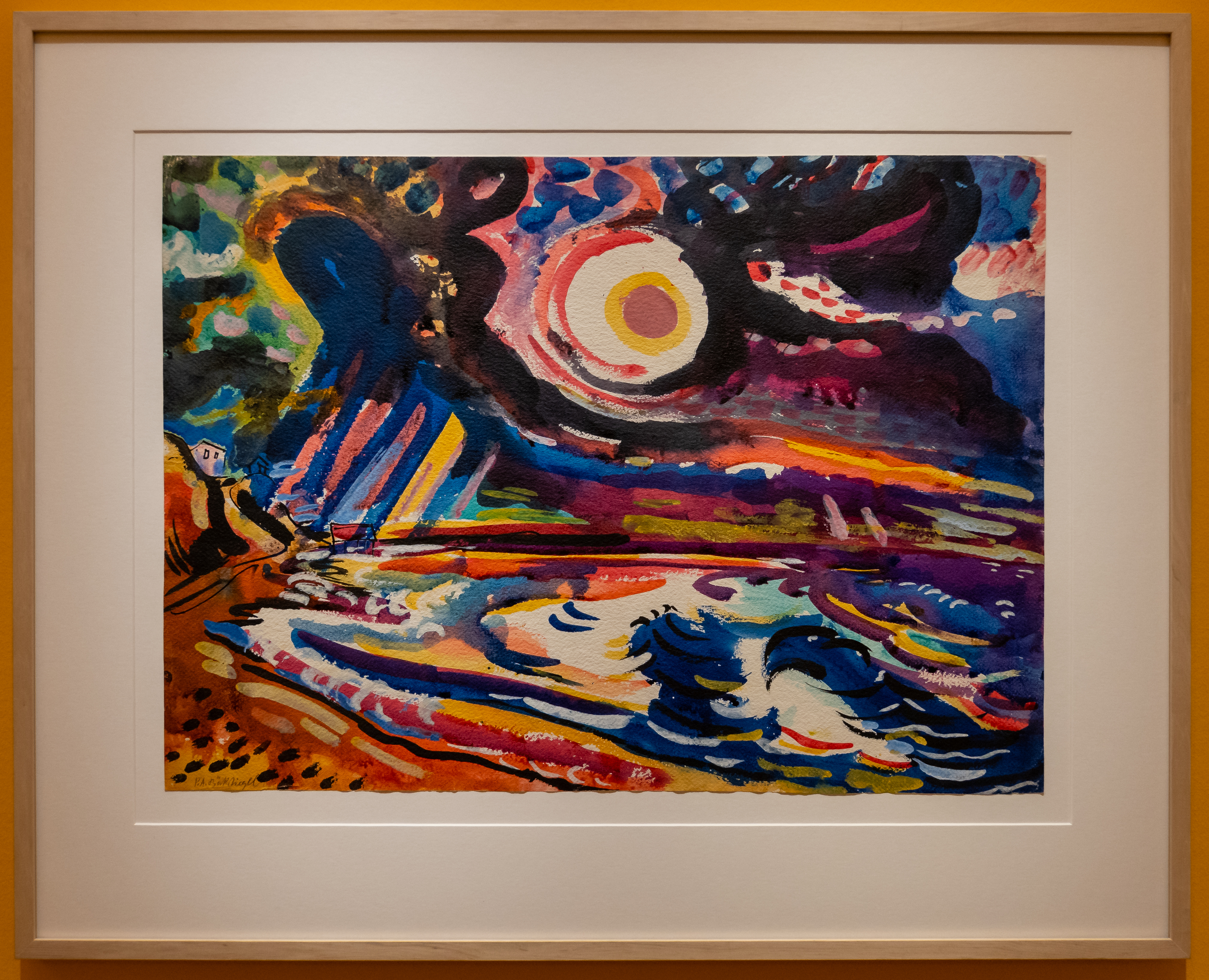
Ocean Sun (1919)

== Sources ==
- David Riedel: Peter August Böckstiegel – Junge Kunst 34, Klinkhardt & Biermann Verlag, Munich 2019, ISBN 978-3-943616-73-6
- Klaus Kösters (Ed.): Peter August Böckstiegel, die Bauern und die Kunst, Aschendorff, Münster 2009 ISBN 978-3-402-12767-4
- Nikolaus Nadrag, David Riedel (Eds.): Peter August Böckstiegel. Der Expressionismus sucht die Seele. Werke von 1911 bis 1951, Hans Kock Buch- und Offsetdruck GmbH 2016 ISBN 978-3-00-054703-4
- Ernst-Gerhard Güse (Ed.): Das Peter-August-Böckstiegel-Haus in Arrode, Druckverlag Kettler, Gütersloh 2010 ISBN 978-3-86206-064-1
