= Christoph Voll =

German sculptor and artist

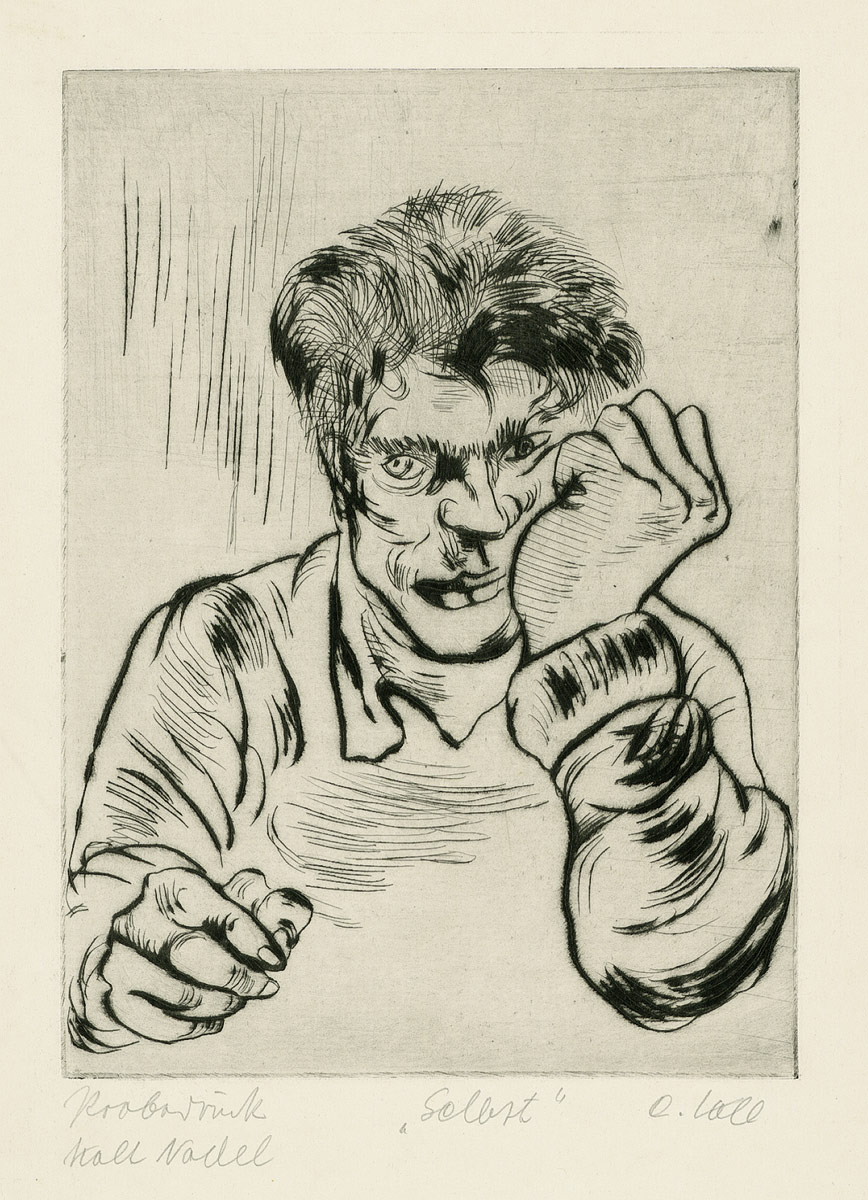

Christoph Voll (27 April 1897 in Munich – 16 June 1939 in Karlsruhe) was a German sculptor and graphic artist associated with Expressionism. He was a member of the politically active avant-garde group of Dresden artists known as the Dresdner Sezession.

== Beginnings ==
Christoph Voll was born in Munich in April 1897, as the son of sculptor Roman Voll and painter Augusta Felicitas. His father died shortly after his son's birth, and his mother decided to leave him and his sisters for extended periods in orphanages run by nuns.

A childhood characterised by the stern and cold authority of the sisters, and a distant mother figure, impacted Voll profoundly. This is evident in his early works in particular, which see the nun and orphan as recurring themes. His childhood also seems to have prompted a degree of social indignation. Voll felt closely affiliated with ‘ordinary’ people, and often made them models for his work.

According to Voll himself, he already began expressing himself artistically in the orphanages, where he would make drawings and even small sculptures of dried bread. In 1911, Voll's mother moved from Munich to Dresden after having remarried. Here, Voll gained apprenticeship with the sculptor Albert Starke, from whom he learned the basic techniques of sculpting.

In 1915, he joined the army and spent four years fighting in WW1 (including at the French and Russian fronts). He was awarded the Iron Cross (2nd degree) and subsequently produced a few works with war themes (e.g. Soldat mit verwundetem Kameraden from 1927 to 1928). Voll never spoke publicly about his war experiences, but remained an ardent pacifist for the rest of his life.

== Career ==
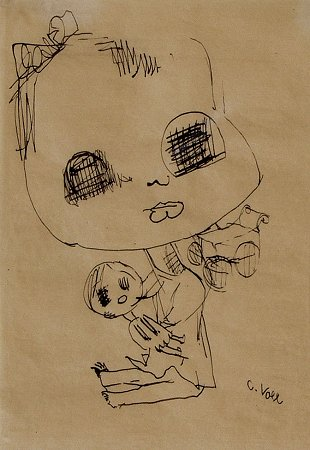
Kind mit Puppe, 1921, Ink drawing, 23 x 15 cm

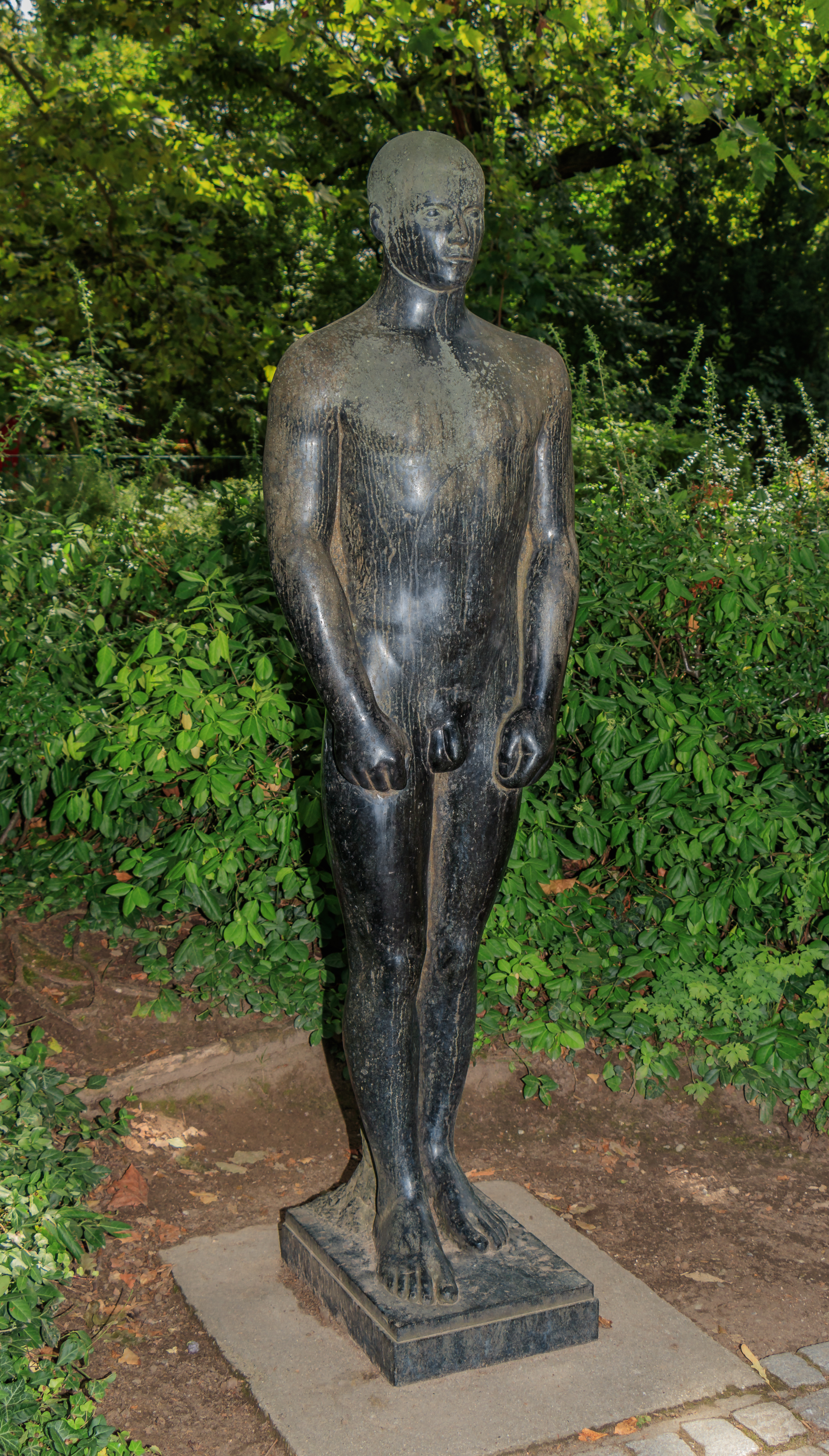
"Jüngling" (Youngling), Stadtgarten Karlsruhe, Germany

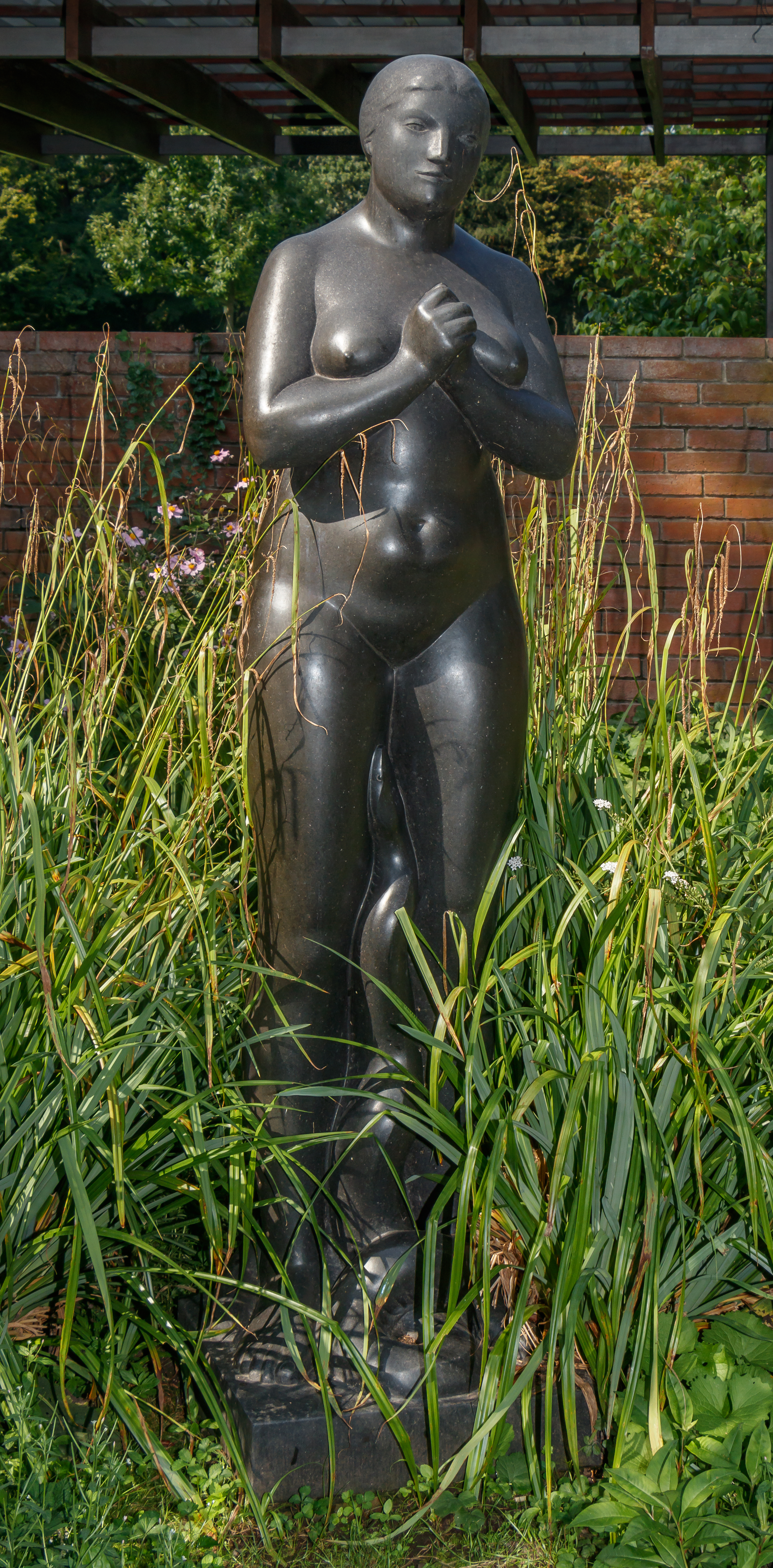
"Eva", Stadtgarten Karlsruhe, Germany

After the war, Voll returned to Dresden, where he enrolled at the Kunstgewerbeschule and gradually entered Dresden's dynamic artistic milieu.

In 1920, he joined the Dresdner Sezessionsgruppe 1919, a creative society of intellectuals and artists intent on recasting world orders according to a utopian form of socialism. The group included prominent contemporary artists such as Otto Dix, Conrad Felixmüller, Hugo Zehder (architect), Lasar Segall, Otto Schubert and Gela Forster.

It was in the context of this group's exhibitions that Voll sold his first major works, and received important working grants. Oskar Kokoschka was an honorary member of the group, but never actually exhibited with them.

Among Kokoschka's students was a young Danish painter, Erna Sørensen, and to his dismay, she and Voll fell in love and got married in May 1922. This initiated a period of artistic productivity and emotional calm in Voll's life; a combination that he very much attributed to the positive influence of his wife.

Voll's participation in countless exhibitions (including those of Gruppe 1919) led to greater recognition as a major German artist, and in 1924 he won the professorial chair in plastic arts at the newly founded Schule für Kunst und Handwerk in Saarbrücken (at the recommendation of Sterl from the Dresdner Kunstakademie).

This was an important period in his career and personal life. Saarland belonged to the poorest districts in Germany, and was predominantly inhabited by a working class population. After the end of WW1, the region came under French mandate as part of the Versailles accords. This status fostered a number of intense political ideologies, including a segregationist group intent on disassociating Saarland from both France and Germany. For a period, Voll appears to have sympathized with this notion (according to later testimonies from some of his students), though he never expressed this unequivocally.

Artistically, Voll may have perceived Saarbrücken as a station in his career, but certainly not as the culmination. He continued to work in wood – especially oak – and was a dedicated teacher and instructor. Little is known about his personal life in this period, although his inclination to portray people in his life persisted.

Consequently, we know that his social circle included the painter Oskar Trepte, who he knew from his years in Dresden, and the art critic Arthur Binz, whom he sculpted in 1925–26 (sold from the Hoh Collection to Germanisches Nationalmuseum in 2008). Also included in his social circle was the African-American painter William Johnson (artist), whom he and his wife Erna Krake met in Cagnes-sur Mer in 1928–29.

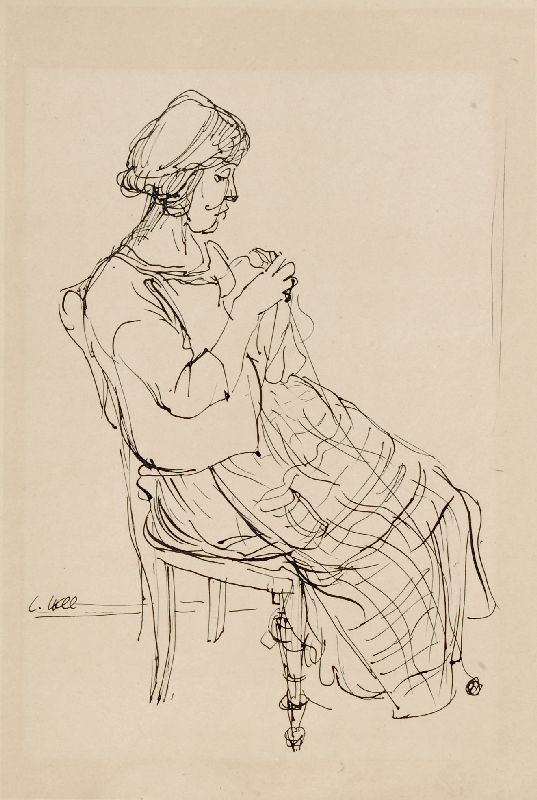
Portrait of Erna (artist's wife), Ink drawing. 42 x 33,5 cm.

During his time in Saarbrücken, Voll attained increasing recognition as an artist. In 1926, he participated in the International Art Fair of Dresden with three wooden sculptures, and this resonated with both the public and the artistic elite to such an extent that other major exhibitions followed; the most important of which was a solo exhibit at Galerie Neumann & Nierendorf in Berlin in 1927.

As part of this wave of success, Voll was appointed Professor of Sculpture at the Badischen Kunsthochschule in Karlsruhe in 1928. Here, Voll intensified his professional life, dedicating himself fully to his work and his best students. This came at the expense of the students he deemed unworthy. His demanding approach to apprenticeship caused dismay and bruised egos among those that in his opinion were not dedicated or talented enough, and some of them would harbor enough resentment to later become key figures to feeding the national-socialist denunciation of Voll.

In Karlsruhe, Voll engaged with his colleagues (Hubbuch, Schnarrenberger, and Scholz) to formulate and execute a new style, and the academy became a major center of Realism in Europe. It was not to last. By the late 1920s, Baden was marked by violent national-socialist tendencies.

When the Nazis came to power in 1933, many of Voll's colleagues were forcefully entpflichtet from duty. While Voll was declared ‘Kulturbolschewist’, was interrogated, and was the subject of major ideological critiques, he escaped the initial wave of persecution, and was allowed to retain his position and continue his work.

In this period, he turned away from some of his traditional leitmotifs, and began dedicating himself to portraying the female body, and in particular the complexity of its movement. Among his masterpieces from this period are major works in stone such as Eva/Erwachen (1928–33) and Sitzender Akt mit Zopf (1932).

In 1937, the tides turned against Voll as well. His sculpture ‘Schwangere’ was selected for the exhibition of ‘Entartete Kunst’ in Munich. While the exhibit included many artists and works, Voll's sculpture was selected from more than 17,000 works that the Nazis has confiscated; reflecting the societal impact of his art. The exhibit sought to generate funds by selling so-called degenerate art to foreign collectors and institutions. Among the four agents charged with selling the confiscated art was Hildebrand Gurlitt, whose son, Cornelius Gurlitt, kept at least two of Voll's works in his private collection that was discovered in 2012. Before 1937 had ended, some of Voll's works were also denounced as degenerate in the Nazi publication SA-Mann. Voll's anno terribilis culminated in the de facto dismissal from the academy in Karlsruhe, when his contract was not extended.

While Voll seems to have been painfully aware of the consequences of his beliefs and actions, in the end, both his art and his person were simply too expressive to be tolerated by the Nazi regime. Following his dismissal in 1937, Voll became increasingly affected by the toxic political milieu, and the propaganda launched against him. Over the following two years he tried dedicating himself to his work, but was far from as productive as during his time in Saarbrücken and Karlsruhe. He became ill – most likely of intestinal cancer, though Professor Dietrich Schubert of Heidelberg University has attributed his illness to the "psychological disruptions" he faced.

In June 1939, Voll died at 42 years old. By then, his wife and daughter had sought refuge in Erna's native Denmark, and so his body was taken to Oksby, on the west coast of Denmark, where he was buried.

== The Nachlass Collection ==
At Voll's death in 1939, his art had already been declared ‘entartet’ and unwanted, and several of his major works appear to have been destroyed by the Nazis. It would require a dose of good fortune and the involvement of one of Voll's old acquaintances, Edvard Munch, to save most of his æuvre. Voll had visited Munch unannounced in Norway in 1925, and was at first dismissed at the door. But when he showed Munch photographs of his works, he was invited in and the two artists became friends. Munch subsequently expressed admiration for what he described as Voll's "…primordial force and deep inner calm". During the 1930s, Munch had repeatedly expressed interest in organizing a solo exhibit of Voll's works at the National Gallery in Oslo, but with Voll's diminishing status and the growing regional power of Germany, this became increasingly politicized and difficult.

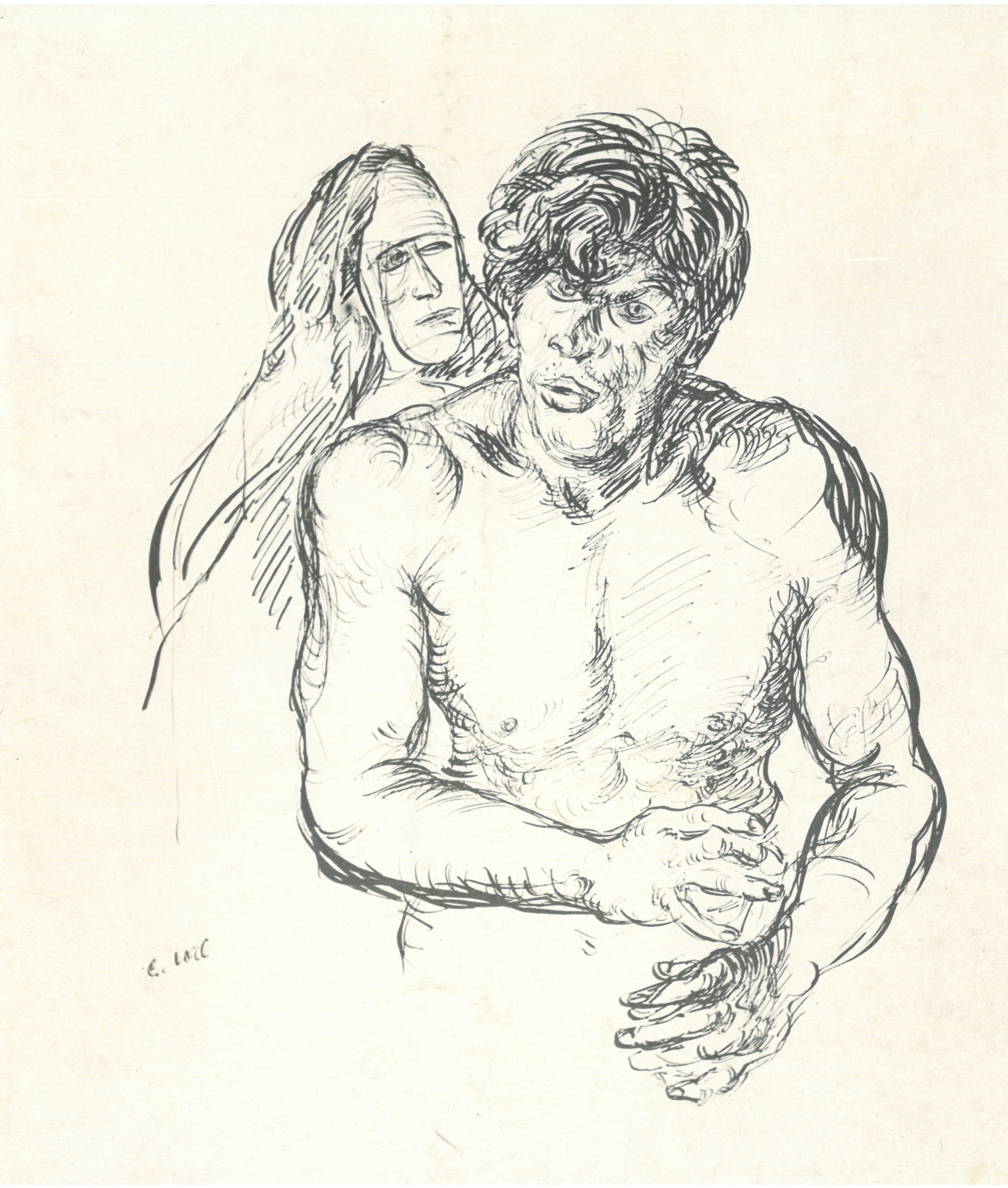
This self portrait returns to the theme of the nun, and was included in the solo-exhibit at Galerie Neumann & Nierendorf (Berlin) in 1927. Ten years later, in 1937, it would be one of the images published in the Nazi journal SA-Mann, denouncing Voll as degenerate ('entartet').

At Voll's death, his status had deteriorated into a formal prohibition against exhibition issued by the Ministerium für Volksaufklärung und Propaganda in Berlin. The political pressures on Oslo lead to the abandonment of the project, but by then a sealed train wagon containing his works had reached Denmark, where it was seized, opened, and the works brought to safety. Northern Europe's cultural elites had through the past years witnessed the destruction of unwanted art and literature in Germany with great apprehension.

Many of Voll's works had suffered similar fates, and it is likely that it was this concrete threat, which caused the Danish authorities to act. For the duration of the war, Voll's æuvre was stored in the cellars of Christiansborg (the Danish Parliament) in Copenhagen, and in 1948 a formal exhibit of the collection was set up in the same place. After the war, Voll's widow tried to retrieve what was left of her husband's work in Germany, but from friends and colleagues she learned that the works remaining in Karlsruhe were so damaged – both through deliberate destruction and because of the war – that nothing of real value remained.

During the 1950s, Erna Voll gradually returned much of the collection to Karlsruhe, due to the better options for professional storage, exhibition and sale. The new director of the Kunsthalle, Dr Kurt Martin, was eager to redeem Voll in Germany's eyes, and several of the large stone sculptures were placed in public spaces such as the Botanical Garden.

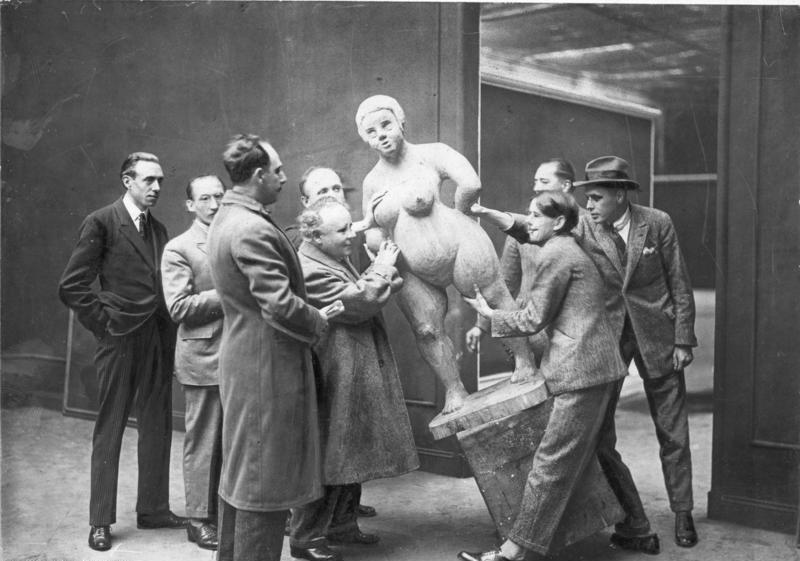
Preparation of exhibit with Voll's works in Berlin

Voll's sensual female figures were nevertheless met with dire reactions from more conservative segments of society; reactions that at times were expressed through vandalism. This reactionary view of the art was nevertheless temporary, and between 1960 and 1964 a federally organized memorial exhibition of Voll toured German museums (Baden-Baden, Bremen, Kaiserslautern, Karlsruhe, Mannheim, Munich, Pforzheim and Saarbrücken). This led to a number of museum purchases from the collection, but not much more.
