= Otto Lange =

German painter

Otto Lange (29 October 1879 in Dresden – 19 December 1944 in Dresden) was a German Expressionist painter and graphic artist.

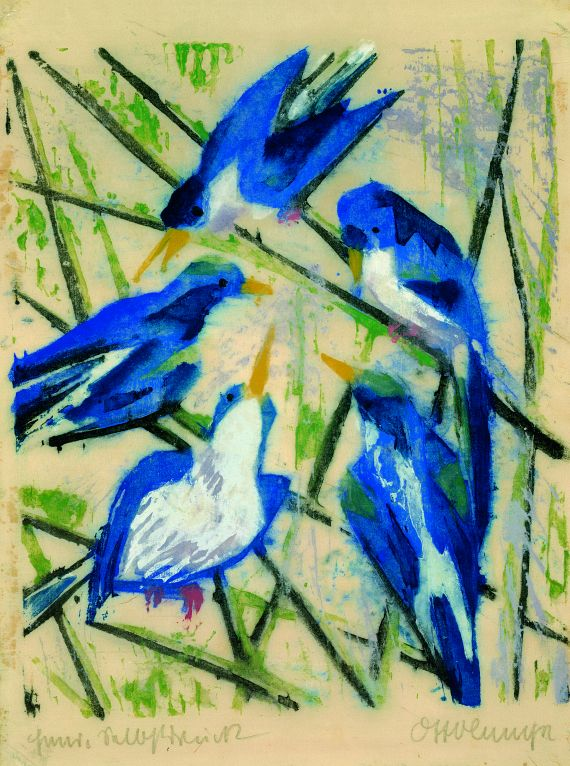
Blue birds, 1916. Colour woodcut

After an apprenticeship as a decorator, he became a pupil of the Kunstgewerbeschule in Dresden and then studied at the Otto Gussmann Academy of art. From 1919 he lived in Dresden, where, alongside Otto Dix, Conrad Felixmueller, Otto Schubert and Lasar Segall, he co-founded the Dresdner Sezession group, a short-lived collaboration of German Expressionism. The works of this new generation of disillusioned artists placed a much greater emphasis on political and social reformation through pacifistic means, rather than adopting the nihilistic social criticism and cynicism of their Die Brücke predecessors. From 1921 he was a member of the Academic Council of Saxony and in 1925 he was appointed professor of the State Art School for Textile Industry, Plauen by Karl Hanusch. In 1926 he painted the Lutheran church in Ellefeld, Vogtland.

Lange was arrested by the National Socialists in 1933, and lost his professorship. He then worked as a freelance artist in Dresden. In 1938, two of his paintings were shown at the Munich Degenerate Art Exhibition.

Lange produced an extensive body of printed graphic work; his subjects ranged from religious representations to still lifes to book illustrations. His woodcuts differed from those of other expressionists, as Lange mainly used an elaborate technique of colour printing. Most of the time he did not print his work with a press or use a brayer, but instead made hand rubbings after he had inked the printing block directly with a brush.

== Gallery ==
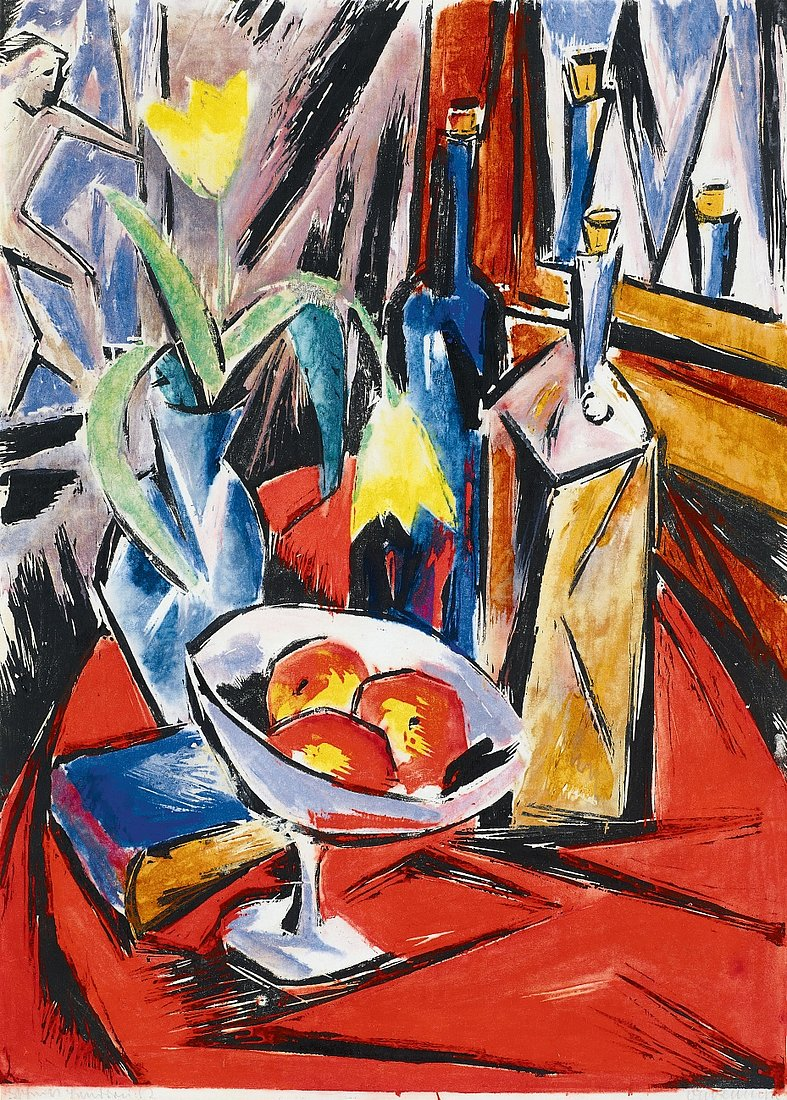
Still life with red ceiling, 1916. Colour woodcut

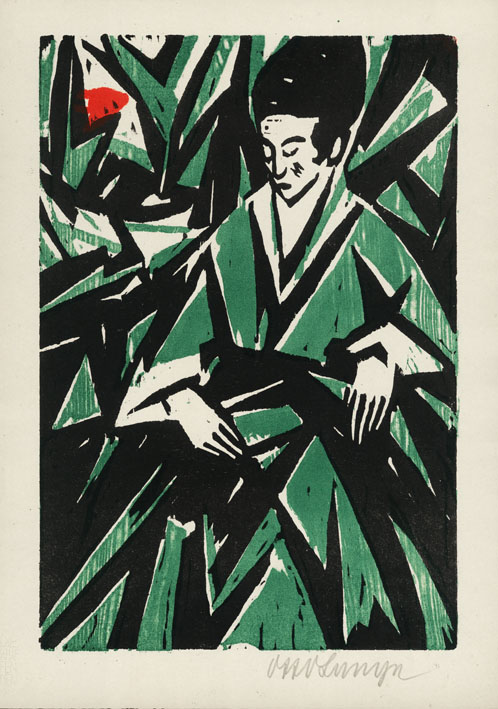
Lady in green, 1918. Colour woodcut

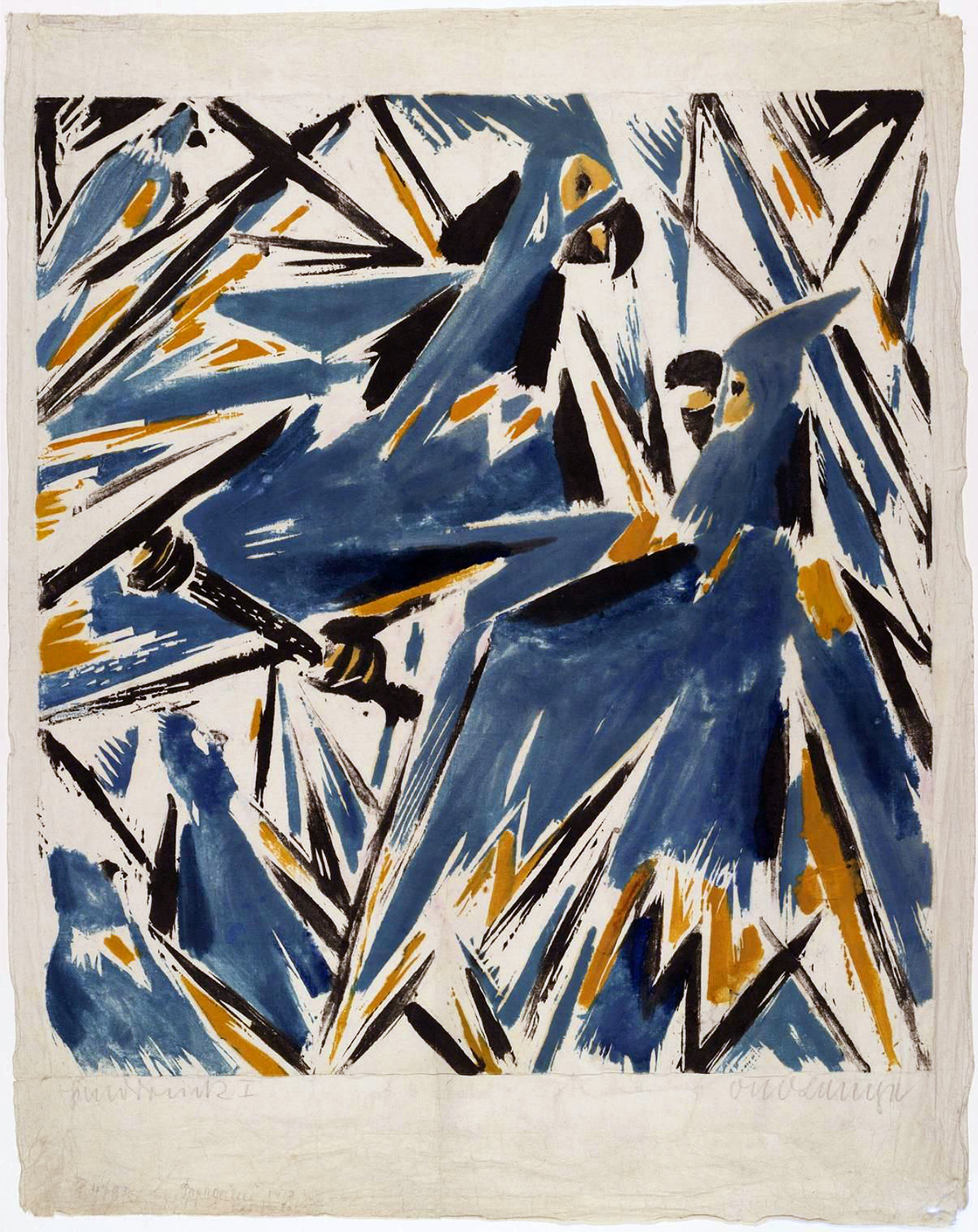
Parrots, 1917

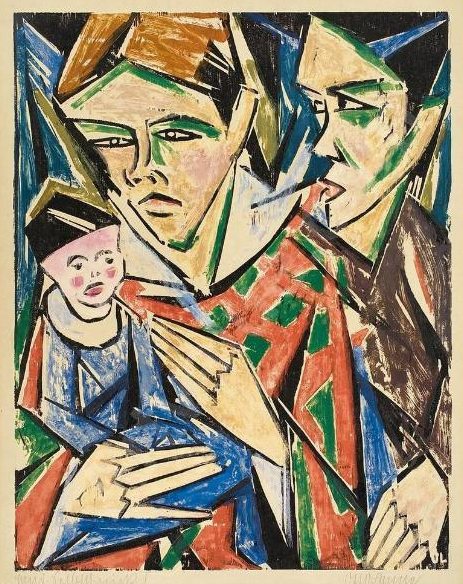
Girl with doll, 1917
