= Catrin G. Grosse =

German painter, graphic designer and sculptor

Catrin G. Grosse (born 1964 in Finsterwalde), also known as Catrin Große, is a German painter, graphic designer and sculptor.

== Career ==
Catrin G. Grosse began at 16 years of age with an evening class in painting and graphic design in Cottbus at Uli Richter, Hans Scheuerecker und Dietrich Brüning, while obtaining her baccalaureate degree (abitur) in parallel. She studied from 1984 to 1989 painting and graphic design at the College of Fine Arts in Dresden and 1991, received a diploma. From 1991 to 1993, she was a master's student of Prof. Günter Horlbeck. 1993-1994 she received the Philip Morris sponsorship of the arts, a residency at the Museum Schloss Moritzburg. 1994-1995 she obtained a DAAD scholarship for postgraduate studies followed at the Royal College of Art, London in the printing department, with Professor Tim Mara, where she developed the anvil print technology. Anvil print is an embossing process, which combines various printing techniques in a single print by rolling or cutting operations of the pressure. Printing is done with oil paint on very heavy cotton-based handmade paper on a low-pressure roll press with very soft felt or rubber foam.

Since 1995, Grosse has worked as a freelance artist, graphic artist and sculptor.

Since then she held numerous lectures and workshops (e.g. at the University of Art & Design in Coventry, Yale College in Wrexham and the University of Wales). Since 2002, she has taught creative techniques designed to tender for the expansion of art education and the integration of artistic and aesthetic processes in the learning process (ARTuS! project). It focussed from 1997 to 2006 on ceramics in collaboration with the ceramicist Ilona Möbert, Cottbus and the companies Sachsen Porzellan, Freital und Arite, Meissen and with the jewellery designer Brit Kolleß, Dresden. Since 2004, she created film-making projects (Film „Wahlwerbung“ 2004, „Blickwinkel“ 2004–2005, „Wechselspiel“ 2006, „Nationalhymne“ 2007).

Since 1998, Grosse has worked mainly in the fields of printmaking, sculpture and installation. Since 2007 she also taught the art of painting and graphics at the music school "Gebrüder Graun" in Herzberg. She is a member of GEDOK. Since 2010, Grosse has been creating bronze figures in Thailand with Thomas Reichstein and Doreen Wolff.

== Exhibitions ==
- 2001 Gallery Beyer, Dresden
- 2002 Leonhardi-Museum
- 2003 Druckstöcke, "Erlebnisfest der Sinne" in the park of Großenhain
- 2003 Sieben hölzerne Kunstbänke, Gallery Roter Turm, Dresden.
- 2006 woodcuts, MTProject, Moscow
- 2006 In Bewegung, Produzentengalerie „M“ des BVBK e.V.
- 2007 Europäische Kunst, Il Ponte Gallery, Naples, Italy
- 2007 Grafikbiennale, Exhibition in Wales und England
- 2009 Engelsgeflüster, Doberlug castle
- 2010 Engelsgeflüster, Wilhelm-Morgner-Haus, Soest

== Works in the public domain ==
- Musèe 2000, Luxembourg
- Staatliche Kunstsammlungen der Landeshauptstadt Dresden
- Landtag Stuttgart
- Kulturstiftung des Freistaates Sachsen
- Royal College of Art, Graphics Collection, UK
- Kupferstichkabinett Dresden
- German Embassy Bangkok, Thailand

== Publications ==
- 1994 Catalogue „Vier in Dresden. Catrin Grosse, Caroline Kober, Katrin Kunert, Andreas Winkler“ (Exhibition of the Philip Morris Kunstförderung, Dresden 1994),
- 2004 Catalogue „Torf und Pantone“ (Kulturamt Dresden for the exhibition in Saite, Dresden),
- 2006 Catalogue „Druckstöcke“, (Kulturamt Dresden for the exhibition in Leonhardi-Museum Dresden),
- 2008 Catalogue „Lichtbogen“, (Vattenfall for the exhibition in the Vattenfall office in Cottbus)
