= Michael Moebius =

German pop-art artist

Michael Moebius is a German pop-art artist who became internationally known for his photorealistic Bubblegum portraits of icons of popular culture, as well as for a landmark copyright lawsuit in which a U.S. federal court awarded him US$120 million in 2023.

== Early life and education ==
Michael Moebius was born in 1968 in Pirna, East Germany. He initially trained in engineering and construction before being conscripted into the East German army shortly before the fall of the Berlin Wall, where he served as a tank driver. In the mid-1990s he studied anatomy as a guest student at the Dresden Academy of Fine Arts (Hochschule für Bildende Künste Dresden) and moved to Los Angeles in 1998 to pursue an international career as an artist.

In 2000 Moebius was discovered by Playboy founder Hugh Hefner and began working as an official Playboy illustrator and pin-up artist. During this period his focus gradually shifted toward pop art. In 2012 he created his first two Bubblegum portraits of Marilyn Monroe and Audrey Hepburn – works that would later become among his most recognizable pieces.

The Bubblegum series achieved worldwide visibility and was reproduced millions of times without authorization.

== Legal case and copyright ==
In 2023 a U.S. federal court in Illinois ruled in favor of Michael Moebius in a large-scale copyright case against several hundred online sellers who had distributed his artworks without permission. The court awarded statutory damages totaling US$120 million. The case drew wide attention in the art and media world and has been described as one of the largest copyright rulings involving a living artist, setting a precedent for the protection of intellectual property in the digital age.

Several international outlets reported on the decision and its implications for the art market and online counterfeiting, including La Gazette Drouot and Revolution. Moebius has also pursued legal action against the online retailer Redbubble and the Chinese conglomerate Shein.

== Collaborations and projects ==
In 2023 the historic German state-owned manufacturer Meissen Porcelain announced a collaboration with Moebius to create life-size porcelain busts based on his iconic Bubblegum portraits. The glass components for these works were produced in cooperation with the Mosser Glassworks in Karlovy Vary.

In the same year Moebius launched the petition Oscars for Legends, advocating posthumous Academy Awards for Marilyn Monroe, Elvis Presley, and James Dean. The initiative was inspired by his large-scale oil painting depicting the three icons celebrating their Oscars – awards they never received in their lifetimes.

In 2025 Moebius collaborated with the watchmaker Glashütte Original and was featured on the cover of Revolution magazine in connection with the model "PanoMaticCalendar – Blue of Dawn", which visually relates to his artistic themes.

== Media coverage ==
Throughout his career Moebius and his work have been featured in numerous international publications, including Playboy, Robb Report, Cosmopolitan, Daily Mail, Revolution, National Geographic Traveller UK, La Gazette Drouot, Casa Grazia, Architectural Digest, Superyacht Digest, and Mayfair Magazine. These features reflect the range of his artistic expression between pop culture, art history, and modern luxury aesthetics.

His official website and Instagram profile serve as an ongoing documentation of his current projects, collaborations, and exhibitions.
