= Clemens Braun =

German musician and teacher

Clemens Braun (1931) by Conrad Felixmüller

Clemens Braun (1862–1933) was a German musician, teacher, composer and organist from Dresden.

From 1876 to 1881 he was a student under Franz Wüllner at the Royal Conservatory of Music in Dresden. Braun was leader of the Dresdner Akademischen Gesangvereins from 1882 as well as of the Bach Society. From 1895 to 1898 he was organist at the Sophienkirche, and between 1898 and 1925 at the Annenkirche in Dresden.

Braun was a close friend of the painter Conrad Felixmüller, who painted his portrait and a woodcut depicting him on his deathbed.

He was buried in the cemetery in Klotzsche.
