= The Second Shot (1943 film) =

1943 film

- Directed by: Martin Frič
- Written by: Hugo Zehder; Martin Frič
- Starring: Gustav Waldau; Susi Nicoletti; Hana Vítová
- Edited by: Jan Roth
- Music by: Georg Sirnker
- Production company: Prag-Film
- Release date: 2 July 1943
- Running time: 92 minutes
- Country: Nazi Germany
- Language: German

The Second Shot (German: Der zweite Schuß) is a 1943 German historical drama film directed by Martin Frič and starring Gustav Waldau, Susi Nicoletti and Hana Vítová. It was shot at the Barrandov Studios in Prague.

== Cast ==
- Gustav Waldau as Baron von Neuhaus
- Susi Nicoletti as Irene Neuhaus
- Hana Vítová as Maris Schwanderer (as Hanna Witt)
- Richard Häussler as Georg von Romberg
- Ernst von Klipstein as Franz von Gerlach
- Pepi Glöckner-Kramer as Anna
- Eva Tinschmann as Fabrici
- Karl Günther as Stollberg (as Carl Günther)
- Fritz Kampers as Gastwirt
- Louis Soldan as Graf Altwyl
- Raoul Schránil as Mr. Neugebauer (as Roland Schranil)

== Bibliography ==
- Tereza Dvořáková & Ivan Klimeš. Prag-Film AG 1941–1945: im Spannungsfeld zwischen Protektorats- und Reichskinematografie. 2008.
