= Otto Gussmann =

German painter

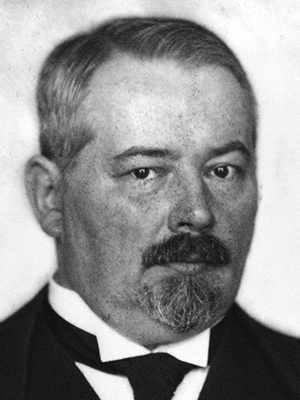
- Otto Gussmann; photograph by Hugo Erfurth
- Born: Otto Friedrich Gussmann'; May 22, 1869; Wachbach, Germany
- Died: 27 July 1926 (aged 57); Dresden, Germany
- Education: Berlin Academy of Fine Arts
- Style: Expressionism, Art Nouveau
- Spouse: Gertrud Herzog

Otto Friedrich Gussmann (22 May 1869, Wachbach, Main-Tauber-Kreis – 27 July 1926, Dresden) was a German decorative artist, designer, and art professor.

== Biography ==
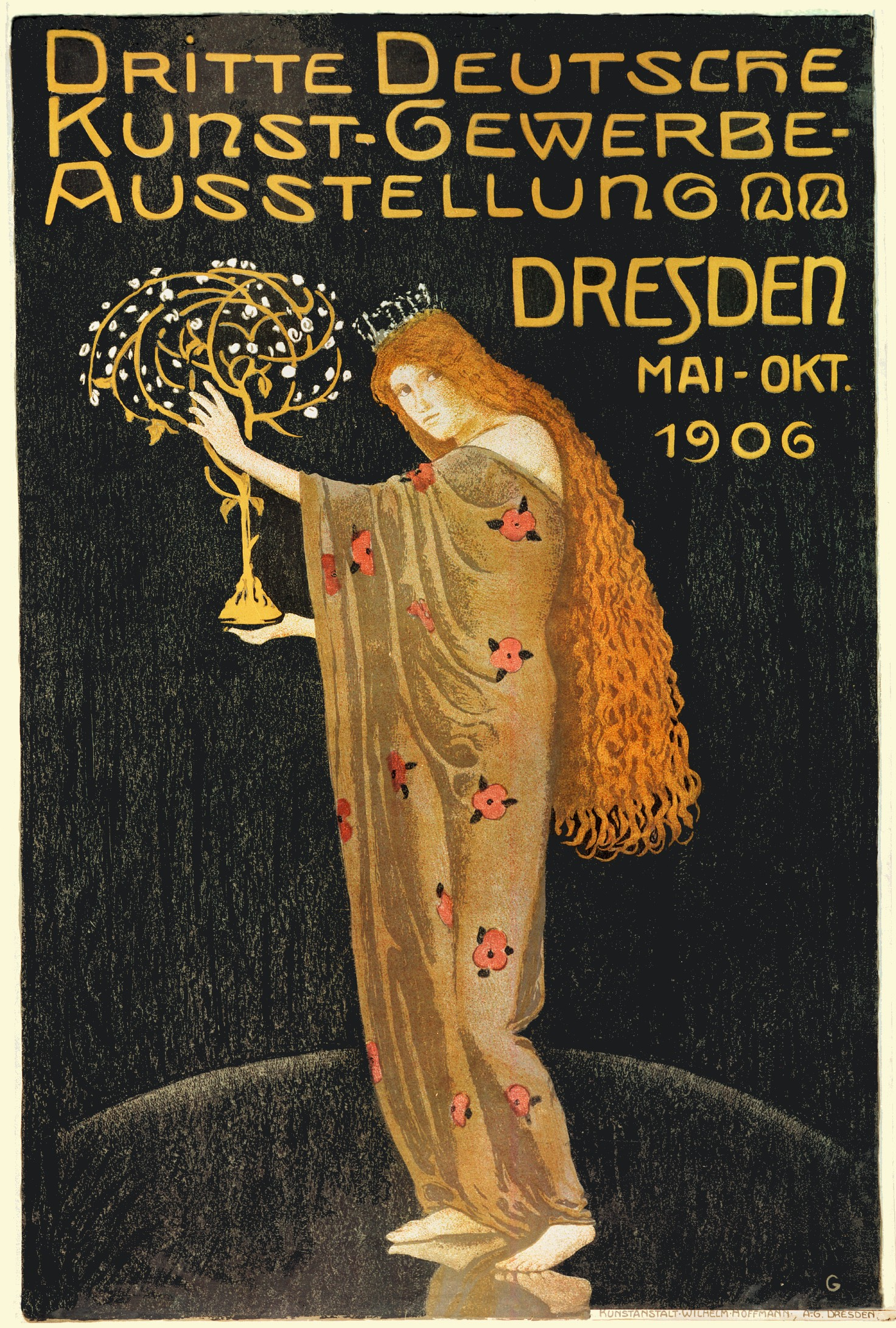
Poster for the Third German Exhibition

His father was a pastor. After completing secondary school, he began an apprenticeship with a decorative painter in Stuttgart. He also took classes at the Kunstgewerbeschule (now the State Academy of Fine Arts). In 1892, he moved to the teaching institute at the Kunstgewerbemuseum Berlin. Four years later, he began studying at the Berlin Academy of Fine Arts.

After completing his studies, he established his reputation with paintings and decorations for the new Reichstag, designed by Paul Wallot. In 1897, Wallot invited him to Dresden to become a teacher at the Academy of Fine Arts. The master school for decorative painting was opened under his direction in 1910. He would be named a Professor in 1915 and, four years later, he became Director of Studies; holding that position until his death.

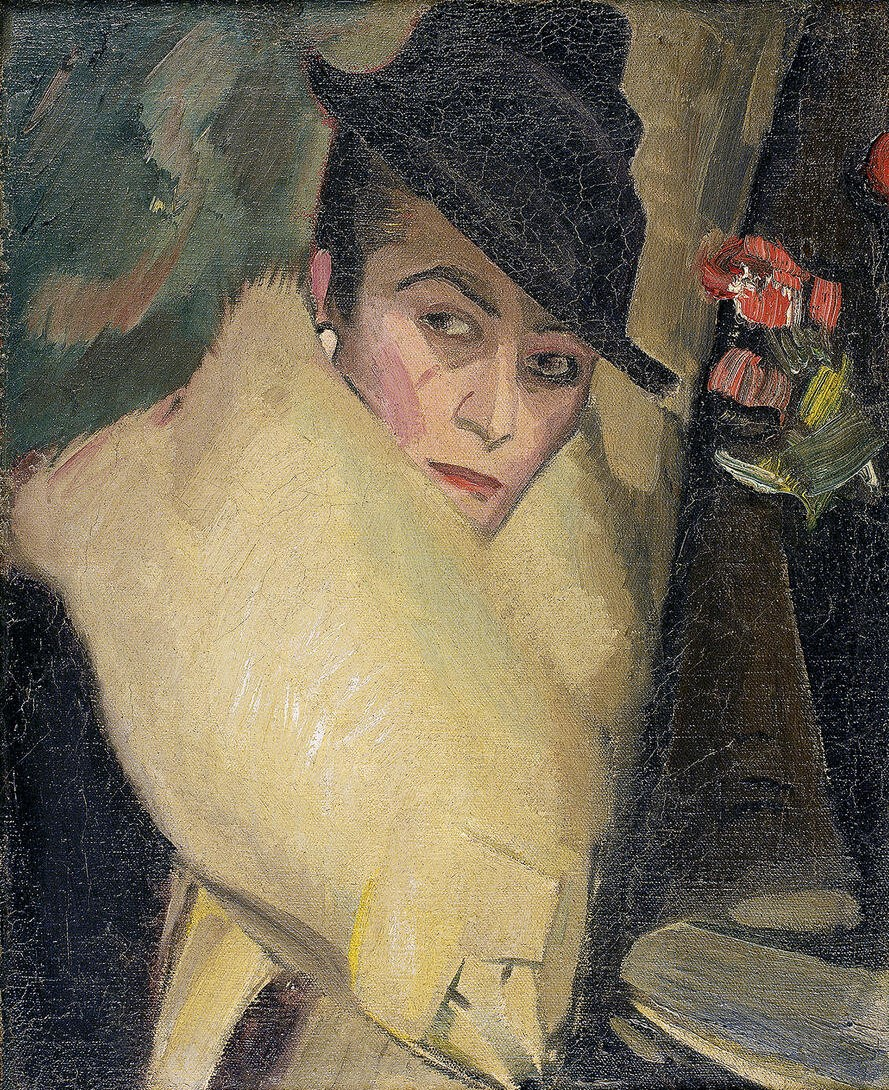
Lady with the White Fox Collar, Dresden Art Gallery collection

Around 1900, he joined the Association of Visual Artists; the progenitor of the Dresden Secession. He was married in 1904, to Gertrud Herzog (1877-1961), and they had three children. The following year, he joined a reform-oriented group known as Die Zunft (The Guild). In 1906, he designed the posters for the Third German Arts and Crafts Exhibition, in which Die Zunft played a major role.

He was also a member of the Deutscher Künstlerbund, as well as being a co-founder of the Künstlervereinigung Dresden and Die Brücke, a group of Expressionist artists. He taught several of their members, including Max Pechstein and Otto Dix.

During his years as a teacher, he also provided decorative art for the Lukaskirche (1903), the Sächsisches Ständehaus (1907), the Church of Reconciliation (1909), and the Neues Rathaus (1911), among others.

While preparing for an exhibition in 1926, he died of a heart attack. A street in the Strehlen district of Dresden has been named after him.

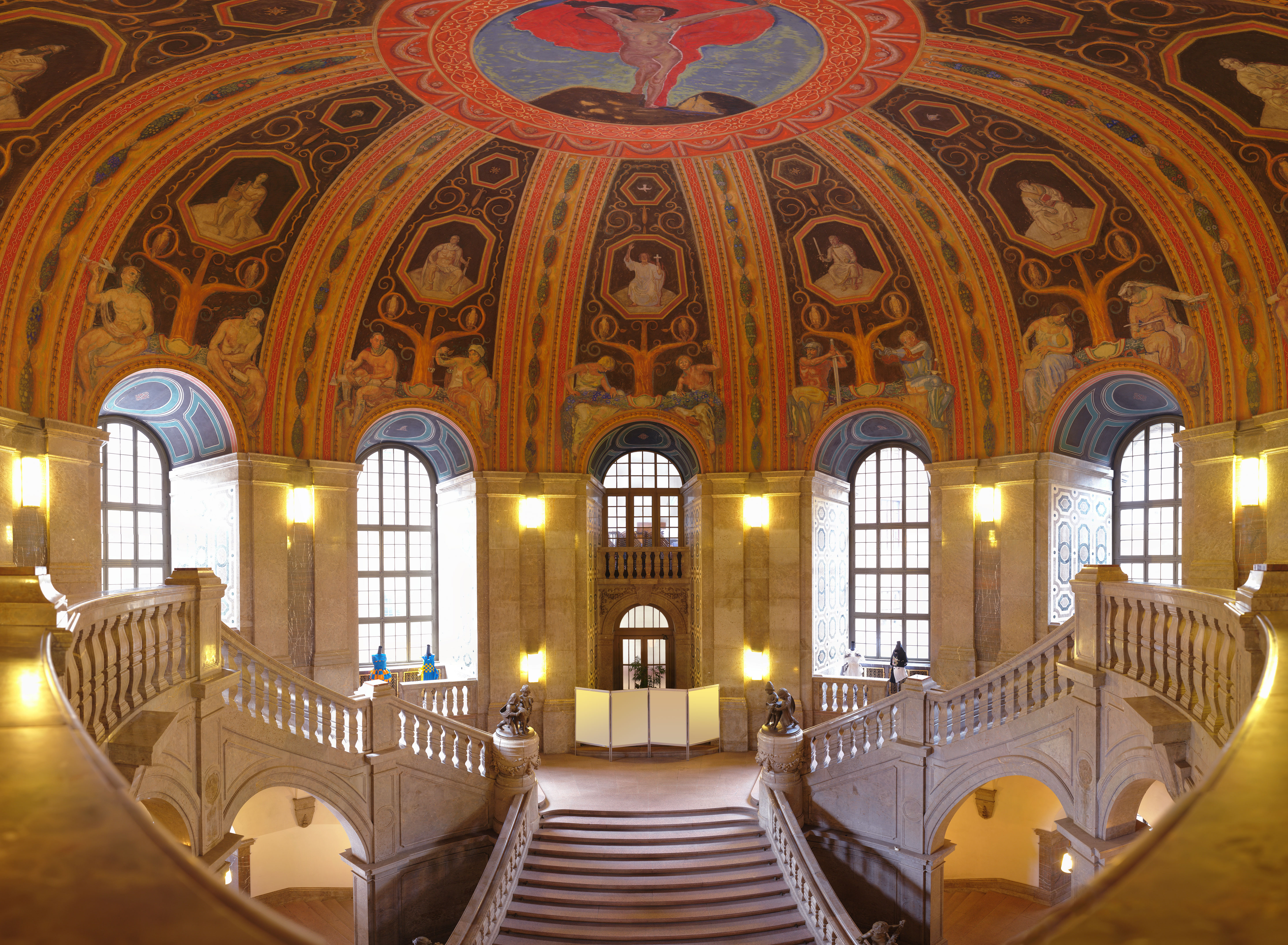
Decorative work at the Neues Rathaus, Dresden
