= Kurt Hilscher =

German illustrator

Kurt Hilscher (1904–1980) was a German commercial illustrator. Hilscher studied in 1924–1926 at the Dresden Academy of Fine Arts under Max Frey and in 1926 under Franz von Stuck in Munich. He lived in Paris from 1927 to 1934 where he was influenced by the work of Ludwig Hohlwein, Jean Carlu, Ch. Loupot, P. Colin, and AM Cassandre.
