= Thomas Reichstein =

German sculptor (born 1960)

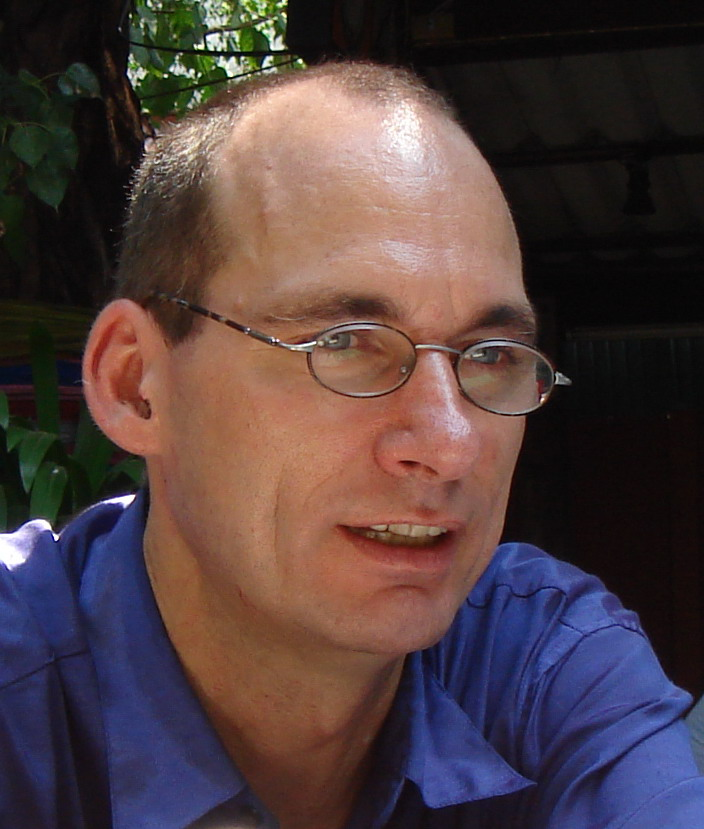
- Thomas Reichstein in Bangkok
- Born: 24 November 1960 (age 65); Halle/Saale, Germany
- Occupations: A German sculptor and artist

Thomas Reichstein (born 24 November 1960) is a German sculptor.

== Life ==
Thomas Reichstein was born in Halle/Saale. Starting as a gardener, he studied landscape architecture at the university in Dresden TU in Dresden from 1982 to 1984. After this he studied fine arts in the sculptor section of the art school in Dresden Hochschule für Bildende Künste Dresden. His teacher was professor Klaus Schwabe. He got his diploma in 1990.

He became a freelance sculptor in Dresden. From 1992 until 1997 he went to Ghana for three months every year to a brass casting village near Kumasi. Applying the lost wax technique, he produced small abstract and ornamental figures. These objects made him well known in Saxony.

In 1995 he started a workshop with the woodcarvers in Neuireland, an island of Papua. He learned to carve mangrove wood in the Malanggan style. One year later he went to Oro province in Papua. He made tapa cloth from the bark of a tropical mulberry tree. With this material and rattan sticks from Vietnam he created his Rattan-Tapa sculptures. He showed them for the first time in the ethnographic museum in Dresden.

As a result, Thomas Reichstein developed a special type of rattan bark cloth – sculptures. In 1997 he won a competition for the Semperoper Dresden for a yearly given award-sculpture. His idea impressed the jury with the balance of abstraction and reality. Thus he found the successful relation to music, singing and dancing the basic elements of the opera in an equal manner. Since then Reichstein received further orders for price-sculptures from politics and economy (e.g. Dresdner marketing price, MTM Award). From 1 January 1998 to 31 December 1998 taught Thomas Reichstein in the Saxon stonemason school in Demitz – Thumitz. He developed the stonework there specific technical basics of design and taught inter alia freehand drawing, sketching and modeling to nature. Since 1999, Thomas Reichstein operates several months a year in a Buddhafoundry in Ban Pong in Thailand. From 1999 to 2005 he created here a rich series of abstract sculptures. Since 2006 he worked there with the German artist Doreen Wolff and since 2010 even with Catrin Große.

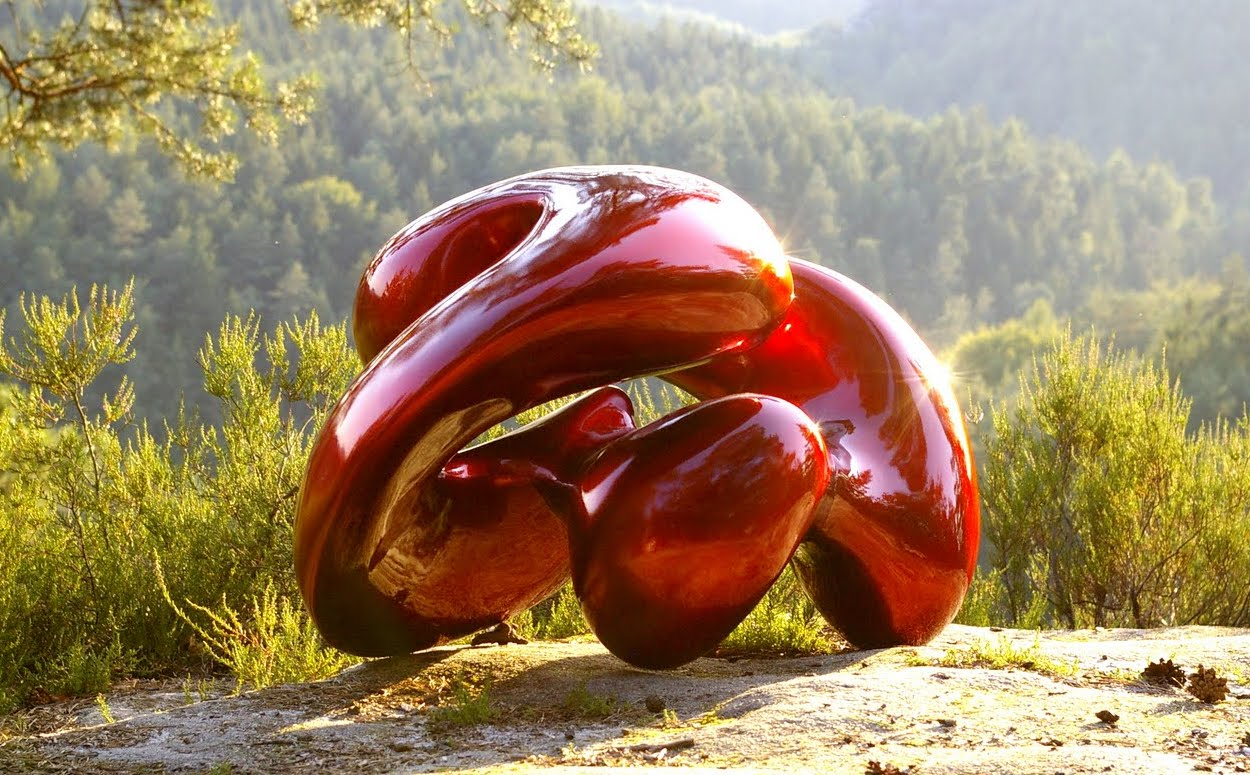
Red Pacific with red lacquer on alloy

Since 2006 he started to develop a big quantity of human figures.

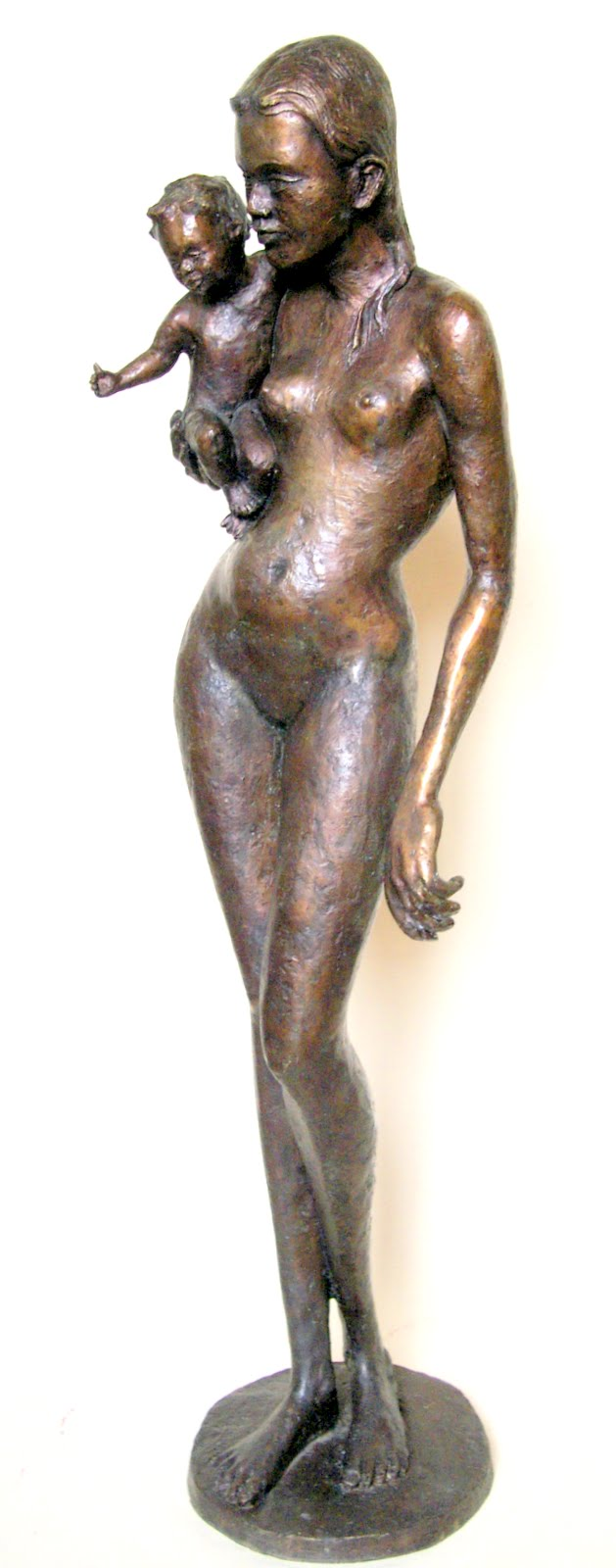
Mother and child after L.Cranach the elder

Since 2006, Thomas Reichstein used again reinforces the human figure to. So he created, for example, in 2009 a group of Nereids – the nymphs from the Mediterranean sea, inspired by classical Greek models from the British Museum in London. Figure table image

Thomas Reichstein was 2000–2012 Chairman of the Saxon artists association and 1997–2012 board member of the Federal Dresden artists. 2005 he was Member of the Board of the Association of Visual Artists (BBK) of Germany. Since 2012, Thomas Reichstein is the CEO of the New Saxon Art Association. Thomas Reichstein is father of four children.

In 2006, Thomas Reichstein wins with a digression into the world of geometry. He designed from Platonic, Archimedean and Catalan bodies a Polyeder-Circlesculpture and thus achieves a competition of Saxony for a study academy first place.

The first prize of a competition of Jena gets Reichstein in 2007 for his sculpture "Big Fish" and " Saalewave". These are very directly involved in the redesign of the promenade along the river Saale in Jena. They are especially designed with a safety ground on touching. The overall project receives in 2009 the Thuringian landscape architecture award.

Since 2010, Thomas Reichstein begins a new convolute from life-sized bronze figures, which has grown by 2013 to 25 works. These develop from creations in statuesque appeal to Lucas Cranach the Elder, to freely moving, dance and expressive representations.

Since first May operates Thomas Reichstein with the painter and sculptor Doreen Wolff, a co-operative gallery in the city center of Dresden, 20 Schlossstrasse, Castle Street in which they show only their own works of art.

== Working stays in foreign countries ==
- Bulgaria – Plowdiw, 1983, landscape drawings as student of landscape architecture.
- Sowjet Union – Leningrad, 1987, Studies in the eremitage and the studio of Michail Anikuschin as student of the dresden school of fine arts.
- France – Paris, Oktobre 1989, exhibition in the culture centre of the GDR in Paris, with a study visit.
- Ghana – Kumasi 1992–1997 every year for three month Thomas Reichstein is a sting series of small sculptures in bronze.
- France – Montpellier/Clermont de Herault, by invitation of the French culture centre in Dresden Thomas Reichastein works with Mrs. Chris Matthia in South France
- Papua-New guinea – Neuirland, 1995 and 1996, Reichtein works together with traditional woodcarvers.
- Kolumbien - Sierra Nevada de Santa Marta, 1998, Work with Indians from the ribe of the Kogi.
- Thailand – Ban Pong/Ratchaburi, 1999 bis 2023, every year work in a big Buddha casting factory in Ban Pong.
- Italien – Laas/Südtirol, 2011, Work with marble and exhibition

== Exhibitions ==
- Galerie Gebrüder Lehmann 1990 "Ferrum Vitalis"
- Galerie Autogen, 1991 "Stahl axial"
- Landhaus Dresden, Städtische Galerie 1992.
- Otomfo – Okomfo: afrikanischer Gelbguss von Thomas Reichstein 1992–1994, Kurator: Uwe J Gellner, Kloster unser Lieben Frauen, Museen der Stadt Magdeburg
- Export Import, Thomas Reichstein mit L. Azure, H. Lippmann and H. Stark: 2 October to 6 November 1994, Galerie Rähnitzgasse der Landeshauptstadt Dresden
- Thomas Reichstein – Kunstverständigung über Kontinente. 1. Oeuvreausstellung in den Staatlichen Kunstsammlungen Dresden durch die Skulpturensammlung im Albertinum. 29 October 2000 to 31 January 2001, Kuratorin: Bärbel Stephan, kommissarische Direktorin der Skulpturensammlung der Staatlichen Kunstsammlungen Dresden
- Galerie Sybille Nütt 2004, von quellgöttern, jungen pferden und dieser ahnung vom urklang der dinge ...
- Galerie Tatzl Graz/Österreich 2006, Thomas Reichstein "auf draht" & Hans Staudacher
- Figur-Abstrakt Ausstellungstrilogie in Bangkok in der deutschen Botschaft, im Goetheinstitut und im Central World Center. March to April 2008, Initiator und Kurator W. Eckstein, Direktor des Goetheinstituts.
- Seemannskirche Prerow 2011, Ne-re-i-den und andere Bronze-Plastiken
- Kunstverein Worpswede 2011; "Klavier und Geige - Werke von Karl Oppermann und Thomas Reichstein" mit Prof. Karl Oppermann, Berlin
- Markuskirche in Laas/Italien 2011
- Schloss Pillnitz, 2011
- Doreen Wolff und Thomas Reichstein: "Paar-a-dox", 2012, Galerie in der Landesdirektion des Freistaates Sachsen
- Bibliothek Stettin/Polen mit Timm Stütz 2013.
- Stadtarchiv der Landeshauptstadt Dresden 2013 mit Doreen Wolff
- Kunstverein Worpswede, Sommerfreiluftausstellung "Livesize, Together-Alone", Sommer 2014
- Galerie Waidspeicher der Landeshauptstadt Erfurt, November – December 2014 with Andreas Eichstaedt, Plastiken und Malerei
- Doppelausstellung in Westerland auf Sylt, May to September 2015 Sechs lebensgroße Figuren auf dem Rathausvorplatz, May 2015 Galerie "Alte Post" mit dem Kunstverein "Kunstfreunde Sylt": Plastiken und Malerei von Thomas Reichstein und Doreen Wolff

== Works ==
- Arche – copperfigure. Dresden zoo, 1995.
- Elbewaechter – sandstone. Tangermuende, 1998.
- Mamawata Ostara – sandstone, Ostritz/Neisse, 2000.
- Kentauer – bamboofigure. Dresden, 2001. Olbrichtplatz, Dresden
- Minos – stainless steel Dresden, 2002. Stuebelallee, Nähe Comeniusplatz
- Saalewelle and Big Fisch – broncesculptures, Wenigenjenaer Riverbanks in Jena, 2007.
- Wuerfelwiese – Polyederring, campus of the Staatlichen Studienakadamie in Riesa, 2006
- Nereidengruppe – brassfugures. German embassy Bangkok, 2010.

== Books ==
- Baerbel Stephan: Minos Centauros – Thomas Reichstein. Ernst-Rietschel-Kulturring, Dresden 2001, ISBN 3-933109-09-4.
- Thomas Reichstein: Otomfo, Okomfo. Afrikanischer Gelbguss. 1992–1994. Magdeburger Museen, Kloster Unser Lieben Frauen, Magdeburg 1994, ISBN 3-930030-06-3 (catalogue of the exhibition at Kloster Unser Lieben Frauen, 1994).
- Landeshauptstadt Dresden, Kulturamt: Thomas Reichstein. Kulturamt der Landeshauptstadt, Dresden 1994 (catalogue of the exhibition "Export Import", 1994 in the gallery "Rähnitzgasse").
