= Walter Rheiner =

German expressionist writer

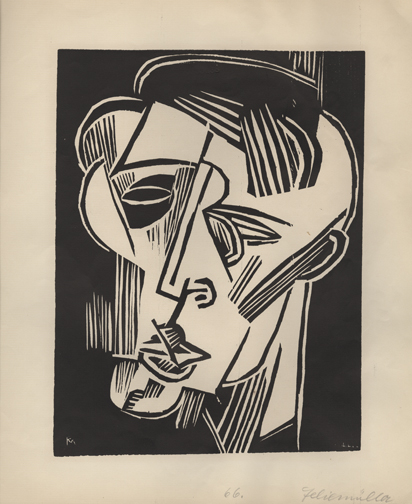
- A portrait of Rheiner by Conrad Felixmüller titled Der Dichter Walter Rheiner, 1918. From the collections of the Vanderbilt Museum
- Born: Walter Heinrich Schnorrenberg; March 18, 1895; Cologne, Rhine Province, German Empire
- Died: June 12, 1925 (aged 30); Charlottenburg, Greater Berlin, Weimar Republic
- Resting place: Kaiser Wilhelm Memorial Cemetery
- Occupation: Writer
- Spouse: Amalie Friederike née Olle
- Children: 1
- Writing career
- Language: German
- Years active: 1916-1920
- Period: 20th century
- Genre: Poetry
- Literary movement: Post-expressionism
- World War I
- Allegiance: German Empire
- Branch: German Army
- Service years: 1914–1917
- Conflicts: Eastern Front

Walter Rheiner (18 March 1895 – 12 June 1925; born Walter Heinrich Schnorrenberg in Cologne, Germany) was a writer and poet associated with the German post-expressionists.

== Biography ==
In 1895, Walter Rheiner was born in Cologne, Germany, to his mother, Ernestine Schnorrenberg, and his father.

Rheiner married Amalie Friederike Schnorrenberg, whom he affectionately called 'Fo'. They divorced in 1925.

During World War I (ca 1914 - 1918), Rheiner fought on the Eastern Front.

Rheiner published poems and prose works throughout his life. His work drew comparisons to contemporaries such as Georg Trakl and Franz Kafka. Rheiner's greatest period of literary output was from 1916 to 1920.

One of Rheiner's most fertile artistic relationships was with the German expressionist painter Conrad Felixmüller. Through connections due to this relationship, Rheiner's work was able to be published. Felixmüller illustrated Rheiner's novella.

In his last five years, from 1920 to his death in 1925, Rheiner's poetic output decreased. This has been attributed to factors such as poverty and drug addiction.

=== Drug use and death ===
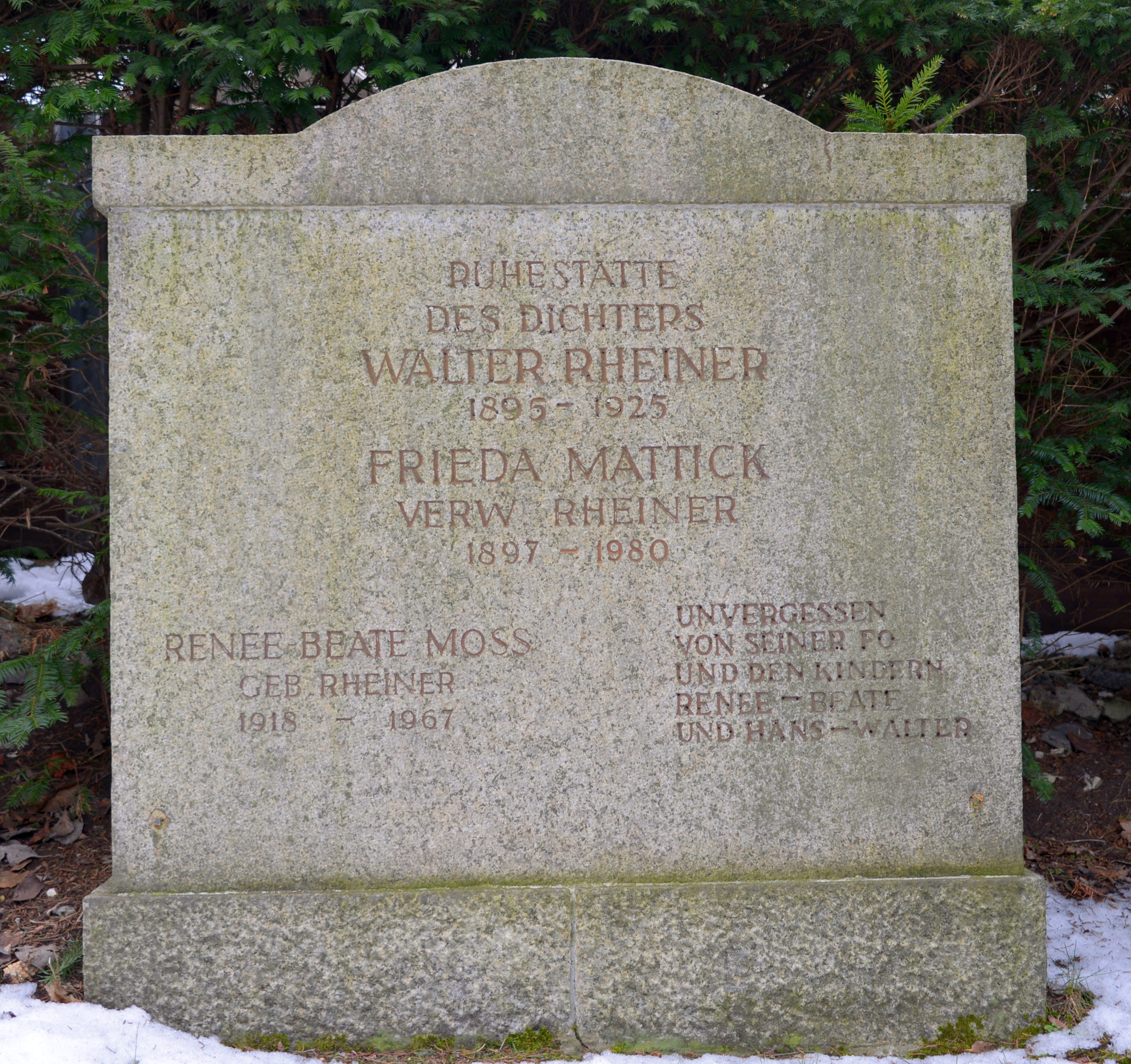
Walter Rheiner's gravestone in Berlin.

Rheiner is often-remembered for his tragic association with substance abuse. This is exemplified in his major prose work Kokain (cocaine). Kokain was written in the summer of 1918 and serves as a typical example of how autobiographical themes run through Rheiner's work. He had become addicted to cocaine in 1915 during the war.

In 1925, Rheiner died. His death was attributed to heavy use of morphine.

Following Rheiner's death, Felixmüller honoured his friend with a well-known portrait, Der Tod des Dichters Walter Rheiner.

== Publications ==
- Kokain, novella, 1918.
- Das schmerzliche Meer, poems, 1918.
- Der bunte Tag, poems, 1919.

== Bibliography ==
- Millington, Richard H. (2012). Snow from Broken Eyes: Cocaine in the Lives and Works of Three Expressionist Poets. Peter Lang. ISBN 9783034310697.
