= Sandra Rauch =

German artist

Sandra Rauch (Berlin, 1967) is a German artist.

Sandra Rauch began to study communication design in 1991 in (Berlin Kommunikationsdesign) and she changed in 1995 to the Dresden Academy of Fine Arts to study painting and graphic techniques. From 1993 to 1998, she travelled to Italy and France. In 1998, she became a master-class pupil with Prof. Kerbach and finished in 2000. Since 2000 she works as an assistant of Prof. Kerbach in the HfBK Dresden.

In her works, created with peculiar own photomechanical style, she plays didactically with the formative possibilities of digital and analogous pictures to give expression to the everyday culture in our world.

== Scholarships ==
- 1998 HSPIII Stipendium der Stadt Dresden
- 1998 Hegenbarth Stipendium der Stadtsparkasse Dresden

== Exhibitions ==
- 2006 Downtown; Galerie Horschik Dresden
- 2005 XIV. Deutsche Grafik-Triennale Frechen (Cologne)
- 2003 solo exhibition Galerie Horschik Dresden
- 2002 100 Sächsische Grafiken; traveling exhibition (Europe)
- 2002 Jelly Fish in Space; Kunstsalon Europa (Berlin)
- 2002-1998 owner of the Kunstsalon Europa
- 2000 San.Di.Commander; Mousonturm Frankfurt am Main
- 1998 Flying Wentworth (film); art`otel Dresden
