= Lasar Segall =

Lithuanian-Brazilian artist (1891–1957)

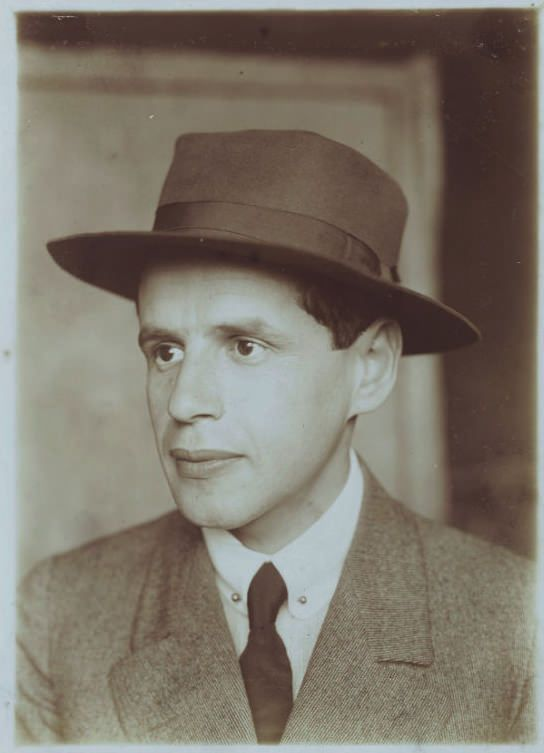
- Born: Lasar Segall; July 21, 1891; Vilnius, Russian Empire
- Died: August 2, 1957 (aged 68); São Paulo, Brazil
- Education: Prussian Academy of Arts, Dresden Art Academy, Semana de Arte Moderna movement
- Movement: Impressionist, Expressionist, Modernist

Lasar Segall (July 21, 1891 – August 2, 1957) was a Lithuanian and Brazilian painter, engraver and sculptor. Segall's work is derived from impressionism, expressionism and modernism. His most significant themes were depictions of human suffering, war, persecution and prostitution.

== Early life and education ==
Segall was born in Vilnius, Russian Empire, the son of a Torah scribe.

Segall moved to Berlin at the age of 15 and studied first at Berlin Königliche Akademie der Künste from 1906 to 1910. At the end of 1910 he moved to Dresden to continue his studies at the Kunstakademie Dresden as a "Meisterschüler".

Segall moved to Brazil in 1923 and, already separated from his first wife, married in 1925 Jenny Klabin (daughter of Maurício Freeman Klabin, founder of Klabin, one of the world’s largest paper and pulp companies), with whom he had two sons: Maurício Klabin Segall (who, in the 1950s, would marry actress Beatriz Segall, one of the greatest ladies of Brazilian theater and television drama, remembered for her iconic role as Odete Roitman) and Oscar Klabin Segall.

== Career ==
=== Expressionist Forum ===
Segall published a book of five etchings in Dresden, Sovenirs of Vilna in 1919, and two books illustrated with lithographs titled Bubu and die Sanfte. He then began to express himself more freely and developed his own style, which incorporated aspects of Cubism, while exploring his own Jewish background. His earlier paintings throughout 1910 to the early 1920s depicted troubled figures surrounded in claustrophobic surroundings with exaggerated and bold features, influenced by African tribal figures.

In 1912 his first painted series of works were conducted in an elderly insane asylum. Segall's work largely portrayed the masses of persecuted humanity in his Expressionist form. Later that year, he moved to São Paulo, Brazil, where three of his siblings were already living.

He returned to Dresden in 1914 and was still quite active in the Expressionist style. In 1919 Segall founded the 'Dresdner Sezession Gruppe 1919' with Otto Dix, Conrad Felixmüller, Otto Lange and other artists. Segall's exhibition at the Galery Gurlitt received multiple awards. However successful Segall was in Europe, he had already been greatly influenced by his time spent in Brazil, which had already transformed both his style and his subject matter. The visit to Brazil gave Segall the opportunity to obtain a strong idea of South American art and, in turn, made Segall return to Brazil yet again.

=== Beginnings in Brazil: Modernist trends ===
Though Segall was still a Russian citizen, he moved back to Brazil in 1923. Upon Segall's return to São Paulo he obtained Brazilian citizenship along with his first wife, Margarete.

While in Brazil, his paintings were influenced heavily by the Red Light District in Rio de Janeiro. Many Brazilian artists influenced Segall's subject matter and strengthened his Cubist form. He became acclimated within his newfound country and painted themes contributing to Brazil's countryside, mulattoes, favelas, prostitutes and plantations. Due to the harsh and extreme nature of Segall's portrayal of prostitutes and his depiction of human suffering, his artwork became controversial. This particular controversy in his artwork caused he and other well known artists to organize a pro Modernist event known as the Semana de Arte Moderna.

In the year 1922, the Semana de Arte Moderna was organized Segall included, being one of the mainstream forerunners in the art exhibition. The week-long event included Segall's work, as well as Anita Malfatti's largely controversial artwork. Not only were paintings included, but performances and other art forms were conducted at the event. Segall's avant garde innovations ranked him highly among other Brazilian outstanding modern artists during that time, like Candido Portinari and Emiliano Di Cavalcanti.

Though Segall had intended to reside exclusively in Brazil, he continued to return and forth to Europe for his own personal exhibitions. In 1925, Segall became extremely close to his pupil Jenny Klabin and eventually married her.

=== Sociedade Pro-Arte Moderna (SPAM) ===
In 1932, shortly after Segall's multiple visits to Paris and Germany he founded an organization along with other artists known as Sociedade Pro-Arte Moderna (SPAM). The organization was short lived (November 1932 - December 1934). Similar to the Semana de Arte Moderna, the organization included members of São Paulo's earliest modernist forerunners. SPAM's central idea was to serve as a link between artists, intellectuals, collectors, patrons, and the public as a whole. SPAM was also created to serve as a public environment for vanguard art in Brazil.

SPAM consisted of two exhibitions. The first exhibition showed works from the artists of the School of Paris from multiple São Paulo collections which acknowledged Brazilian artists of the time. The controversial Modernist artist, Tarsila do Amaral, also held her artworks in the exhibition as well as works of local artists such as Anita Malfatti, Victor Brecheret, John Graz, Regina Graz and Rossi Osir. The second half of the exhibition consisted of solely Brazilian artists from São Paulo and Rio de Janeiro- such as di Cavalcanti, Ismael Nery, Portinari and Alberto da Veiga Guignard.

Also similar to the Semana de Arte Moderna, two significant "balls" were held by the leaders of the organization. The rooms in which the balls were held were named "Cidade de SPAM" (City of SPAM). Though these balls seemed to be fund raising events, they were merely performances to make audiences think about the ever-changing movement in Brazil. They consisted of live musical acts, dancers, built scenery and artwork and ornate costumes. The sets were meant to portray "mini towns", and SPAM even had its own newspapers, anthem and multiple governing bodies.

Segall's works included in the SPAM exhibition were two of his most important series of paintings in 1935; Campos do Jordao landscapes and the Portraits of Lucy. Lucy was an understudy pupil and Segall conducted a series of images dedicated to her. Campos do Jordao landscapes and the Portraits of Lucy depicted the world's outbreak of war, it portrayed genocides and indefinite tragedy.

The organization of SPAM fought for justice yet, disagreements arose between Integralists, known as Brazilian Fascists, that discriminated against foreigners in Brazil, especially Jews. With this large amount of controversy and intolerable strain on SPAM's membership, the group soon fell apart. A defeated Segall meant that the driving force behind the organization had come to an end.

=== Controversy in Europe ===
Segall's work was still gaining much positive credit still in Brazil, despite the dissolution of SPAM. The positive feedback considers Segall one of Brazil's most influential modernist artists. Although, back in Europe, his work was considered degenerate and preposterous. Specifically in Germany, his artwork was no longer able to be shown in exhibits. Fascism was rising quickly in Germany and many believed Segall's work to portray negatively on Europe's economic status due to the largely acknowledged outbreak of war.

This particular negative impact on his artwork then forced Segall to create a series of images of his troubled Jewish childhood and to depict the large number of emigration waves that he grew up with, as well. These images also portrayed universal suffering of human existence.

=== Later years ===
Still haunted by Rio de Janeiro's Mangue, Segall created images that stayed throughout his late career. Much of his earlier impact of human suffering led Segall to create one of his most famous artworks in 1939 and 1940, known as Navio de emigrantes (Ship of Emigrants). The image depicts a heavily condensed and large number of people on the dock of a ship. Although this does not coincide with much of Segall's previous work of human suffering, this provides the audience with a deep depiction of (at the time) the contemporary and controversial waves of emigrants and human affliction and persecution.

Later in the mid-1940s, Segall published his series of Mangue drawings that revealed poverty, specifically in the Rio de Janeiro slums. Becoming wholeheartedly closer to his Brazilian nationality, Segall portrays these images in a stark manner, yet the underprivileged and oppressed images provides a significant cultural identity for the Rio de Janeiro inhabitants.

From 1949 until his death in 1957, he continued to work on engraving and painting Mangue as well as producing a series entitled Wandering Women and Forests.

== Subject matter and themes ==
Segall's subject matter was portrayed more subtly and softer in his early career. He did not depict much of the African influence on his artwork until he moved to Brazil. It was not until Segall visited Brazil for the first few times, that he branched out towards the Expressionist style. He was able to express himself in a freer manner while he portrayed the lifelong theme of his Jewish culture depicting the tribulations of European Jews. Although he was a humanist, he never forgot his Jewish roots.

Segall's initial paintings in Brazil reflect a strong national connection and passion for his newfound homeland. He portrayed the landscapes in São Paulo and Rio de Janeiro and portrayed the different races without tension or malintention. However, Segall remained faithful towards his Cubist nature throughout the majority of his artworks. Specifically, one of his famous artworks, entitled Banana Plantation, shows a Brazilian banana plantation, thick in density. Segall achieved balance in this painting by centering the worker's neck and head protruding from the bottom of the painting. This causes the audience to be fully focused towards the center space. This significant symmetrical balance emphasizes the human element involved in the Brazilian agricultural system. The diminished amount of slavery in Brazil during this time period, the 1920s, abolished Brazilian-Negro slaves and replaced them with an overwhelming number of European workers coming to Brazil. This particular image portrays the engulfment of the plantations by the Europeans.

Other prominent theme in Segall's work is human suffering and emigration. In another famous artwork of Segall's, entitled Ship of Emigrants, a ship dock is overcrowded and engulfed with emigrant passengers. Not only does the image portray a dark and saddening emotion, but it significantly portrays the troubled figures aboard the ship. The solemn faces and lack of expression on the passengers blatantly shows the harsh reality of emigrants and their depressing lifestyles of forced moves.

== Museu Lasar Segall ==
Lasar Segall's home in São Paulo is now a museum, featuring his furniture, books, plants, as well his most famous works. It is also a non-profit organization respected highly among the community of São Paulo.

Museu Lasar Segall is also a center for the art community in São Paulo to participate in monitored cultural activities regularly. Art classes such as photography, engraving and the study of film are held in Segall's home. Also incorporated in the Museum is a large, highly acclaimed art library that holds specific books directed towards photography and the arts of spectacle.

The Museu Lasar Segall is preserved to explore the stimulating experiences within multiple forms of art while still keeping a Brazilian cultural identity. The form of art conducted in Brazil is of one entirely different than other art forms. The Museum is intact today because of Brazil's concern to maintain their strong nationality and to preserve Lasar Segall's culturally influenced art dedicated for Brazil.

== Exhibitions ==
- March 1913 solo exhibition in São Paulo; June 1913 solo exhibition in Campinas
- 1920 large solo exhibition at the Museum Folkwang in Hagen; solo exhibition at the Schames Gallery in Frankfurt
- 1922 takes part in International Art Exhibition in Düsseldorf
- 1924 solo exhibition in São Paulo
- 1926 exhibition at the Galerie Nierendorf, Berlin and another exhibition at Neue Kunst Fides Gallery, Dresden
- 1927 solo exhibition in São Paulo
- 1928 solo exhibition at the Rio Palace Hotel, Rio de Janeiro
- 1935 takes part in the International Painting Exhibition at Carnegie Institute, Pittsburgh
- 1937 ten of his works are shown at the Nazi- Sponsored Degenerate Art Exhibition, Munich
- 1938 solo exhibition at Renou et Colle Gallery, Paris
- 1945 takes part in the exhibition Art Condemned by the Third Reich, Askanazy Gallery, Rio de Janeiro
- 1948 solo exhibition at Associated American Artists Galleries, New York

== List of artworks ==
- tres jovens 1939, bronze sculpture, pinacoteca, Sao Paulo, Brazil
- Os eternos caminhantes (The Eternal Wanderers), 1919, oil on canvas, Museu Lasar Segall, São Paulo
- Nude Female Bust, 1920, pencil sketch, Museu Lasar Segall, São Paulo
- Banana Plantation, 1927, oil on canvas, State Picture Gallery, São Paulo
- Brazilian Landscape, 1927, watercolor, Museu Lasar Segall, São Paulo
- The Third Class, 1928, drypoint on paper, Museu Lasar Segall, São Paulo
- Rua do Mangue (Street of Mangue), 1928, drypoint and etching on paper, Museu Lasar Segall, São Paulo
- Primeira classe (First Class), 1929, drypoint and etching on paper, Museu Lasar Segall, São Paulo
- Emigrantes (Emigrants), 1929, drypoint on paper, Museu Lasar Segall, São Paulo
- Favela (Shantytown), 1930, drypoint on paper, Museu Lasar Segall, São Paulo
- Figura feminina reclinada (Reclining Woman), 1930, oil on canvas, Private Collection, São Paulo
- Navio de emigrantes (Ship of Emigrants), 1939–1940, oil with sand on canvas, Museu Lasar Segall, São Paulo
- Woman from the 'Mangue' with Persiennes, 1942, woodcut on Japanese paper, Museu Lasar Segall, São Paulo
