= Doreen Dredge =

Canadian athlete (born 1931)

Personal information
- Born: 14 July 1931 (age 95) Kelvington, Saskatchewan, Canada

Sport
- Sport: Athletics
- Event: High jump

Doreen M. Dredge (born 14 July 1931) is a Canadian athlete. She competed in the women's high jump at the 1948 Summer Olympics.
