= Hugo Zehder =

Hugo Zehder was a German artist who became a prominent publisher of art journals in Dresden following the First World War. He launched the Neue Blätter für Kunst und Dichtung (The New Journal for Art and Literature) in May 1918. Zehder was an early member of the Dresdner Sezession and placed the journal at its service.

His play Der zweite Schuß was made into a film, The Second Shot in 1943.
