= Dresden Secession =

German art group

The Dresdner Sezession (Dresden Secession) was an art group aligned with German Expressionism founded by Otto Schubert, Conrad Felixmüller and his pupil Otto Dix in Dresden, during a period of political and social turmoil in the aftermath of World War I. The group's activity spanned from 1919 until its final collective exhibition in 1925. During its heyday, the group consisted of some of the most influential and prominent expressionist artists of their generations, including Will Heckrott, Lasar Segall, Otto Schubert and Constantin von Mitschke-Collande, as well as the architect Hugo Zehder and writers Walter Rheiner, Heinar Schilling, and Felix Stiemer.

In 1918, Conrad Felixmüller moved to Dresden, where he became the founder and chairman of the group. During his activities in Germany's progressive art and youth movements, Felixmüller worked for various newspapers including Die Sichel in Regensburg and Rote Erde in Hamburg). The Dresdner Sezessionists were heavily influenced by many of the other contemporary German art movements of their day. Many of the members kept a close eye on the flourishing avant-garde art movements such as the Dadaists. Artists like Dix adopted and appropriated many traits of dada such as the use of collage compositions into his own expressionistic style. Many founding members including Felixmüller, Dix and Schubert were active in a variety of other socially conscious, incendiary groups such the Novembergruppe.

== Later years under the Third Reich ==
Even though the group was officially dissolved in 1925 due to financial difficulties, the members would continue to have active and relatively successful political and artistic careers until the 1930s-40s when many were considered "Degenerates" by the newly formed Nazi Government and declared enemies of the state. Under antimodernist Alfred Rosenberg, many forms of modern art including Impressionism, Abstract, Cubism, Dada and Expressionism were declared illegal in the German state in preference for more realistic classical styles. This legislation led to an aggressive and oppressive smear campaign in order to curb and stamp out modern art. Suddenly Felixmüller, Dix and the rest of the former secessionists found their studios being raided by the Gestapo and their paintings burned in the streets. Many artists considered lost their jobs at universities and museums and were forbidden from painting under threat of imprisonment. The few Jewish members, like the Brazilian-Lithuanian artist Segall, faced particularly harsh persecution and quickly emigrated from Germany; Segall himself moved to Brazil.
