= Dresden Academy of Fine Arts =

Fine arts university in Dresden, Germany

Coordinates: 51°03′10″N 13°44′33″E

- Hochschule für Bildende Künste Dresden
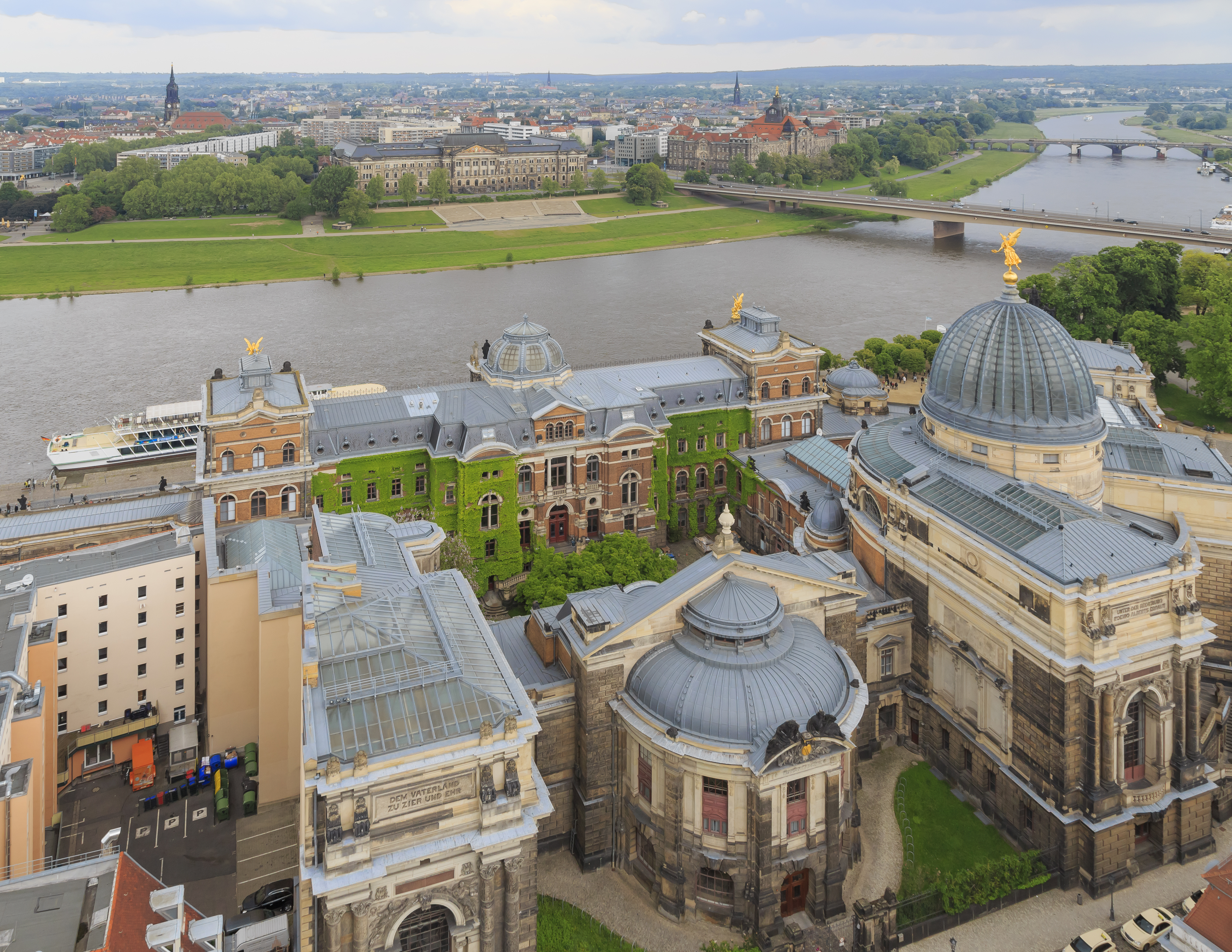
- Type: Public
- Established: 1764; 262 years ago
- Chancellor: Jochen Beißert
- Rector: Matthias Flügge
- Location: Dresden, Saxony, Germany
- Campus: Urban
- Website: www.hfbk-dresden.de/

The Dresden Academy of Fine Arts (German Hochschule für Bildende Künste Dresden), often abbreviated HfBK Dresden or simply HfBK, is a vocational university of visual arts located in Dresden, Germany. The present institution is the product of a merger between the famous Dresden Art Academy, founded in 1764, the workplace and training ground of a number of influential European artists, and another well-established local art school, Hochschule für Werkkunst Dresden, after World War II.

== History ==
=== Buildings ===
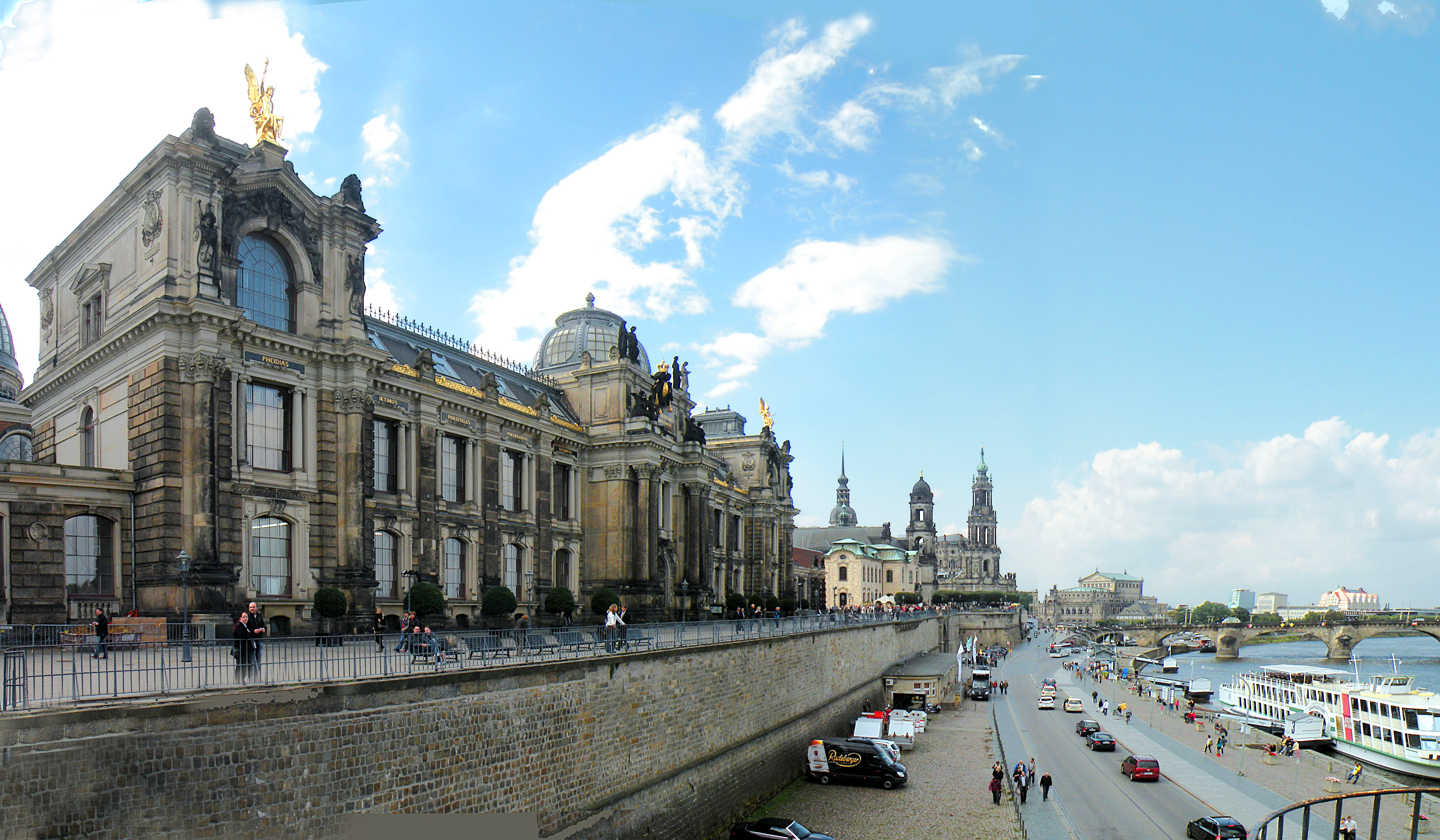
The Dresden Academy of Fine Arts on Brühl's Terrace, view of the front side

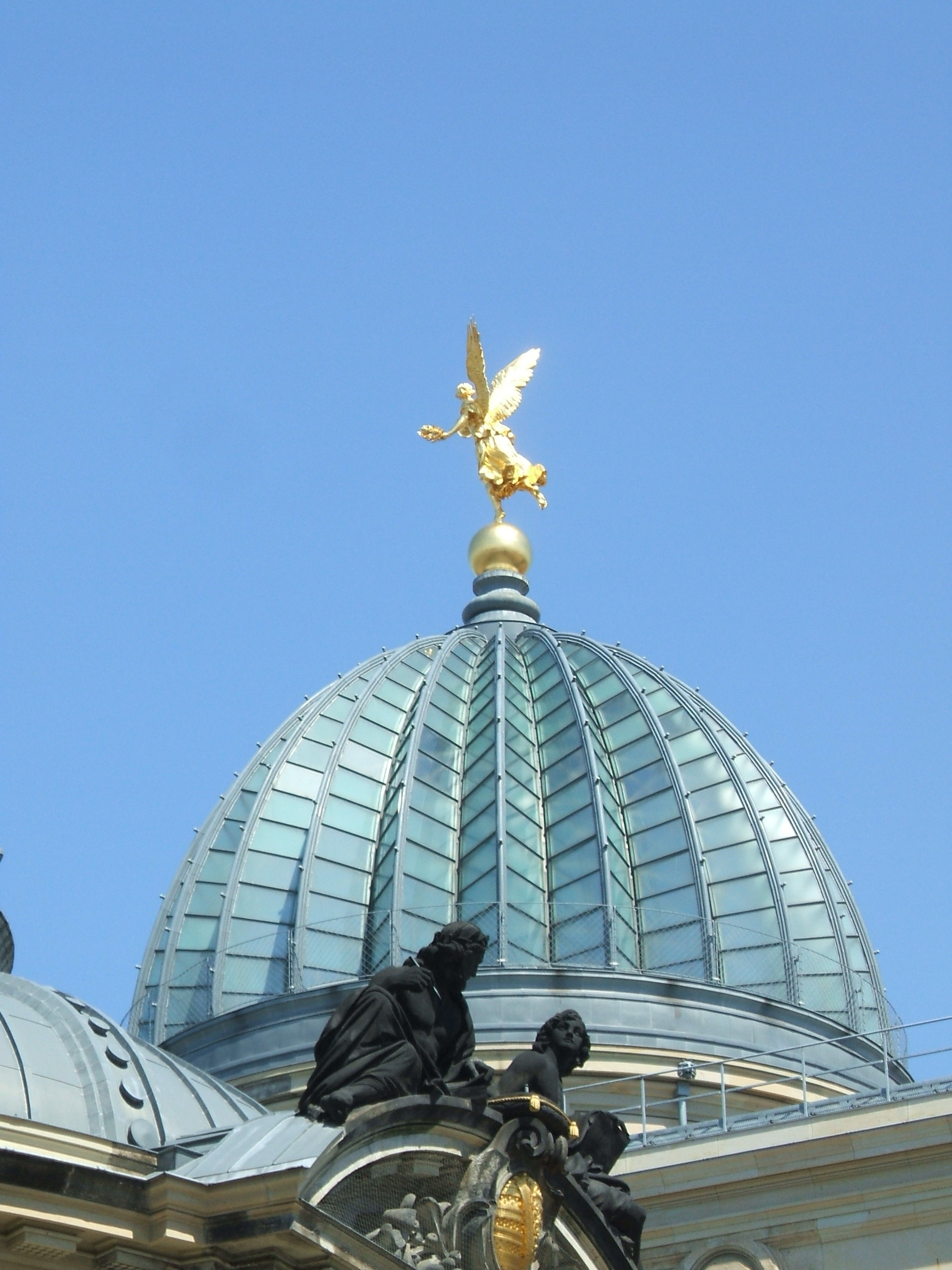
The glass dome of the main building - colloquially referred to as "Lemon Squeezer"

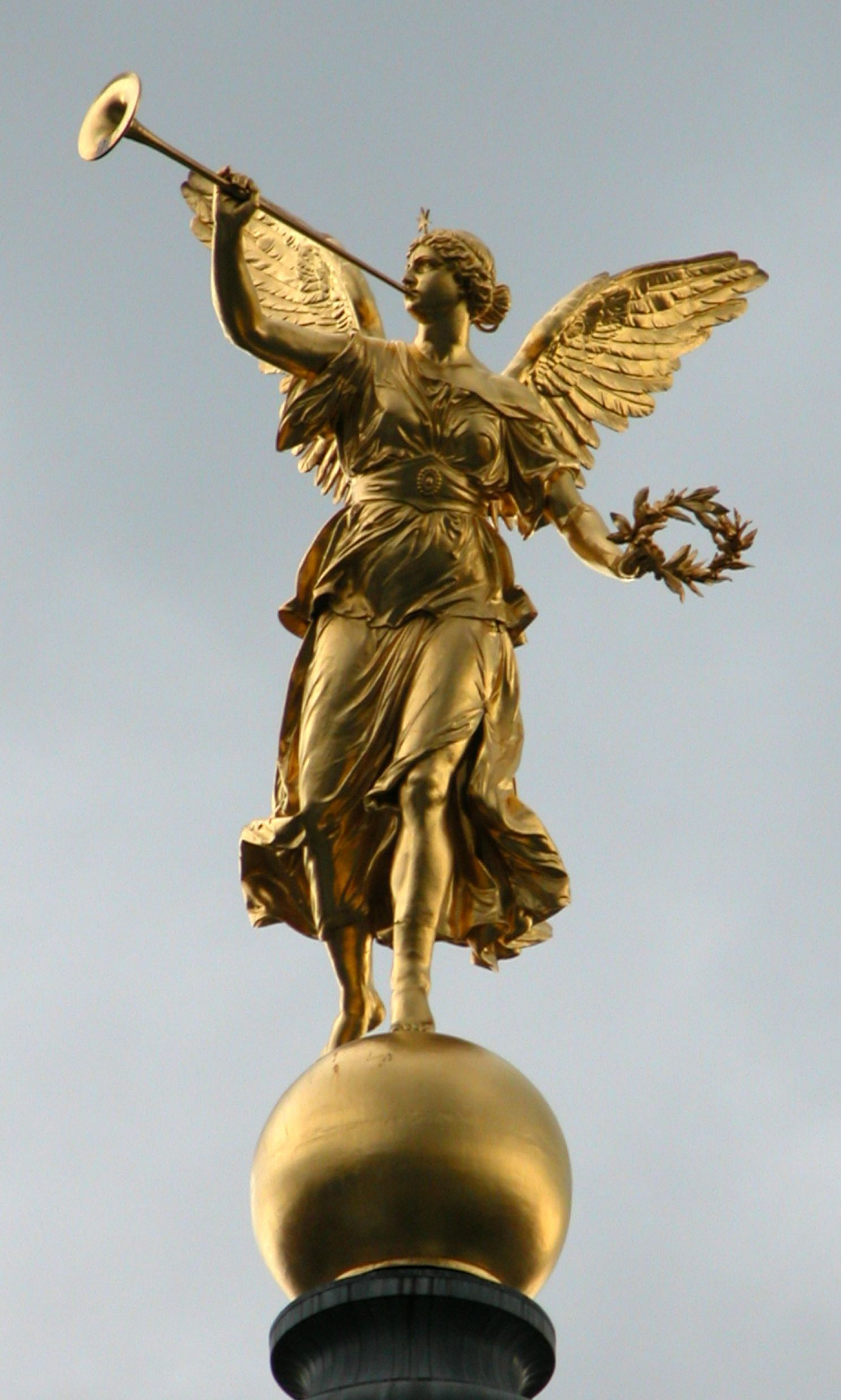
Pheme or Fama on top of the dome of the main building

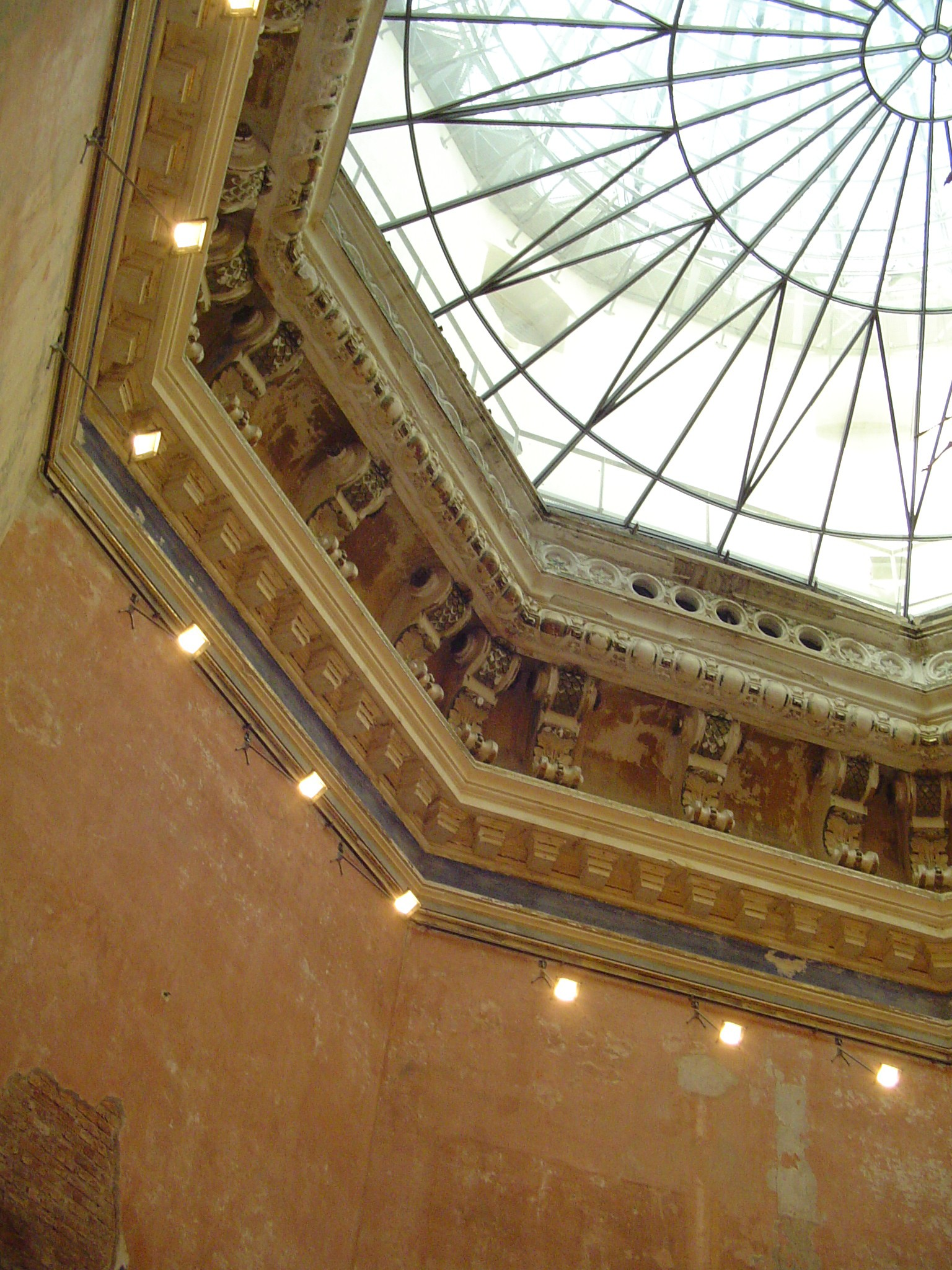
Interior view below the glass dome

One of three buildings of today’s Dresden Academy of Fine Arts, the former Royal Academy of Arts, built in 1894, is located at a prominent position in town on Brühl's Terrace just next to the Frauenkirche. Since 1991, the building built by Constantin Lipsius on Brühl's Terrace between 1887 and 1894 – the glass dome of which is also known as Lemon Squeezer due to its form – has been heavily renovated and the parts that were destroyed during World War II were reconstructed. The studios for painting/graphic arts/sculpture/other artistic media, the graphic workshops, the rector's office and the exhibition rooms of the Academy, which house the annual graduation exhibitions of the graduates, are located on Brühl's Terrace.

On the side of the building facing the Elbe, the names of Pheidias, Iktinos, Praxiteles, Polykleitos, Lysippos, Erwin von Steinbach, Leonardo da Vinci, Michelangelo, Raphael and Dürer are inscribed on the wall and on the other side the motto "DEM VATERLAND ZU ZIER UND EHR" - "For the Honour and Adornment of the Fatherland" - is inscribed.

Apart from this building, the Academy owns the building for sculpture in Pfotenhauerstrasse, the studios and workshops of which were built in a big open-air exhibition ground in 1910. The workshops and studios for the courses of study of restoration, stage setting and costume design and the technical college degree course for theatre setting and costume design are located at Güntzstrasse in the buildings of the former Academy of Applied Arts.

=== Institution ===
==== Predecessors ====
In 1764, the “Allgemeine Kunst-Academie der Malerey, Bildhauer-Kunst, Kupferstecher- und Baukunst” (General Academy of Arts for Painting, Sculpture, Copperplate Engraving and Architecture) was founded by order of the Prince-Elector Frederick Christian. From 1768 to 1786 it was located in the Fürstenberg Palace. Its first director was the Frenchmen Charles Hutin. After the death of Hutin in 1776, Johann Eleazar Zeissig, referred to as Schenau, became alternating director of the Academy together with Giovanni Battista Casanova.

The Academy was the successor institution of the first “Zeichen- und Malerschule” (School for Drawing and Painters) founded in 1680. It was one of the oldest academies of art in the German-speaking area. In 1950 the Akademie der Bildenden Künste Dresden (Dresden Academy of Fine Arts) was merged with the Staatliche Hochschule für Werkkunst (Public Academy of Applied Art) – the successor of the Königlich Sächsische Kunstgewerbeschule (Royal Saxon School of Applied Art)– into today's "Hochschule für Bildende Künste Dresden” (Dresden Academy of Fine Arts).

==== Features ====
The Academy is provided with presentation space in the octagon below the glass dome referred to as “Lemon Squeezer” that is a landmark in the town, and in the two big adjacent exhibition rooms as well as the former library and the “Galerie Brühlsche Terrasse” (Brühl’s Terrace Gallery) which may be used by students from all degree courses and co-operation partners of the Academy.

==== Degree courses ====
The degree course of Bildende Kunst (Fine Art) consists of 10 semesters and leads to the Diplom degree. The degree course Kunsttechnologie, Konservierung und Restaurierung von Kunst- und Kulturgut (Art Technology, Preservation and Restoration of Artistic and Cultural Assets) is one of the oldest courses on university level in Germany.

The Laboratory Theatre in the Güntzstrasse completed in April 2000 houses a rehearsal and experimental stage room.

== Notable alumni and former faculty ==
=== Former faculty members ===
One of its most illustrious teachers was Bernardo Bellotto, a painter of town scapes of Dresden. At the beginning of the 19th century, painters such as Anton Graff and Adrian Zingg made the Dresden Academy one of the most important art schools in Europe. The engraver Johann Friedrich Wilhem Müller, author of a famous engraving of the Sistine Madonna after Raphael, was a professor at the Akademie from 1814 to 1816. Ernst Rietschel, Gottfried Semper and Ludwig Richter consolidated the reputation of the academy, which experienced a further zenith around the turn of the century. Many other eminent artists and scholars closely associated with the history of the Academy include Eugen Bracht, Giovanni Casanova, Caspar David Friedrich, Oskar Kokoschka, and Otto Dix, who taught at the Dresden Academy and shaped its profile.

Other former artist professors are:

- Karl Albiker
- Johan Christian Dahl
- Constantin Lipsius
- Richard Müller
- Georg Hermann Nicolai
- Moritz Retzsch
- Paul Wallot

famous artist presidents:

- Johannes Heisig (1989–91)

=== Alumni ===
- Carl Gustav Carus, (1789–1869), German physiologist and painter
- Otto Dix (1891–1969), German painter and printmaker
- Conrad Felixmüller (1897–1977), German painter and printmaker
- Fedor Flinzer (1832–1911), German author, educator, and illustrator
- Hilde Goldschmidt (1897-1980), German painter and printmaker
- Tatyana Grosman (1904–1982), Russian American printmaker, and publisher
- George Grosz (1893–1959), German painter and caricaturist
- Eberhard Havekost (1967–2019), German painter and stonemason
- Friedrich Heyser (1857–1921), German painter
- Kurt Hilscher (1904–1980), German commercial illustrator
- Ludwig von Hofmann (1861–1945), German painter, graphic artist and designer
- Wilhelm von Kügelgen (1802–1867), German painter and writer
- Elfriede Lohse-Wächtler (1899–1940), German painter and graphic artist
- Alfred Mailick (1869–1946), landscape painter
- Yana Milev (born 1969), German philosopher, sociologist, and ethnographer
- Otto Mueller (1874–1930), German painter and printmaker
- Rolf Nesch (1893–1975), Norwegian printmaker, painter and sculptor
- Bencho Obreshkov (1899–1970), Bulgarian painter
- Julius Platzmann (1832-1902), German botanist, artist and bibliophile
- Hermann Prell (1854–1922), German history painter and sculptor
- Sandra Rauch (born 1967), German artist
- Thomas Reichstein (born 1960), German sculptor
- Adrian Ludwig Richter (1803–1884), German painter and etcher
- Gerhard Richter (born 1932), German painter and photographer
- Osmar Schindler (1869–1927), German painter
- Cornelia Schleime (born 1953), German painter, performer, filmmaker and author
- Sascha Schneider (1870–1927), German painter and sculptor
- Kurt Schwitters, (1887–1948) German painter
- Lasar Segall (1891–1957), Brazilian painter, engraver and sculptor
- Karl August Senff (1770–1838), Baltic German painter, engraver and art teacher
- Hans Unger (1872–1936), German painter
- Otto Kaule (1870–1948), German painter

== Locations ==
The Dresden Academy of Fine Arts is located at three places along the Elbe river:

- Brühlsche Terrasse 1, Dresden-Altstadt
- Güntzstraße 34, Dresden
- Pfotenhauerstrasse 81/83, Dresden-Johannstadt

Each year in early June the graduation ceremonies and annual exhibitions are held at the locations on the Brühl Terrace and at Pfotenhauerstrasse.

== See also ==
- List of universities in Germany
