= Conrad Felixmüller =

German expressionist painter and printmaker

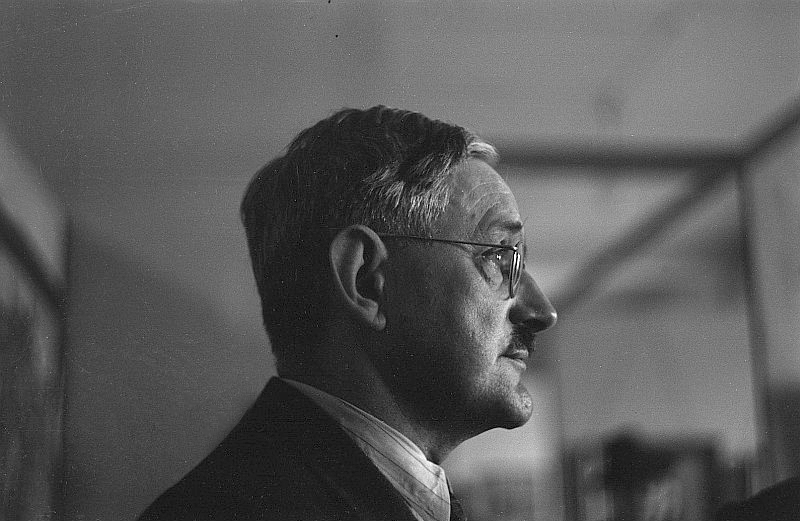
- Born: Conrad Felix Müller; 21 May 1897; Dresden, German Empire
- Died: 24 March 1977 (aged 79); Zehlendorf, West Berlin, West Germany
- Education: Dresden Academy of Art
- Style: Expressionism
- Movement: New Objectivity

Conrad Felixmüller (21 May 1897 – 24 March 1977) was a German Expressionist painter and printmaker. Born in Dresden as Conrad Felix Müller, he chose Felixmüller as his nom d'artiste.

== Early life and career ==
A soldier in a lunatic asylum. Lithograph by Conrad Felixmüller, 1918.

He attended drawing classes at the Dresden School of Arts and Crafts in 1911–12 before studying under Carl Bantzer at the Dresden Academy of Fine Arts. In 1917 he performed military service as a medical orderly, and became a founding member of the Dresden Expressionist group Expressionistische Arbeitsgemeinschaft Dresden. He achieved his earliest success as a printmaker. Felixmüller was a member of the Communist Party of Germany from 1918 to 1922. He published many woodcuts and drawings in left-wing magazines, and remained a prolific printmaker throughout his career. He was a close friend of the composer Clemens Braun of whom he produced a number of portraits and a woodcut depicting him on his deathbed. Another subject of Felixmüller's was his friend and German expressionist poet Walter Rheiner. Felixmüller had done illustrations for many of Rheiner's works. In tribute following the news of Rheiner's death, Felixmüller's painting 'Der Tod des Dichters Walter Rheiner'pays homage to his deceased friend.

Felixmüller was one of the youngest members of the New Objectivity movement. His paintings often deal with the social realities of Germany's Weimar Republic. He was mentor to the German Expressionist Otto Dix.

Felixmüller's work became more objective and restrained after the mid-1920s. He wrote in 1929:

It has become increasingly clear to me that the only necessary goal is to depict the direct, simple life which one has lived oneself, also involving the design of colour as painting—in the manner in which it was cultivated by the Old Masters for centuries, until Impressionism and Expressionism, infected by the technical and industrial delusions of grandeur, rejected every affinity for tradition, ability and results, committing harakiri.

In the 1930s, many of his works were seized as degenerate art by the Nazis, and destroyed. In 1944, his studio in Berlin was bombed, resulting in more losses of his works. From 1949 to 1962 Felixmüller taught at the University of Halle. He died in the Berlin suburb of Zehlendorf.

His 1924 watercolour Couple in a Landscape was found as part of the Munich Art Hoard.

== See also ==
- List of German painters
