= Käthe Kollwitz Prize =

German art award

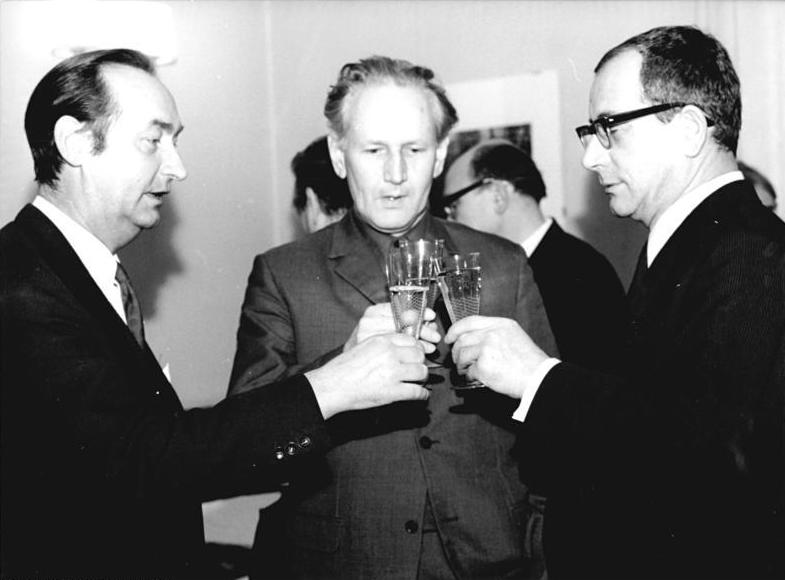
Käthe Kollwitz Prize winner Willi Sitte (right), toasts with Werner Klemke (left), and Kurt Schwaen (centre) in 1968.

The Käthe Kollwitz Prize (German: Käthe-Kollwitz-Preis) is a German art award named after artist Käthe Kollwitz.

Established in 1960 by the then-Academy of Arts of the German Democratic Republic (nowadays the Academy of Arts, Berlin), the prize is awarded annually by a jury whose members are newly chosen each year to a visual artist living and working in Germany who is honored either for a single work or their complete body of work. Since 1992, the prize money (12,000 euros as of 2009) has been co-funded by the Kreissparkasse Cologne, the owner of the Käthe Kollwitz Museum in Cologne. The Academy organises a parallel exhibition, accompanied by a catalog, for the laureate.

== Previous winners ==
- 1960: Karl Erich Müller
- 1961: Arno Mohr
- 1962: Sella Hasse
- 1964: Herbert Tucholski
- 1965: Fritz Duda
- 1966: Fritz Dähn
- 1967: Otto Nagel
- 1968: Willi Sitte
- 1969: Theo Balden
- 1970: Gerhard Kettner
- 1971: Curt Querner
- 1972: Herbert Sandberg
- 1973: René Graetz
- 1974: Wieland Förster
- 1975: Werner Stötzer
- 1976: Harald Metzkes
- 1977: Horst Zickelbein
- 1978: Dieter Goltzsche
- 1979: Wilfried Fitzenreiter
- 1980: Werner Tübke
- 1981: Elizabeth Shaw
- 1982: Hans Vent
- 1983: Sabina Grzimek
- 1984: Manfred Böttcher
- 1985: Joachim John
- 1986: Gerhard Goßmann
- 1987: Max Uhlig
- 1988: Christa Sammler
- 1989: Claus Weidensdorfer
- 1990: Konrad Knebel
- 1991: Manfred Butzmann
- 1992: Lothar Böhme
- 1993: Martin Assig
- 1994: Karla Woisnitza
- 1995: Micha Ullman
- 1996: Martin Kippenberger
- 1997: Astrid Klein
- 1998: Miriam Cahn
- 1999: Mark Lammert
- 2000: Svetlana Kopystiansky
- 2001: Jürgen Schön
- 2002: Renate Anger
- 2003: Horst Münch
- 2004: Peter Weibel
- 2005: Lutz Dammbeck
- 2006: Thomas Eller
- 2007: Hede Bühl
- 2008: Gustav Kluge
- 2009: Ulrike Grossarth
- 2010: Mona Hatoum
- 2011: Janet Cardiff, George Bures Miller
- 2012: Douglas Gordon
- 2013: Eran Schaerf
- 2014: Corinne Wasmuht
- 2015: Bernard Frize
- 2016: Edmund Kuppel
- 2017: Katharina Sieverding
- 2018: Adrian Piper
- 2019: Hito Steyerl
- 2020: Timm Ulrichs
- 2021: Maria Eichhorn
- 2022: Nan Goldin
- 2023: Sandra Vásquez de la Horra
- 2024: Candida Höfer

== See also ==
- List of European art awards
