= Ulenspiegel (magazine) =

German magazine

- First issue of Ulenspiegel
- Categories: Satire
- Frequency: Bi-weekly
- Publisher: Herbert Sandberg, Günther Weisenborn
- Founded: 1945
- First issue: 24 December 1945
- Final issue: August 1950
- Company: Ulenspiegel-Verlag
- Country: Germany
- Based in: Berlin
- Language: German

Ulenspiegel was a bi-weekly German satirical magazine published in Berlin after World War II. The magazine was an important cultural outlet in the new era of democracy and freedom following the fall of the Third Reich. Its first issue was published on 24 December 1945. The publishers were Herbert Sandberg and Günther Weisenborn; editors included Wolfgang Weyrauch, with Karl Schnog becoming editor-in-chief in 1947. Its success was stymied by politics, as the editors first clashed with the American authorities in occupied Germany in 1948, accused of being too "left-wing", and then after the magazine moved to the Soviet sector of Berlin, ran afoul of the Communists in 1950. The remaining publisher, Sandberg, lost his license to publish in 1950.

== Satirical name ==
Ulenspiegel was a leftist-oriented political satire magazine in the tradition of Simplicissimus and other classic humor and satire publications and was a precursor of later magazines, such as Pardon, Titanic, and Eulenspiegel. (Note: The first magazine called Ulenspiegel was unrelated to the postwar satirical journal; it was the in-house magazine of the German publishing house Ullstein Verlag, published from 1934 to 1941.) Called "one of the most important satirical journals of the postwar period", it was named after Till Eulenspiegel, a popular jester and hero from German folklore. His name is both innocuous and indicative of his character. In High German, Eulenspiegel means "owl mirror", but he respected no authority and played practical jokes, thus acting out the Plattdeutsch version of his name: ulen, "to sweep" or "clean", and Spiegel, which is hunter's jargon for "hind parts" or "backside", so that in the original Plattdeutsch, his surname means "wipe my ass", in essence, "kiss my ass".

During the postwar period, a number of Kabaretts opened in Germany, including the important Cabaret Ulenspiegel during 1946 in what later became West Berlin.

== History ==
=== Foundation ===
In June 1945, Herbert Sandberg, newly liberated from Buchenwald concentration camp, and playwright and literary critic Günter Weisenborn, newly freed from Zuchthaus Luckau, met on the Kurfürstendamm. Sandberg had a finished comp of a satirical magazine with him. Emil Carlebach, who had been Sandberg's Blockältester at Buchenwald and had been granted a license as editor for the Frankfurter Rundschau introduced Sandberg to officials at the Information Control Division (ICD). Peter de Mendelssohn, who was responsible for establishing the first American sector newspaper, at the Office of Military Government, United States (OMGUS), and Carlebach acted as founding sponsors. The publishing information from a 1946 masthead makes the intent and purpose clear: "The independent and uncensored Ulenspiegel is published every other Friday by Ulenspiegel Verlag Haueisen & Co. G.m.b.H. Berlin-Dahlem Pücklerstr. 22... The Ulenspiegel Verlag is accredited by the Information Control Division of the American Military Government."

Sandberg and Weisenborn became the publishers. Wolfgang Weyrauch became an editor in 1945 or 1946. Karl Schnog became editor-in-chief in 1947.

=== Postwar freedom ===
In the early days of the postwar era, Ulenspiegel was a forum for writers, illustrators, caricaturists, and graphic artists of various cultural and political orientation, where they could freely satirize, comment on, and join in the political, cultural, and economic development of Germany. For example, Weisenborn was a member of the Social Democratic Party and Sandberg, a Communist. In their journal, satire, humor, cartoons, and caricature played a special role, with artwork by Alfred Kubin, Karl Hofer, and Max Pechstein among others. They also supported the re-discovery of avant-garde artists, who had been ostracized, their work smeared as degenerate, reproducing works by Pablo Picasso, Marc Chagall, and other artists, both past and contemporary, who had been banned under the Third Reich.

Ulenspiegel took a strong anti-Nazi position, portraying Nazi concentration camps and crimes in its artwork, and declaring the complicity of the German people. By 1948, however, with the United States and the Soviet Union becoming more antagonistic, the journal began to portray them as two giants battling for domination of Germany and the world. It described denazification as a half-hearted, failed exercise, and mockingly criticized the German-American partnership as an unequal and unholy alliance between ex-Nazis and dollar-wielding Americans. Many of Ulenspiegel's contributors influenced the cultural face of both East and West Germany.

=== Cold War and closure ===
From the early postwar days until the Cold War and division of Germany, the editorial meetings of the satirical magazine brought together those who had survived Nazi Germany. Artists, writers, exiles, editors, and graphic designers met and had heated discussions about the present and future of Germany. The publishers were able to help some people acquire a Persilschein. This was the denazification certificate one needed to receive a work permit.

In October 1947, OMGUS began to directly counter Soviet propaganda with its "Operation Talk Back", using the mass media to relay its message and bringing Ulenspiegel into direct conflict with the Americans over its criticism of their policies in Germany. In an attempt to censor and punish Ulenspiegel for its editorial positions, OMGUS cut the magazine's paper allotment by one-half and began to look for new editors. An internal ICD memo clearly delineates the motive. "Orders have been issued to reduce by one-half the paper allocation given to the magazine Ulenspiegel as a preliminary step toward inducing a change in editorial orientation of this magazine or its replacement with a more effective medium." The result was a significant drop in circulation. When Ulenspiegel first began publishing, circulation was 120,000; later it dropped to 50,000, although it later recovered somewhat to 75,000. From 24 December 1945, to the tenth 1948 issue, the magazine appeared under license by the American military; from April 1948 to 1950, it was under license by the Soviet occupational force.

In July 1948, Weisenborn left Ulenspiegel and Berlin, moving to Hamburg. The Cold War was intensifying; the Americans had instituted a currency reform and the Berlin Blockade was on. Sandberg returned his license to the Americans, accepted an offer from the Soviet Military Administration in Germany, and moved to East Berlin in 1948.

Fuffzehn für Vergnügte und Verärgerte, edited by Lothar Kusche was also a satirical weekly magazine briefly published by Ulenspiegel Verlag in 1949. Just 20 issues were printed. The company also published a few books.

Ulenspiegel continued to appear, censored by the Soviets, until August 1950, when its publishing license was rescinded for being too modern and "lacking a basis in the Masses". A competitor in the Soviet sector, the magazine Frischer Wind, licensed to publish in 1947, "better understood that the Party [was] always right—and [had] no sense of humor". Renamed Eulenspiegel in 1954, it continues to publish today in Berlin.

== Ulenspiegel's contributors ==
The contributors included:

- Bele Bachem
- Johannes R. Becher
- Wolfgang Borchert
- Bertolt Brecht
- Alexander Camaro
- Otto Dix
- Richard Drews
- Alfred Döblin
- Jean Effel
- Heinrich Ehmsen
- René Graetz
- George Grosz
- John Heartfield
- Hannes Hegen
- Josef Hegenbarth
- Robert Herlth
- Stephan Hermlin
- Hermann Hesse
- Karl Hofer
- Karl Holtz
- Hannah Höch
- Heinrich Kilger
- Werner Klemke
- Käthe Kollwitz
- Alfred Kubin
- Günter Kunert
- Lothar Kusche
- Erich Kästner
- Max Lingner
- Jeanne Mammen
- Frans Masereel
- Arno Mohr
- Henry Moore
- Oskar Nerlinger
- Boris Pasternak
- Max Pechstein
- Christa Reinig
- Paul Rosié
- Jean-Paul Sartre
- Albert Schaefer-Ast
- Rudolf Schlichter
- Robert Wolfgang Schnell
- Anna Seghers
- Elizabeth Shaw
- Paul Strecker
- Günther Strupp
- Georg Tappert
- Walter Trier
- Kurt Tucholsky
- Berthold Viertel
- Wolfgang Weyrauch
- Günther Weisenborn
- Friedrich Wolf
- Carl Zuckmayer

== See also ==
- List of magazines in Germany

== Sources ==
- Ulenspiegel / Literatur – Kunst – Satire. Herbert Sandberg and Günther Weisenborn, Ulenspiegelverlag Berlin (1946–1950)
- Ulenspiegel-Kalender, Ulenspiegel Verlag, Berlin (1950)
- Fuffzehn für Vergnügte und Verärgerte. Lothar Kusche (Ed). Ulenspiegel-Verlag, Berlin (1949), 1-20
- Herbert Sandberg, Günter Kunert, Ulenspiegel – Zeitschrift für Literatur, Kunst und Satire. Eine Auswahl 1945–1950. Eulenspiegel-Verlag, Berlin, Carl Hanser, Munich (1978). 256 pages. ISBN 3-446-12749-6
- Herbert Sandberg, "Ulenspiegel. Satire – Kunst. Deutschland vor der Teilung". Stiftung Ludwig Institut Schloß Oberhausen. Exhibition catalogue, Oberhausen o.J (1994), 158 pages
- Karl Ludwig Hofmann, Christmut Präger: Ulenspiegel, Wespennest und Simpl. Drei Satirische Zeitschriften der Nachkriegszeit. In: Krieg und Frieden. Frankfurter Kunstverein. Elefanten Press, Berlin (1980)
