= Günther Weisenborn =

German writer, dramaturge and playwright (1902–1969)

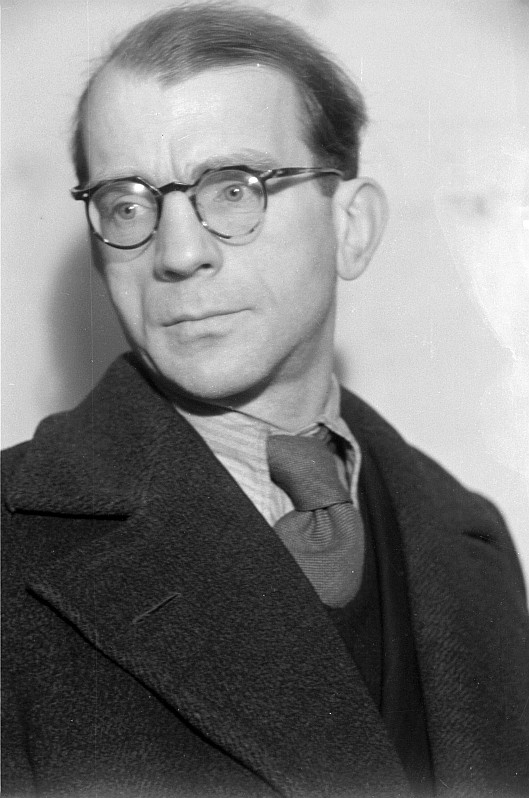
Portrait of Weisenborn, 1946

Günther Weisenborn (10 July 1902 – 26 March 1969) was a German writer and fighter in the German Resistance against Nazism. He was notable for collaborating with Bertolt Brecht, along with Hanns Eisler, Slatan Dudow, on the play, The Mother. However, in 1933, when the work fell out of favour by the Nazis after being blacklisted by Joseph Goebbels, he emigrated to Argentina. When he returned in 1937, be became a member of a Berlin-based resistance group that was later renamed to the Red Orchestra ("Rote Kapelle") by the Abwehr. Arrested in 1942 and sentenced to several years in prison, he was released in 1945 by Soviet troops.

== Life and work ==
Weisenborn was born in Velbert and grew up in Opladen. In the early 1920s, he worked freelance for the local newspaper, the Opladener Zeitung. He attended the Universities of Cologne, Bonn and Berlin, studying German studies and medicine. On finishing his education, he began acting in local theaters in 1927 and in 1928, became a dramaturge at the Berlin Volksbühne, where his anti-war play, U-Boot S4 was premiered on 16 October 1928, directed by Leo Reuß. With Robert Adolf Stemmle, he co-wrote the lyrics to Mann im Beton ("Man in Concrete"), the proletarian ballad by Walter Gronostay.

=== Resistance and prison ===
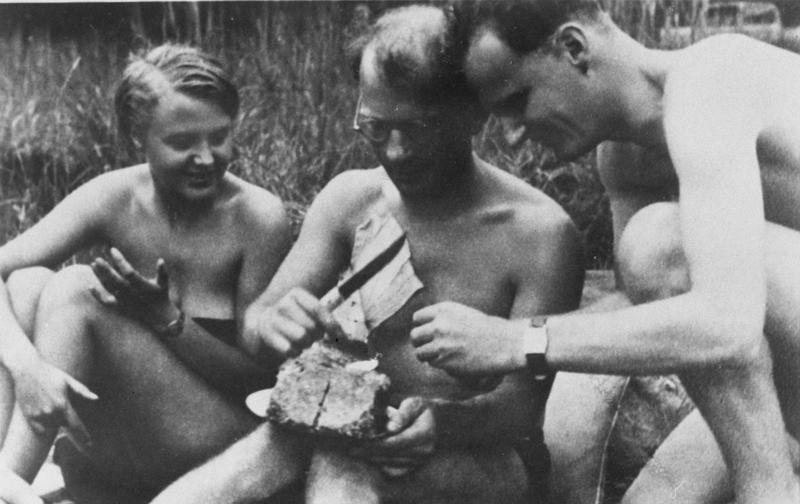
Günther Weisenborn (c.) with Harro Schulze-Boysen and Marta Husemann

After the Nazis seized power, Weisenborn's books were banned, but he continued writing using the pseudonyms "W. Bohr", "Christian Munk" and "Eberhard Förster"). He emigrated to the U.S. in 1936, but returned to Germany in 1937 and began leading a double life, working with the Nazi cultural establishment, while he worked with the Resistance group, the Red Orchestra.

In 1941, he began working as dramaturge at the Schiller Theater and he was married to Margarete "Joy" Schnabel (1914–2004), whom he met in 1939, .when she was living with Libertas and Harro Schulze-Boysen. According to Weisenborn, the Berlin-based Red Orchestra ("Rote Kapelle") had two-hundred and eighty-three members.

He was arrested in September 1942 and brought before the Reichskriegsgericht, the Reich's wartime high court that tried both the military and civilians. Weisenborn was charged with high treason and sentenced to death. He later wrote that he didn't see his lawyer until they were in court. The lawyer said to him, "I'm your official defender, I know your files. Don't worry unnecessarily. You know that the worst that can happen is the death sentence. We'll see each other later."

The exculpatory testimony of a cellmate led to a reduction in sentence from death to 10 years Zuchthaus. He was liberated by the Red Army from the Zuchthaus (labor prison) in Luckau in April 1945. (Note: Further details about Weisenborn's incarceration can be found in the permanent exhibition of the Topography of Terror, a museum and memorial on the site where the Gestapo and SS headquarters once were.) From 1942 to 1943, Weisenborn was imprisoned at Gestapo headquarters in Berlin-Kreuzberg before he was sent to prison in Luckau. Weisenborn's short story, Die Aussage is dedicated to his experiences there, awaiting execution.

=== Postwar years ===
After being released in April 1945, Weisenborn briefly served as acting mayor of Langengrassau, near Luckau. He then returned to West Berlin and founded the Hebbel Theater with Karlheinz Martin. From 1945 until the end of 1947, he was also co-publisher and editor of the satirical magazine, Ulenspiegel, along with Herbert Sandberg, who directed the art. Weisenborn also co-founded Studio 46, which premiered his play, Die Illegalen, a drama about his experiences in the German Resistance.

In addition, in 1947, Weisenborn, Adolf Grimme and Greta Kuckhoff filed a lawsuit against the chief prosecutor of the Red Orchestra, Manfred Roeder. The state's attorney in Lüneburg delayed the trial until the end of the 1960s, when it was dropped.

From 1951 to 1953, Weisenborn was chief dramaturge at the Hamburg Kammerspiele. In 1953, he published his book, Der lautlose Aufstand (The Silent Rebellion), the first comprehensive report documenting the German Resistance. Lecture tours took him to Asia (Burma, the People's Republic of China, India and the Soviet Union), as well as to London, Paris, Prague and Warsaw. Weisenborn became ever more involved as a pacifist against rearming West Germany and warned of the atomic threat it posed. In 1955, he wrote the screenplay for Falk Harnack's film, Der 20. Juli (The Plot to Assassinate Hitler), for which he received the German Film Prize in silver.

In 1955, Weisenborn also created the "Silver Leaf", one of the two prizes awarded by the Dramatiker Union. Given exclusively to non-members, the honorary award is bestowed on individuals who have especially supported and nurtured contemporary dramatic works.

His later film work included documentaries about the German Resistance to the Third Reich and the screenplay for Bertolt Brecht's Three Penny Opera. Weisenborn moved to West Berlin in 1964.

== Awards and recognition ==
Weisenborn was chairman of the Schutzverbandes deutscher Autoren ("Association of German Authors"), a member of the Free Academy of the Arts in Hamburg, the German Academy of the Performing Arts, then with offices in Frankfurt am Main, corresponding member of the Akademie der Künste in Berlin, then located in East Berlin, the P.E.N. Club, Germany and the European writers' society, "Comes". He received the prize from the Académie des Hespérides.

The city of his birth, Velbert has a street named for him, as does Leverkusen.

== Works ==
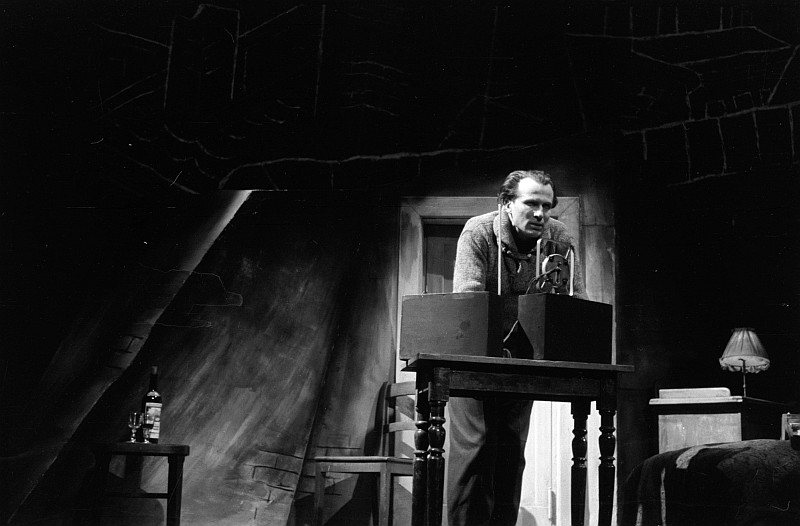
Die Illegalen premiered on March 21, 1946, at Berlin's Hebbel Theater. (Pictured: Ernst Wilhelm Borchert)

- U-Boot S4, drama (1928)
- Barbaren, novel (1931)
- Die Neuberin, play (1934), with Eberhard Keindorff
- Das Mädchen von Fanö, novel (1935); film (1941)
- Die Furie, novel (1937)
- Ahnung, poem (1942), written in Zuchthaus Moabit
- Die Illegalen, drama from and about the German Resistance (1946)
- Die Aussage, short story (1947)
- Vorrede für die Nachgeborenen (1947)
- Memorial, autobiography (1948)
- Zwei Männer (1949, published in Tausend Gramm, edited by Wolfgang Weyrauch
- Drei ehrenwerte Herren (1951)
- Der lautlose Aufstand (1953), about the German Resistance, based on materials collected by Ricarda Huch; second duplicated and expanded edition (1954); French edition: Une Allemagne contre Hitler (2000)
- Der dritte Blick (1956)
- Der Verfolger (1961)
- Am Yangtse steht ein Riese auf. Notizbuch aus China (1961)
- Der gespaltene Horizont. Niederschriften eines Außenseiters (1965)
- Ein gleichgültiger Mittwoch (1967)
- Wenn wir endlich frei sind: Briefe, Lieder, Kassiber 1942–1943, written with his wife, Joy Weisenborn (2008)

== Sources ==
- Manfred Demmer: Spurensuche: Der antifaschistische Schriftsteller Günther Weisenborn. Kulturvereinigung Leverkusen e.V.: Leverkusen (2004) (in German)
- Roswita Schwarz: Vom expressionistischen Aufbruch zur inneren Emigration. Günther Weisenborns weltanschauliche und künstlerische Entwicklung in der Weimarer Republik und im 3. Reich. Lang: Frankfurt am Main (1995) ISBN 3-631-47889-5 (in German)
- Hans Coppi, Jr., Jürgen Danyel, Johannes Tuchel: Die Rote Kapelle im Widerstand gegen Hitler. Writings of the Memorial to the German Resistance. Edition Hentrich: Berlin (1994) ISBN 3-89468-110-1 (in German)
- Gert Rosiejka: Die Rote Kapelle. „Landesverrat“ als antifaschistischer Widerstand. Ergebnisse-Verlag: Hamburg (1986) ISBN 3-925622-16-0 (in German)
