= Weyrauch =

Weyrauch is a German surname. The name is sometimes spelled Weirauch. Notable people with the surname include:

- Erwin Antonín Weyrauch (1803–1865), Bohemian writer and priest of Premonstratensian Order
- Jakob Johann von Weyrauch (1845–1917), German mathematician and engineer
- Johannes Weyrauch (1897–1977), German composer
- Wolfgang Weyrauch (1904–1980), German writer
- Wolfgang Karl Weyrauch (1907–1970), German-Peruvian zoologist
