= Karl Holz =

Karl Holz may refer to:

- Karl Holz (Nazi) (1895–1945), Nazi Party leader of Gau Franconia and an SA Gruppenführer
- Karl Holz (violinist) (1798–1858), Austrian violinist in the Schuppanzigh Quartet
- Karl Holz (executive), former president of Disney Cruise Line

== See also ==
- Karl Holtz (1899–1978), German artist and cartoonist
