= Emil Schumacher =

German painter

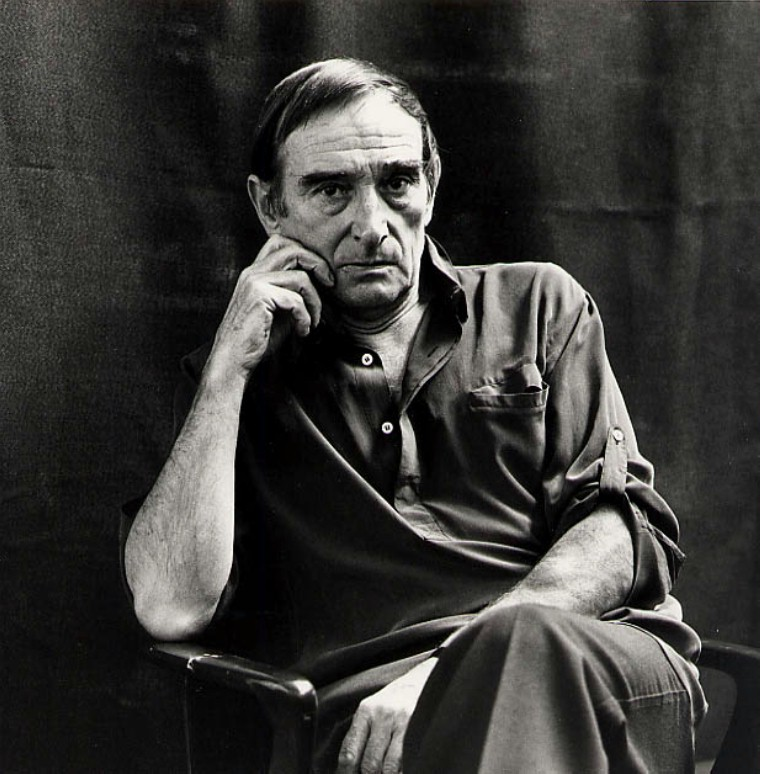
- Emil Schumacher, 1981
- Born: 29 August 1912; Hagen, Germany
- Died: 4 October 1999 (aged 87); San José, Spain
- Education: School of Applied Arts in Dortmund, Germany
- Known for: Painting
- Notable work: Eruption (1956); B-1 (1969); Mit Holz, (1980); Falacca, (1989); Subito, (1998)
- Awards: Guggenheim Award (National Section)

Emil Schumacher (29 August 1912 in Hagen, Westfalen – 4 October 1999 in San José, Ibiza) was a German painter. He was an important representative of abstract expressionism in post-war Germany.

In 2009 the Kunstquartier Hagen was inaugurated combining the Karl Ernst Osthaus-Museum Hagen as well as the newly built Emil Schumacher Museum in one Museum complex.

== Early life ==
Born on 29 August in Hagen, Germany, as the third child of Anna and Emil Schumacher. Enrolled in the secondary school in Hagen, Germany. As an 18-year-old, Emil Schumacher undertakes a four-week-long bicycle tour to Paris, France.

== Career ==
1932–1935: Studies graphic design at the School of Applied Arts in Dortmund intending to become a graphic designer in advertising. On numerous occasions during his studies, he travels abroad by bicycle. One trip takes him over the St. Gotthard Pass to Lago Maggiore, Italy.

1935–1939: Independent artist without participating in exhibits. He undertakes study trips by bicycle to the Netherlands and Belgium.

1947: First solo exhibit in the Studio für neue Kunst. Co-founder of the artist group Junger Westen.

1954: Participates in the Willem Sandberg exhibition Deutsche Kunst nach 45 (German Art after 1945) at the Stedelijk Museum Amsterdam: for the first time after World War II, Contemporary German Art is shown abroad.

1955: Participates in the exhibition Peintures et sculptures non-figuratives en Allemagne d’aujourd’hui in Paris. This is the first time, 10 years after the war's end, that René Drouin shows contemporary German art at the Cercle Volney in France.

1956: While searching for new media and materials, Schumacher creates his first 'Tastobjekte' (tactile objects). Conrad von Soest Preis (Conrad-von-Soest Award), Münster, Germany.

1958: Travels to Spain, Italy and Tunisia. Participates in the XXIX. Venice Biennale, Italy.

1958–1960: Professorship at the Hochschule für bildende Künste Hamburg (University of Fine Arts) in Hamburg, Germany.

1959: Participates in the documenta II in Kassel, Germany, as well as the V. São Paulo Art Biennial, Brazil. First solo exhibit in New York at the Samuel M. Kootz Gallery.

1962: Travels to Libya and Tunisia. Summer stay in Anguillara, Lago di Bracciano, Italy.

1963: Solo exhibit as German contribution to the VII. São Paulo Art Biennial, Brazil. Travels to Brazil, Argentina, Uruguay, Peru and Bolivia. Once again summer stay in Anguillara, paintings that originated during the stay are shown in the Galeria La Medusa in Rome.

1964: Participates in the documenta III in Kassel, Germany.

1965: Travels through Yugoslavia, to Montenegro, the Herzegovina, and Bosnia.

1966–77: Professorship at the Academy of Fine Arts, Karlsruhe.

1967–68: Guest professorship at the Minneapolis School of Art, Minneapolis, USA. In Minneapolis, a series of works on paper are created. This series called Minneapolis Suite was exhibited at the Lefebre Gallery in New York and at the Galerie de Montréal in Montréal, Canada. Extensive travels through the USA.

1969: Winter stay on the Island of Djerba in Tunisia. Here, the Djerba gouaches were created over the course of the following years.

1971: Since 1971, frequent stays on Ibiza during spring and summer.

1974: Autumn stay in Cunardo, Lago Maggiore where the first ceramics are created in Ceramica Ibis.

1975: Winter stay on Djerba, Tunisia.

1980: Travels through Tunisia and winter stay in Hammamet.

1983: Travels to Marocco where Suite Maroc, encompassing 36 pages, is created.

1985: Guest of Honor of the German Academy of Rome, Villa Massimo, Italy.

1988: In October 1988, a 10-day stay in Irak. Design and creation of a 20 m-long (66 ft) ceramic wall in the new building of the Landtag of North Rhine-Westphalia.

1991: Guest professorship at the Concorso Superiore Internazionale del Disegno of the Fondazione Antonio Ratti, Como, Italy.

1996: Schumacher designs a 20 m-long (66 ft) and 3 m-high (9.8 ft) mosaic wall for the Colosseo (Rome Metro) in Rome, Italy.

1998: Commission for mural in the Reichstag building, Berlin (executed in 1999).

1999: Member of the Academy of the Arts of Saxony (Sächsische Akademie der Künste), Dresden, Germany. Publication of the book 'GENESIS' with 18 Serigraphies in the edition Har-El, Jaffa/Israel.

== Awards ==
1948: Kunstpreis junger westen from the city of Recklinghausen, Germany.

1955 Art award from the city of Iserlohn, Germany.

1958: Karl Ernst Osthaus Preis (Karl-Ernst-Osthaus Award), Hagen, Germany.

1958: Guggenheim Award (National Section), New York.

1959: Award from the Japanese Cultural Minister in celebration of the V. International Art Exhibition, Tokyo.

1962: Premio Cardazzo in celebration of the XXX. Venice Biennale, Italy.

1962: First prize silver medal, Bang Danh-Du Award in celebration of the 1st International Arts Exhibition, Saigon, Vietnam.

1963: Großer Kunstpreis (Great Art Award) of North Rhine-Westphalia, Düsseldorf, Germany.

1965: Second Prize, VI. Exposition Internationale de Gravure, Ljubljana.

1966: Prize of the Governor of Tokyo, in celebration of the 5th International Biennale Exhibition of Prints, Tokyo, Japan.

1968: Receives First Class Cross of Merit from the Order of Merit of the Federal Republic of Germany.

1968: Member of the Academy of Arts Berlin, Germany.

1974: Award of the city of Ibiza in celebration of the Graphic-Biennial 1974.

1978: August Macke Prize of the city of Meschede, Germany.

1982: Member of the Order of Merit (Pour le Mérite) of Sciences and the Arts.

1982: Rubenspreis (Rubens Award) from the city of Siegen, Ring of Honor from the city of Hagen, both Germany.

1983: Receives Grand Cross of Merit with Star from the Order of Merit of the Federal Republic of Germany.

1987: Jerg-Ratgeb-Preis (Jörg-Ratgeb-Award) of the city of Reutlingen, Germany.

1987: Award of the European Academy of Fine Arts, Trier, Germany.

1987: Order of Merit of North Rhine-Westphalia, Germany.

1988: Silver Medal in celebration of the 2. International Biennial in Bagdad, Irak.

1988: Honorary citizenship of the city of Hagen.

1990: Herbert-Boeckl-Award for Modern European Painting.

1990: First Prize of the 1. Biennale Européenne de l’estampe contemporaine Diekirch, Luxembourg.

1991: Grand prix d’honneur, Gold medal in celebration of the XIX. Biennale Internationale de Gravure, Ljubljana.

1991: Harry-Graf-Keßler Award from the Association of German Artists.

1992: Schumacher is awarded an honorary doctorate by the Technical University of Dortmund, Germany.

1993: Salle d’honneur of the XX, Biennale Internationale de Gravure, Ljubljana.

1997: Grand prix d’honneur of the International Graphic Triennial 1997, Kraków, Poland.

1997: Awarded honorary citizenship at the University of Jena (Friedrich-Schiller University), Germany.
