= Werner Wittig =

Werner Wittig may refer to:

- Werner Wittig (cyclist) (1909–1992), German cyclist
- Werner Wittig (painter) (1930–2013), German painter, engraver and printmaker
- Werner Wittig (politician) (1926–1976), East German politician
