= Wolfgang H. Scholz =

German painter

Wolfgang H. Scholz (born 5 October 1958) is a German painter, photographer and film director. He lives and works in Mexico City and Munich.

== Life ==
Scholz was born and grew up in Dresden, in a family that had been dedicated to woodcraft for several generations. At the beginning of the 1980s he studied building engineering and painting / graphic arts in Dresden. He studied additionally graphology from 1987 to 1988 with Ingeborg Rudolph in Leipzig. In 1989 he went to Munich, where he had a teaching position from 1990 to 1991 at the University of Television and Film (HFF). He works since 1992 for different European TV-broadcasters, for instance Bayerischer Rundfunk, the Mitteldeutscher Rundfunk, the Zweites Deutsches Fernsehen and ARTE. 1994 he founded together with Meinhard Prill the film production company Sic! Film GmbH and shot his first theatrical feature film “Shadow Seeker”, a story about his childhood in Dresden. His artistic work is conceptually tied to photography, as well as multimedia installations and is basically figurative in the area of painting. Connecting elements are movement, time and space, that brought him to create multimedia performances with dancers. 2001 Scholz went to Mexico City. He is married to the Mexican dancer, choreographer and manager of the Centro Cultural "Los Talleres" Isabel Beteta De Cou in Mexico City. In 2013 he was appointed at the Saxon Academy of Arts, Germany. The film museum of the University UNAM and the Museum Chopo (Mexico City) presented 2016 and 2017 a retrospective of his works.

== Selection of solo exhibitions ==
- 2017 Gallery The Clemente, New York City

Museum Chopo, Mexico City

- 2016 Filmotéca UNAM, Mexico City
- 2015 Museum of Art, Querétaro, Mexico
- 2014 Goethe Institut, Mexico City

Gallery Blanco, Buenos Aires, Argentina

- 2013 Cultural Center Borges, Buenos Aires, Argentina

Theater Montes de Oca, San José, Costa Rica La Casona Municipal, Córdoba, Argentina

- 2012 Museum Regional, Guadalajara, Mexico
- 2011 Museum Ex-Convento del Carmen, Guadalajara, Mexico

Gallery José María Velasco, Mexico City, Mexico

- 2010 Gallery UAM Iztapalapa, Mexico City

Gallery Estación Coyoacán of Modern Art, Mexico City

- 2009 Neuer Sächsischer Kunstverein (mit Gerda Lepke), Dresden

Museum del Arzobispado, Mexico City 2008 Gallery „Seminario de Cultura Méxicana“, Mexico City 2005 Museum del Chopo, Mexico City 1994 Black Box, Gasteig, Munich, Germany 1991 Gallery Carl Baasel, Starnberg, Germany

== Selection of group exhibitions ==
- 2017 Savvy Contemporary, Berlin

Haus des Buches, Leipzig, Germany

- 2015 Museum Chopo, Mexico City

City Hall, Dresden, Germany

- 2014 Museum dos Correo, Rio de Janeiro, Brazil

Museum dos Correo, Brasilia, Brazil Gallery Nuett, Dresden, Germany Center of Contemporary Arts, Rosario, Argentina

- 2013 BBK Gallery, Munich, Germany
- 2012 Gallery Vértice, Guadalajara, Mexico
- 2008 Museum für Kunst und Geschichte, Ciudad Juárez, Mexico
- 2006 Gallery Metropolitana, Mexico City
- 1995 Festival der A*Devantgarde im Neuen Theatre, Munich

Kunst Messe, Gallery Walter Bischoff, Los Angeles, USA

- 1993 Theaterhaus, Stuttgart

"20 Munich Artist", Old City Hall Munich

- 1991 Gallery Walter Bischoff, Stuttgart, Germany
- 1990 "Ausgebürgert", Albertinum, Dresden, Germany
- 1989 BBK Gallery, Munich, Germany

== Selection of multimedia performances ==
2017 El Vacio – The Void

- Foro CC Los Talleres, Mexiko-Stadt

2013 Melancholy – Part 1

- Museum Ex-Teresa Contemporary Arts, Mexico City
- Theater Montes de Oca, San José, Costa Rica
- Center of Contemporary Arts, Rosario, Argentina

2013 The Inner Labyrinth

- Museum Ex-Teresa Arte Actual, Mexico City
- Theatre Nacional, San José, Costa Rica
- Center of Contemporary Arts, Rosario, Argentina

2005 Ser Viviente (Life-Beings)

- Museum del Chopo, Mexico City
- Theatre Centro Cultural „Los Talleres“, Mexico City

2002 Cicles

- Theatre of the Instituto Peruano-Norteamericano Lima, Peru
- Theatre Miguel Covarrubias (UNAM), Mexico City
- Theatre de la Danza, Mexico City

2001 Landscapes of Love

- Clemente Soto Velez Cultural Center, New York City, USA
- Fringe Festival for Independent Dance Toronto, Canada
- National Theatre Havanna, Cuba
- Centro Fotográfico „Álvarez Bravo“, Oaxaca, Mexico
- Theatre de la Danza, Mexico City
- Centro de la Imagen, Mexico City

== Selection of films ==
- Time of Crows (2014) theatrical feature film
- The Image Inside (2009) theatrical documentary
- Distant Neighbours (2003) documentary
- Lost Wings (1999) theatrical feature film
- The Real Dream (1995) documentary
- Shadow Seeker (1994) theatrical documentary-fiction film
- The Lithographer von Otto Dix (1992) documentary
- Kohlenlothar (1989/90) documentary
- Body Building (1988) documentary
- Dream 1 (1986) shortfilm / fiction film

== Selection of awards ==
- 2016 Gold Remi Award, International Film Festival Houston, USA
- 2015 Award (Drehbuch), Int. Filmmaker Festival, Milan, Italy
- 2010 Platinum Remi Award, International Film Festival Houston, USA
- 2004 Saxon Journalist Award (First Prize)
- 2000 Silver Award, International Film Festival Houston, USA
- 1991 International Film Festival Dresden (First Prize)
