= Ranft =

Ranft is a German surname. Variant: Ranfft. Notable people with the surname include:

- Albert Ranft (1858–1938), Swedish theatre director and actor
- Angela Ranft (born 1969), German cyclist
- Bryan Ranft (1917–2001), British naval historian
- George Ranft, American film actor and dancer
- Joe Ranft (1960–2005), American screenwriter, animator, storyboard artist, director, voice actor and magician
- Michael Ranft (1700–1774), German Lutheran pastor, writer, historian and expert on vampires
- Richard Ranft (1862–1931), Swiss painter, engraver, illustrator and poster artist
- Thomas Ranft (born 1945), German painter

== See also ==
- Ranftl
