= Karla Woisnitza =

German artist

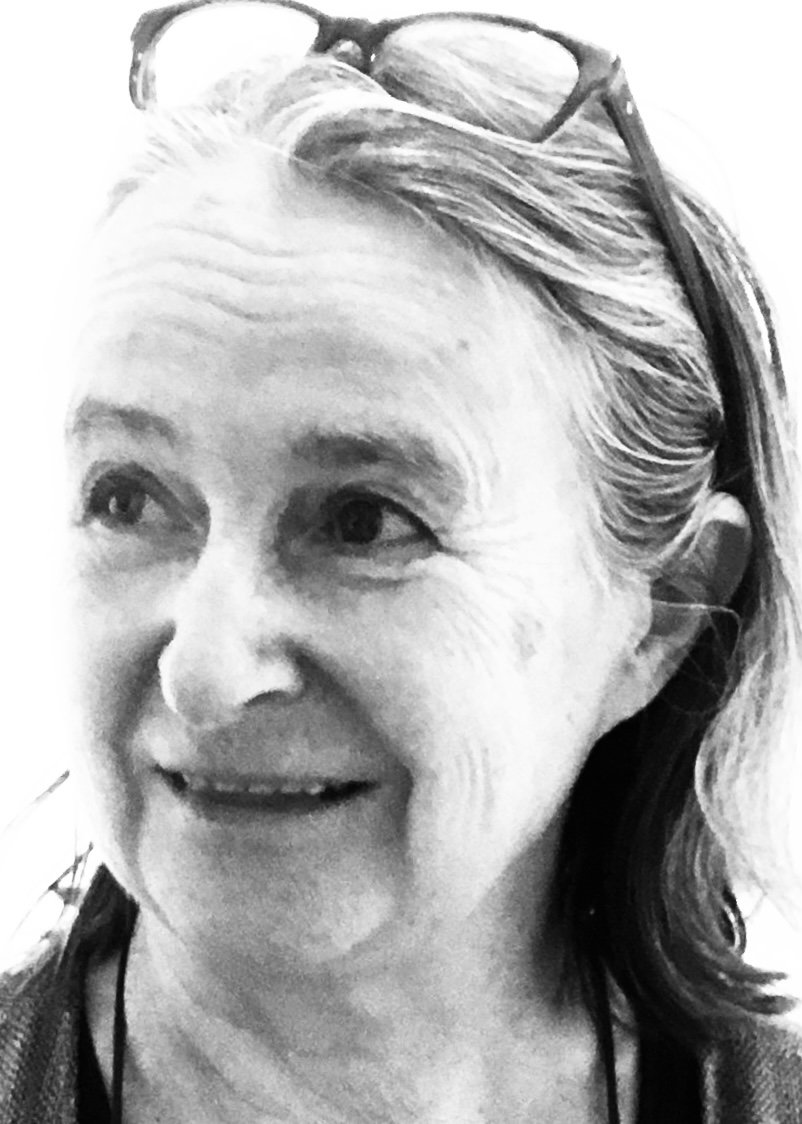
- portrait by Simone Kornfeld, 2019
- Born: 16 August 1952 (age 73); Rüdersdorf, East Germany (now Germany)
- Education: Dresden Academy of Fine Arts

Karla Woisnitza (born 16 August 1952) is a German artist.

== Early life and education ==
Woisnitza was born in Rüdersdorf. Before she went to art school, she took part in a drawing group in her hometown led by the artist Erika Stürmer-Alex. She studied set design from 1973 to 1979 at the Dresden Academy of Fine Arts. In her core curriculum, she studied with Günter Hornig, who was an inspiration to a number of influential performance artists in East Germany and who gave his students room for creative experimentation despite the conservative climate of the academy. During her studies, Woisnitza brought together women artists and founded loose networks. These included her fellow students and upcoming artists like Christine Schlegel, Marie-Luise Bauerschmidt, Sabine Gumnitz, Monika Hanske, Cornelia Schleime, and Angela Schumann. They realized a number of collective events together. These informal performances involved body actions, such as Face Painting Action (Gesichts-malaktion, 1978–1979).

In 1991, Woisnitza received a diploma in painting and graphic design from the Academy.

== Career ==
In 1992, she received the Marianne Werefkin Prize from the Berlin Women Artist Association. From 1993 to 1995, she painted seven large frescoes for the Virchow-Klinikum campus of the Charité hospital in Berlin. In 1994, Woisnitza received the Käthe Kollwitz Prize from the Berlin Academy of Arts. In 2002, she created a fresco for the church hall of the Evangelical church in Rüdersdorf.

Woisnitza was encouraged by two artist/teachers, Gunther Hornig and Erika Sturmer-Alex to do non-conformist conceptual art. She developed "an artistic activation of the body in the interest of female self-assurance and empowerment" and would call "into question traditional representations of femininity as well as the basic difference between internal and external perception."

Woisnitza's work is in the National Museum of Women in the Arts.
