= Ulrike Grossarth =

German artist, dancer, and academic (born 1952)

Ulrike Grossarth (born 1952) is a German artist, dancer, and academic. Since 1998 she has been professor of mixed media art at Dresden Academy of Fine Arts. She was awarded the 2009 Käthe Kollwitz Prize by the Academy of Arts, Berlin for her collective body of work.

== Life ==
She was born in 1952 in Oberhausen, Germany. She studied dance at Else-Lang-Schule in Cologne, in Dresden, and at Folkwang University of the Arts in Essen, and was involved with Joseph Beuys' Free International University, an offshoot of the Fluxus movement.

She teaches at Dresden Academy of Fine Arts in Germany, where her role as professor of mixed media art incorporates performance art, installation art, video art, and assemblages.

== Work ==
Her art is influenced by the ideas of Hannah Arendt and Martin Heidegger. Her 2009 installation Szeroka 28: Ein europäischer Erinnerungsraum (Szeroka 28: A European Memory-Room) addresses the Holocaust.

== Exhibitions ==
- 2014: "Were I made of matter, I would color", Retrospective. Generali Foundation, Vienna
