= Ranftl =

Ranftl is a German surname. Variant: Ranftel. Notable people with the surname include:

- Julian Ranftl (born 1996), Austrian handball player
- Reinhold Ranftl, Austrian footballer

== See also ==
- Ranft
