= Lutz Fleischer =

German painter and graphic artist (1956–2019)

Lutz Fleischer (born 1956 in Dresden - 10 July 2019) was a German painter and graphic artist. He won the Hans-Theo-Richter-Preis of the Sächsische Akademie der Künste in 2005.

== See also ==
- List of German painters
