= Wolfram Adalbert Scheffler =

German painter

Wolfram Adalbert Scheffler (born 1956 in Karl-Marx-Stadt) is a German painter and artist. He won the Hans-Theo-Richter-Preis of the Sächsische Akademie der Künste in 2007.
