= Christa Sammler =

German sculptor (born 1932)

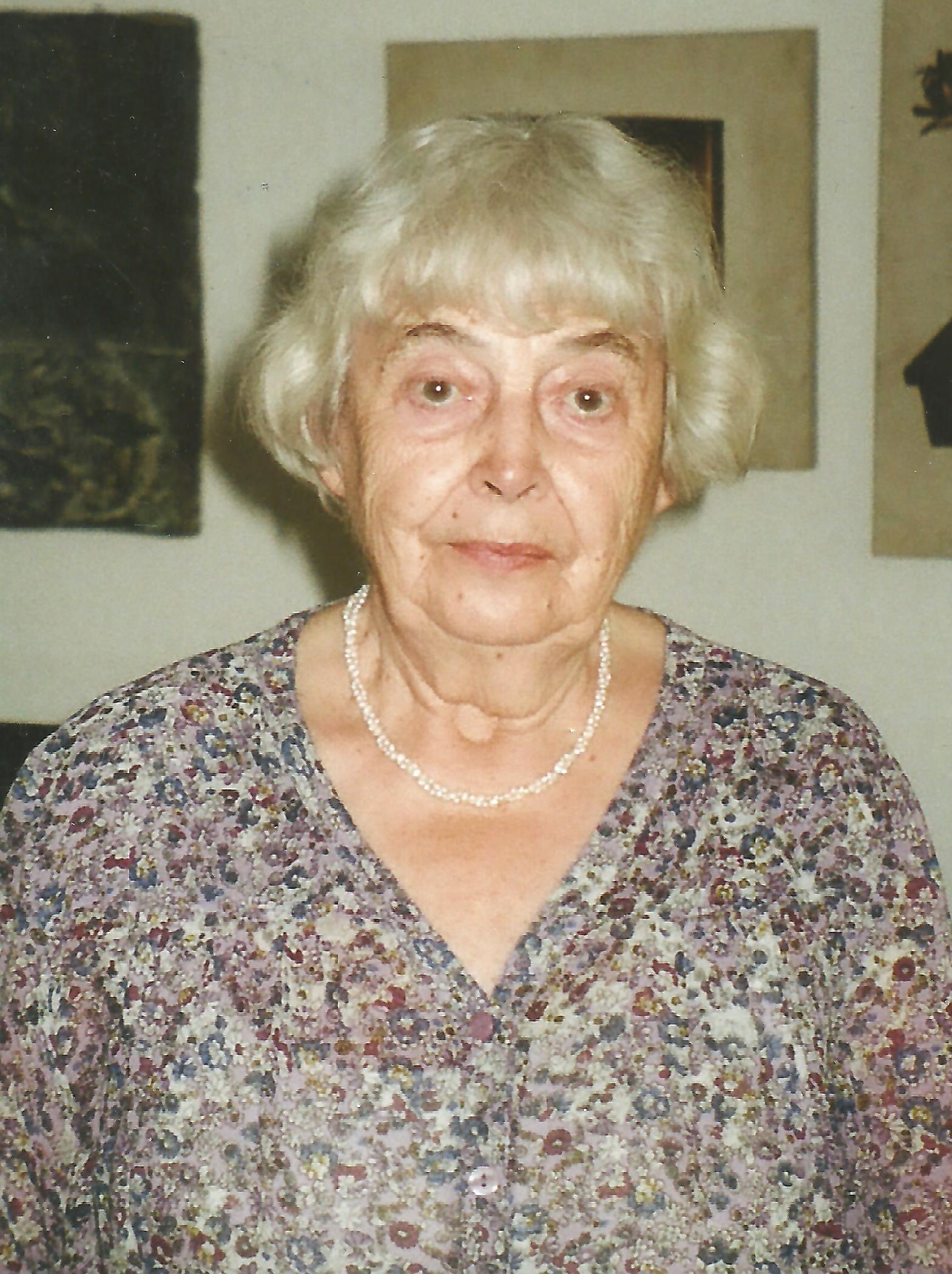
Christa Sammler in 2016

Christa Sammler (born 23 December 1932) is a German sculptor.

== Life ==
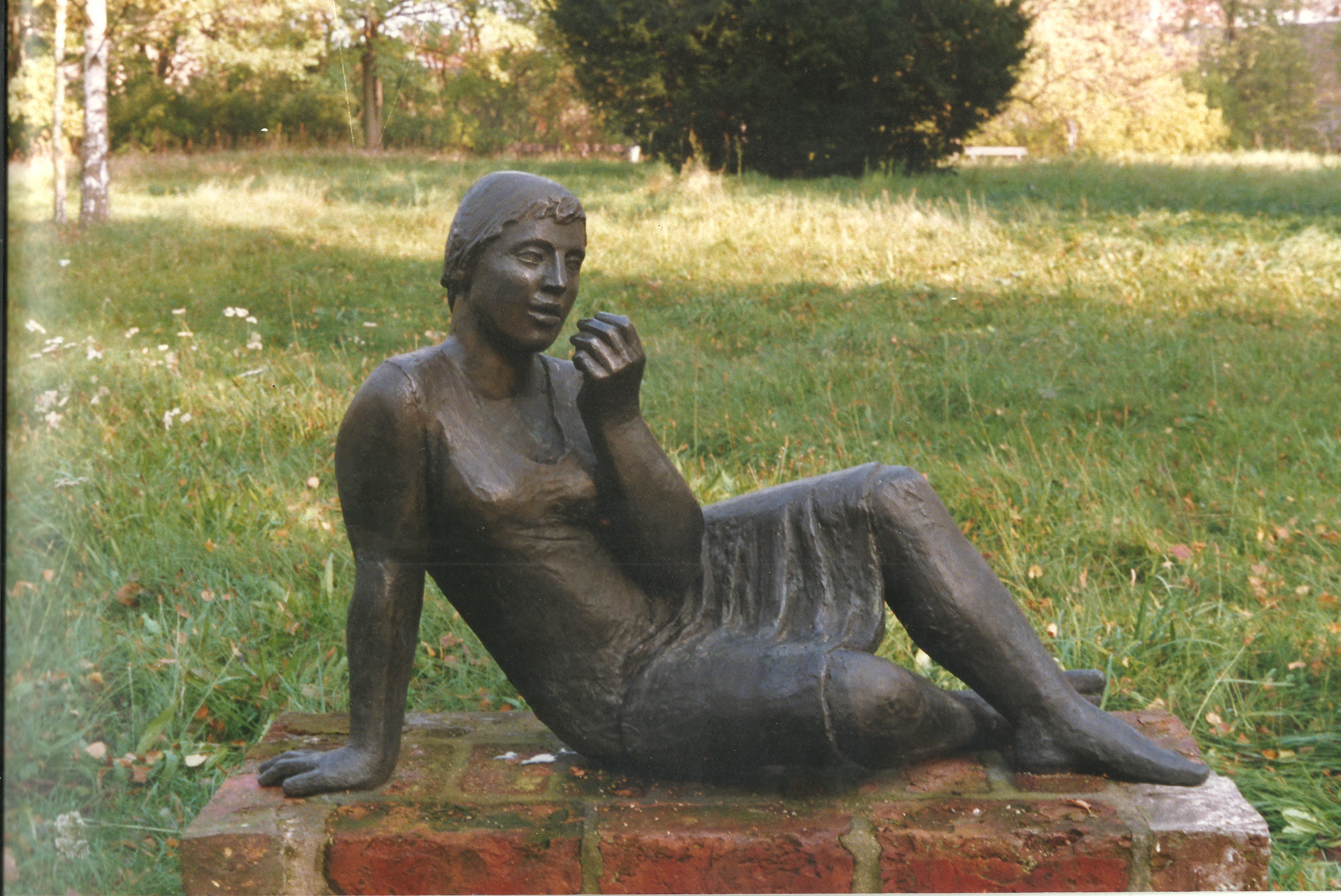
Mädchen mit Apfel Maiden with apple Bronze, 1962

Christa Sammler was born in Breslau (as Wrocław was known at that time). Between 1948 and 1951 she received drawing lessons from Alfred Herzog in Bautzen. 1951 was the year in which she passed her school final exam ("Abitur") which opened the way for a university-level education. She studied between 1951 and 1956 at the Dresden Academy of Fine Arts where she was taught by Walter Arnold. However, it was probably more important in defining her own approach that between 1956 and 1958 she was a "Master student" ("Meisterschülerin") with Gustav Seitz at the East German Academy of Arts. She has worked in Berlin as a freelance artist since 1958.

Alongside her work as a professional sculptor Sammler has made it a priority to focus on rescuing and preserving historical art works and buildings. Projects that have benefitted from her interventions over the years have included the mews in Potsdam's Dutch Quarter and old building facades at the Neues Museum in Berlin.

As a member of the governing executive of the Berlin Historical [Buildings] Society, in 2001 she successfully petitioned Walter Momper, Berlin's former mayor who by this time was president of the Berlin Chamber of Deputies, to ensure an "appropriate" location for the memorial to the reformer Baron vom Stein, in front of the Berlin City Parliament.

It was reported in 2014 that Christa Sammler had transferred her entire artistic estate to the Winckelmann Museum in Stendal (an hour or so to the west of Berlin).

== Prizes and awards (selection) ==
- 1976: Will Lammert Prize from the East German Academy of Arts
- 1985: Art Prize of the German Democratic Republic
- 1988: Käthe Kollwitz Prize from the East German Academy of Arts
