= Max Uhlig =

German painter (born 1937)

Max Uhlig (born 23 June 1937 in Dresden) is a German painter. He won the Hans Theo Richter-Preis of the Sächsische Akademie der Künste in 1998.

== Career ==
From 1955 to 1960, Uhlig studied at the Dresden University of Fine Arts with Hans Theo Richter and Max Schwimmer.

From 1961 to 1963, he was a master student at the German Academy of the Arts in Berlin with Hans Theo Richter. He then worked as a freelancer until 1995. In 1968, he worked with Carlfriedrich Claus on the creation of his first lithographs; later prints were also made for Charlotte E. Pauly, Dieter Goltzsche, Willy Wolff, Otto Niemeyer-Holstein, Heinrich Ehmsen, Hans Theo Richter and Wilhelm Höpfner. Until the early 1970s, the artist emerged only as a graphic artist. In 1978, Max Uhlig presented his characteristic paintings for the first time in the Dresden Kupferstichkabinett.

"Black and white or in colour, lines in the expressive rhythm of their superimposition draw the image mode and the conciseness of an extensive, unmistakable work that is a discovery. Today Max Uhlig is one of the last representatives of the era of open-air painting in modern art that began 150 years ago, but his work elevates it to the height of our time." His late work received significant impulses from annual stays in Faucon (southern France) from 1991 to 2010.

In June 2013, Uhlig's designs for the design of the glass windows for the Gothic St. John's Church in Magdeburg, which was rebuilt from 1994 to 1999, were accepted. The artist himself has been painting directly on glass in the Derix workshops in Taunusstein since spring 2014. From July to October 2014, the drafts and initial work results were on view in the exhibition "Max Uhlig. Grown before nature. Painting and graphics" in the art museum Kloster Unser Lieben Frauen Magdeburg.

Max Uhlig has been a member of the German Association of Artists since 1990 and a founding member of the Saxon Academy of the Arts. From 1995 to 2002, he was the professor for painting and graphics at the University of Fine Arts in Dresden.

As a Dresden painter, Uhlig had already become known before 1989 through participation in exhibitions in Western Europe outside the borders of the GDR. He has been awarded several national and international prizes, including the 1987 Käthe-Kollwitz-Preis of the Akademie der Künste der DDR, the 1991 2nd prize of the 21st International Biennale of São Paulo and the gold medal of the 10th Norsk Internasjonal Grafikk Biennale Fredrikstad, the 1998 Hans-Theo-Richter-Preis and the Saxon Order of Merit, the 2003 art prize of the state capital Dresden and the art prize of the artists on the occasion of the great art exhibition North Rhine-Westphalia in Düsseldorf 2006.

Max Uhlig has been married to Angela Simon since 1999 and now lives and works in the Helfenberg district of Dresden on the site of a former chemical factory.

== Exhibitions ==
- 2014 "Grown before nature", Art Museum Magdeburg Monastery of Our Dear Women
- 2013 "People, Scenes, Landscapes", Gallery Klose, Essen
- 2013 "Man and Landscape", Käthe-Kollwitz-Museum Cologne
- 2012 "Druck", Kupferstichkabinett, Dresden
- 2012 "Painting and Works on Paper", Kunstverein Die Wassermühle e.V., Lohne
- 2012 "Works on Paper", Palais Leopold, Munich
- 2012 "Waiting and Passers-by", Beeskow Castle, Beeskow
- 2011 "Watercolors and colored drawings from three decades", Galerie Döbele, Dresden
- 2011 "Max Uhlig, Claus Weidensdorfer Works on Paper", Brandenburgische Kunstsammlungen Cottbus
- 2011 "Max Uhlig - Black - from the graphic work", Galerie Scheffel, Bad Homburg
- 2010 "Art in GDR Times: Three Nonconforms", Loeper Gallery, Hamburg
- 2009 "In Dialogue with Nature", Gallery Klose, Essen
- 2008 "Artist of the gallery: Angelika Bartholl, Max Uhlig", Gallery von Loeper, Hamburg
- 2007 Galerie Oben, Chemnitz
- 2007 "Drawings", Ningbo Museum of Art, Ningbo (China) and Leonhardi Museum, Dresden
- 2007 "Landscapes", Heck Art Gallery, Chemnitz
- 2007 "Retrospective on the 70th", Galerie am Sachsenplatz, Leipzig
- 2006 "Here Byoung", San Xiang Art Space, Shanghai
- 2006 Gallery Dr. Lehr, Berlin
- 2006 "Symbol Wuyi", San Shang-Art, Beijing and Shanghai Art Museum
- 2005 "Head. Figure. Landscape", Loeper Gallery, Hamburg
- 2004 "Works from 50 Years", Beethovenstrasse Gallery, Düsseldorf
- 2004 "Change of Seasons", Kunsthalle Dominikanerkirche, Osnabrück
- 2004 Aalen Art Association, Aalen
- 2003 "Portraits and Landscapes", Gallery Klose, Essen
- 2002 German Society for Christian Art, Munich
- 2001 Saxon Academy of Arts, Dresden
- 2001 "Early Works 1960-1980", Galerie Oben, Chemnitz
- 2000 "Head Studies + Landscape", Scheffel Gallery, Bad Homburg
- 1999 "Pictures and works on paper 1970 to 1999", Galerie von Loeper, Hamburg
- 1999 "Portraits", Galerie Stefan Röpke, Cologne and Galería Arnés y Röpke, Madrid
- 1998 Municipal Gallery, Schwäbisch Hall
- 1998 Beethovenstrasse Gallery, Düsseldorf
- 1997 Döbele Gallery, Dresden
- 1997 Gallery at Sachsenplatz, Leipzig
- 1996 "Paysage De La Provence. New Portraits", Loeper Gallery, Hamburg
- 1996 "Discovered in the studio - pictures never shown", Beethovenstrasse Gallery, Düsseldorf
- 1995 "For 40 years", Museum Schloss Morsbroich, Leverkusen
- 1995 "Insights", ifa (Institute for Foreign Relations), Berlin
- 1995 "On Paper - Art of the 20th Century at Deutsche Bank", Kunsthalle Schirn, Frankfurt am Main
- 1994 Musée d'Art Moderne et Contemporain, Liège
- 1994 Art Museum in the Ehrenhof, Düsseldorf
- 1994 "Am Mont Ventoux", Galerie Stefan Röpke, Cologne
- 1994 "German Painters after 1945", Busch-Reisinger Museum, Cambridge
- 1993 "Retrospective", Albertinum, Dresden
- 1993 "Head and Figure", Beethovenstrasse Gallery, Düsseldorf
- 1992 "Pictures, Watercolors and Drawings", Loeper Gallery, Hamburg
- 1991 "Paintings and watercolors, drawings and graphics", Museum Schloss Morsbroich, Leverkusen
- 1991 "Nordic Plenary - Impressions of a Landscape", Beethovenstrasse Gallery, Düsseldorf
- 1991 "Blickwechsel", Gallery von Oppenheim, Cologne
- 1990 Galerie Brusberg Berlin (exhibition with Ernst Marow)
- 1990 Museum Waldhof, Bielefeld
- 1990 "Pictures from Germany", Josef-Haubrich-Kunsthalle, Cologne
- 1989 "13 painters from the GDR", Kunsthalle Emden
- 1988 Gallery of the Academy of Arts, Berlin
- 1987 Gallery at Sachsenplatz, Leipzig
- 1986 "From Beuys to Stella - International Graphics", Kupferstichkabinett, Berlin
- 1985 "Dresden today - painting and graphics after 1945", Galerie Döbele, Ravensburg
- 1984 "Max Uhlig - A Painter from Dresden", Brusberg Gallery, Berlin / Hanover
- 1981 "Painting and Graphics of the GDR", Musée d’art modern de la Ville de Paris
- 1980 "Painting and Graphics", Central Institute for Nuclear Research, Rossendorf near Dresden
- 1980 Alvensleben Gallery, Munich
- 1979 Arcade Gallery, Berlin
- 1978 Kupferstichkabinett, Dresden
- 1978 Mouffe Gallery, Paris
- 1977 "Selected watercolors by artists from the GDR", Galerie am Sachsenplatz, Dresden
- 1976 North Gallery, Dresden
- 1974 "25 Years of Graphics in the GDR", Altes Museum, Berlin
- 1974 "Drawings in the Art of the GDR", Kupferstichkabinett, Dresden
- 1972 "Contemporary Art of the GDR", Seibu Museum of Art, Tokyo
- 1971 Museum of Fine Arts, Leipzig
- 1967 State Lindenau Museum, Altenburg
- 1964 "8 young artists", Centralne Biuro Wystaw, Warsaw
- 1963 Humboldt University, Berlin

== Works in museums and public properties ==
- Aachen, Ludwig Forum for International Art
- Albstadt, Albstadt Art Museum
- Altenburg, State Lindenau Museum
- Ann Arbor, University of Michigan – Art Gallery
- Basel, Art Museum
- Berkeley, USA, Berkeley Art Museum
- Berlin, Academy of Arts, Neue Nationalgalerie, Kupferstichkabinett, Ostdeutsche Sparkassenstiftung, Märkisches Museum, ifa (Institute for Foreign Relations), Grundkreditbank, German Bundestag, art collection of the federal government Jakob-Kaiser-Haus
- Braunschweig, Duke Anton Ulrich Museum
- Bremen, Art Gallery
- Budapest, Museum of Fine Arts (Graphische Sammlung)
- Cambridge, Busch-Reisinger Museum (Harvard-University-Art Museum)
- Coburg, municipal art collections of the Veste Coburg
- Dresden, State Art Collections, New Masters Gallery, Kupferstichkabinett, Municipal Gallery, Academy of Sciences, Technical University of Dresden, Dresdner Bank Free State of Saxony (Art Fund), Ostsächsische Sparkasse Dresden, Deutsche Bank, Volksbank
- Düsseldorf, art museum in the courtyard of honor, provincial insurance
- Emden, art gallery
- Erfurt, Angermuseum
- Esslingen, Villa Merkel (municipal gallery), Sparkasse Esslingen
- Frankfurt / Main, Deutsche Bank, Telekom, Museum for Communication
- Frankfurt / Oder, Young Art Gallery
- Gera, Orangery Art Gallery
- Halle (Saale), Kunstmuseum Moritzburg (graphic collection)
- Hamburg, Kunsthalle (graphic collection), ART collection, Evangelical Academy
- Hanover, Lower Saxony Sparkassenstiftung, Lower Saxony State Chancellery, Preussen Elektra, Sprengel Museum, collection of the Norddeutsche Landesbank
- Jena, Romantic House Literature Museum, Jena-Optik
- Kaunas, Ciurlionis Museum
- Kiel, Kunsthalle, Schleswig-Holstein Ministry of Culture
- Leipzig, Museum of Fine Arts, Painting Collection & Graphic Cabinet, Telekom
- Leverkusen, Morsbroich Castle Museum
- Lodz, Museum Sztuky
- London, British Museum (graphic collection), Tate Gallery (graphic collection), Victoria & Albert Museum (graphic collection)
- Mainz, ZDF - art collection
- Magdeburg, Kunstmuseum Kloster Unser Lieben Frauen
- Magdeburg, St. Johannis Church, artistically designed glazing of the 14 large Gothic windows (2014–2020)
- Munich, Städtische Galerie im Lenbachhaus, State Gallery of Modern Art (graphic collection), Dresdner Bank
- New York, Metropolitan Museum of Art (Graphic Collection), McCrory Corporation
- Nuremberg, Germanic National Museum, Nuremberg Art Gallery
- Oberhausen, Stadtische Galerie Schloss Oberhausen
- Osnabrück, Felix Nussbaum House
- Paris, National Library of France
- Regensburg, Art Forum East German Gallery
- Rostock, Rostock art gallery
- Schleswig, Gottorf Castle Museum
- Schwerin, State Museum
- Seoul, South Korea, Korea University
- St. Louis, St. Louis Art Museum, Saint Louis University Museum, Pulitzer Foundation
- Stuttgart, State Gallery, IBM Collection, Daimler Art Collection
- Szczecin, National Museum
- Warsaw, National Museum (Graphic Collection)
- Washington, Library of Congress (Graphic Collection)
- Weimar, State Art Collections
- Vienna, Albertina (graphic collection)
- Wiesbaden, Wiesbaden Museum
- Würzburg, Diocesan Museum

== Literature ==
- Francisco Tanzer, Max Uhlig: Zeichen und Zeilen. Poems and pictures. Rimbaud, Aachen 1999. ISBN 3-89086-826-6
- Renate Wiehager; Christian Gögger; Galerie Döbele GmbH, Dresden (Ed.): Max Uhlig: Aquarelle und farbige Zeichnungen aus drei Jahrzehnten. Sandstein Verlag, Dresden 2011, ISBN 978-3-942422-47-5
- Agnes Matthias; Bernhard Maaz; Kupferstich-Kabinett, Dresden (ed.): Max Uhlig. Druck. Sandstein Verlag, Dresden 2012, ISBN 978-3-95498-006-2
- Annegret Laabs (ed.): Max Uhlig. Die Fenster der Johanniskirche/The Windows of the St. Johannis Church, Hirmer Verlag, Munich 2020, ISBN 978-3-7774-3657-9

=== Exhibition catalogs ===
- Max Uhlig - works on paper. Städtische Galerie Albstadt, February 4 to March 17, 1996. Albstadt 1996. ISBN 3-923644-68-X
- Max Uhlig - On Mont Ventoux. Pictures from southern France 1991 to 1993. Villa Merkel, Gallery of the City of Esslingen am Neckar, January 16–13. February 1994. Cantz, Ostfildern 1994. ISBN 3-89322-609-5
- Max Uhlig - paintings, watercolors, drawings, graphics, sketchbooks. Kupferstich-Kabinett, Staatliche Kunstsammlungen Dresden, December 5, 1993–13. February 1994. Dresden 1993.
- Lothar Lang: Max Uhlig, street scenes. Drawings 1984–1987. Exhibition from April 7 to June 17, 1990. State Museum Schloss Burgk, Neue Galerie. Burgk (Saale) 1990. ISBN 3-86103-011-X
- Max Uhlig (* 1937), Mensch und Landschaft, January 17 to March 17, 2013, Käthe Kollwitz Museum Cologne
