= August Macke Prize =

The August Macke Prize, named after the painter August Macke, was given the first time in 1959 by the districts Arnsberg, Brilon, Meschede and Olpe in the region of the Hochsauerland, Germany.

With the award the recipients get the offer to show their works in museum show in Arnsberg and get a monetary prize of 20,000 €.

== Recipients ==
- 1959: Carl Josef Hoffmann, Gebhard Schwermer
- 1964: Christa Biederbick
- 1969: Christine Bandau, Ruth Hoffmann and Claus Harnischmacher
- 1975: Bernd Bohmeier, Theo Lambertin
- 1978: Emil Schumacher
- 1981: Monika Hollekamp
- 1984: Günter Ferdinand Ris
- 1987: Gotthard Graubner
- 1990: Fujio Akai
- 1993: Herbert Bardenheuer
- 1996: Heribert Friedland
- 2000: Ansgar Nierhoff
- 2005: Matthias Weischer
- 2008: Leiko Ikemura
- 2011: Corinne Wasmuht
- 2014: Kerstin Brätsch
- 2017: Michael Sailstorfer
- 2022: Toulu Hassani

== See also ==
- List of European art awards
