= Rüdersdorf =

Rüdersdorf bei Berlin
- Municipality
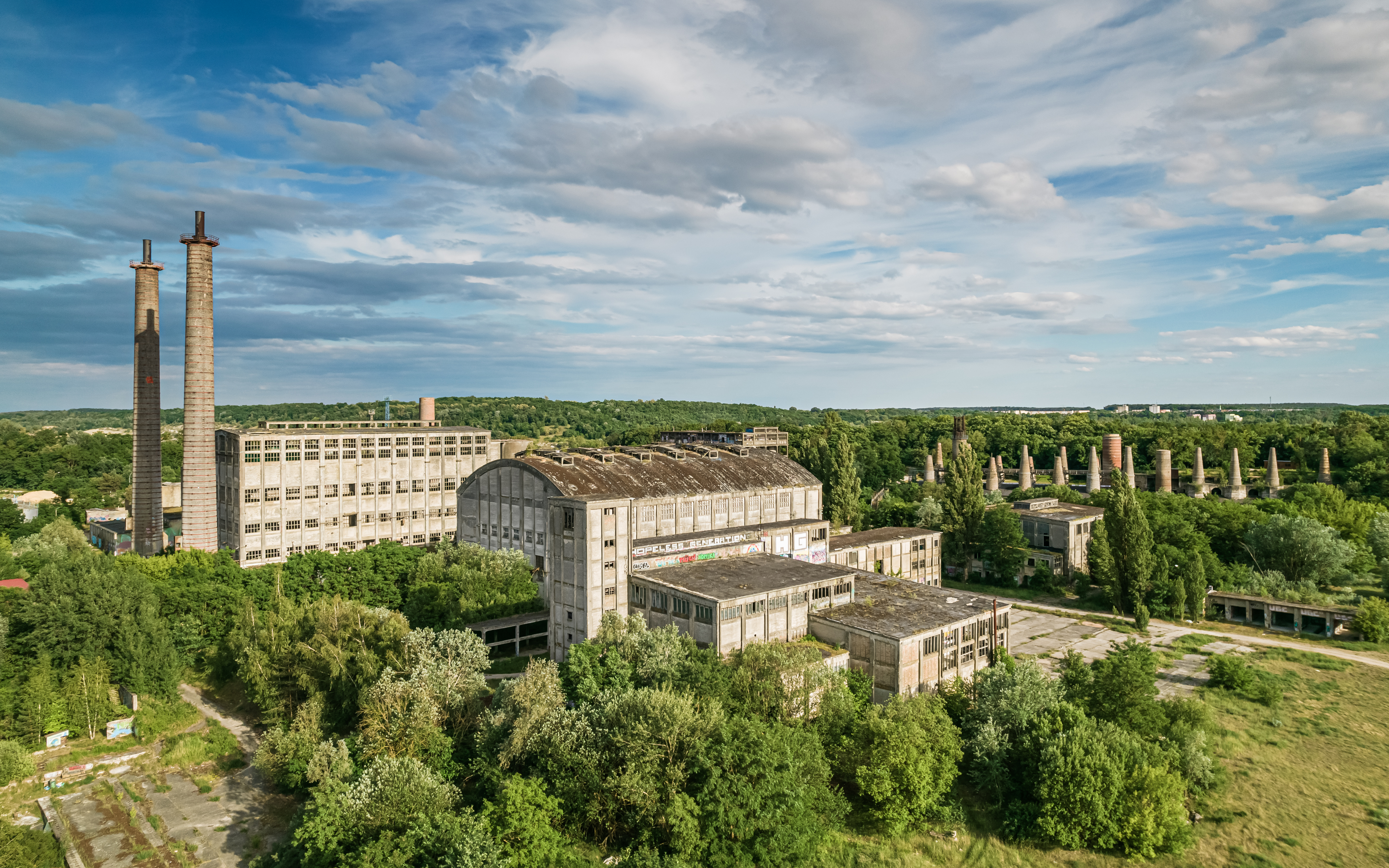
- Open-air museum in Rüdersdorf

- Coat of arms

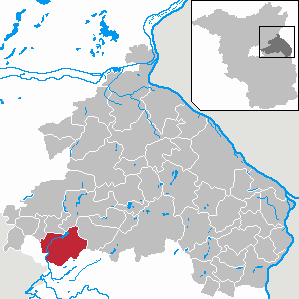
- Location of Rüdersdorf bei Berlin within Märkisch-Oderland district
- Interactive map of Rüdersdorf bei Berlin
- Location within Germany Location within Brandenburg
- Coordinates: 52°28′18″N 13°47′04″E
- Country: Germany
- State: Brandenburg
- District: Märkisch-Oderland
- Subdivisions: 4 Ortsteile

Government
  - Mayor (2019–27): Sabine Löser

Area
  - Total: 70.39 km^{2} (27.18 sq mi)
- Elevation: 62 m (203 ft)

Population (2025-12-31)
  - Total: 15,898
  - Density: 225.9/km^{2} (585.0/sq mi)
- Time zone: UTC+01:00 (CET)
  - Summer (DST): UTC+02:00 (CEST)
- Postal codes: 15562
- Dialling codes: 033638
- Vehicle registration: MOL
- Website: www.ruedersdorf.de

Rüdersdorf bei Berlin (German pronunciation: [ˈʁyːdɐsdɔʁf baɪ bɛʁˈliːn], lit. 'Rüdersdorf near Berlin') is a municipality in the district Märkisch-Oderland, in Brandenburg, Germany, near Berlin.

It is served by the Schöneiche bei Berlin tramway which runs from Rüdersdorf through Schöneiche to Berlin-Friedrichshagen station on the Berlin S-Bahn network. Bundesautobahn 10 passes through the town.

== Overview ==
The municipality is situated 26 km (16 mi) east of Berlin centre and includes the three districts Hennickendorf, Herzfelde and Lichtenow. Rüdersdorf is noted for its open-cast limestone mine. Today, some parts of the mine are used as a museum Museumspark Rüdersdorf. Notable buildings in Berlin such as the Brandenburg Gate and the Olympiastadium were built with limestone from Rüdersdorf.

== Demography ==
Development of population since 1875 within the current boundaries (blue line: population; dotted line: comparison to population development of Brandenburg state; grey background: time of Nazi rule; red background: time of communist rule)

Recent population development and projections (population development before 2011 census (blue line); recent population development according to the Census in Germany in 2011 (blue bordered line); official projections for 2005-2030 (yellow line); for 2017-2030 (scarlet line); for 2020-2030 (green line)

Rüdersdorf bei Berlin: Population development
within the current boundaries (2020)

Year	Pop.	±% p.a.
1875	9,044	—
1890	10,742	+1.15%
1910	16,190	+2.07%
1925	17,041	+0.34%
1939	18,328	+0.52%
1950	17,624	−0.36%
1964	18,028	+0.16%

Year	Pop.	±% p.a.
1971	18,385	+0.28%
1981	17,931	−0.25%
1985	18,219	+0.40%
1990	17,533	−0.76%
1995	16,338	−1.40%
2000	16,256	−0.10%
2005	15,880	−0.47%

Year	Pop.	±% p.a.
2010	15,316	−0.72%
2015	15,313	−0.00%
2016	15,382	+0.45%
2017	15,569	+1.22%
2018	15,696	+0.82%
2019	15,812	+0.74%
2020	16,025	+1.35%

== Coat of arms ==
Coat of arms of the municipality Rüdersdorf bei Berlin

The coat of arms of Gemeinde Rüdersdorf bei Berlin shows a rooted green lime tree with two red shields on its side. The shield towards the left of the trunk shows the silver hammer and pick as a symbol for the limestone quarrying: An industry which has shaped this municipality and is still present to this day. On the right side of the trunk, the shield symbolizes a silver turnip which represents the local agriculture. Both industries have been implanted back in the 13th century by the monks of the Zinna Abbey.

== Notable people ==
- Johanna Elberskirchen (1864–1943), activist
- Giacomo Meyerbeer (1791–1864), opera composer
- Andreas Thom (born 1965), footballer
- Anne Wizorek (born 1981), author, journalist and feminist
- Karla Woisnitza (born 1952), artist
- Max Marzillier (born 2001), paralympic track-athlete

== Partnerships with other communes ==
- Hemmoor in Lower Saxony, since 1991
- Pierrefitte-sur-Seine in France, since 1966
- Lomma Municipality in Sweden, since 2007
- Popielów in Poland, since 1997
