= Corinne Wasmuht =

German artist

- Born: 1964 (age 61–62); Dortmund, Germany
- Education: Kunstakademie Düsseldorf
- Occupation: visual artist
- Known for: oil paint on wooden boards

Corinne Wasmuht (born 1964) is a German visual artist based in Berlin.

== Early life and education ==
Wasmuht was born in 1964 in Dortmund, Germany. From 1983 to 1992 she studied at the Kunstakademie Düsseldorf in Düsseldorf, Germany.

== Career ==
Wasmuht's work deals with issues such as globalization, economic crisis, the proliferation of technology, and modern warfare. She makes paintings in oil paint on wooden boards, using many coats of varnish to add to the brightness of the colours. Her images consist of layered fictional environments that reference abstract painting. Wasmuht paints all elements of her complexly layered and graphic paintings entirely by hand. Of her Bibliotheque/CDG-BSL (2011), Peter Plagens said: "As is often the case, a single work can represent the thrust of a show. Here it's Corinne Wasmuht's enormous triptych... It's a daunting painting... Its wildly varying scale (partial human figures five feet tall to some no more than little clots of paint) and institutional glare are supposed to say something, one assumes, about the socially, politically and culturally overwhelmed and unmoored state in which we currently exist."

== Other activities ==
Wasmuht was part of the jury that awarded the Academy of Arts' Käthe Kollwitz Prize to Nan Goldin in 2022.

== Art market ==
Wasmuht was represented by Johann König until 2022.

== Honours and awards ==
- 1996: ars viva prize, Cologne
- 2008: Heitland Foundation, Celle
- 2011: Oberrheinischer Kunstpreis, Offenburg
- 2011: August Macke Prize, Meschede
- 2014: Käthe Kollwitz Prize by the Academy of Arts, Berlin
