= Herbert Sandberg =

German artist and caricaturist (1908–1991)

Sandberg in 1955

Herbert Sandberg (April 18, 1908 – March 18, 1991) was a German artist and caricaturist. He was best known for his caricatures in the satirical magazine, Ulenspiegel, which he co-founded and art directed. He is also well known for his drawings of Bertolt Brecht and for his column, Der freche Zeichenstift in the magazine, Das Magazin. A member of the Communist Party, a Jew, and a German Resistance fighter, Sandberg spent 10 years in a Nazi prison and in Buchenwald concentration camp. He conceived the idea for Ulenspiegel while a prisoner there and began working on it almost immediately on liberation.

== Life and work ==
"We didn't know" (1964) Self-portrait as Buchenwald survivor giving a tour to residents days after liberation in 1945

Sandberg was born in Posen. He studied art in Breslau, first at the Kunstgewerbeschule from 1925 to 1926 and then with Otto Mueller at the state Akademie für Kunst und Kunstgewerbe. He began working as a newspaper artist in Berlin in 1928, working at the Berliner Tageblatt and the Wahre Jacob among others, until 1933. In 1929, he joined the Association of Revolutionary Visual Artists. Because of his activities with the Communist Party of Germany, which had been banned after the Nazis seized power, and because of his active opposition to the Nazis, Sandberg was arrested and in 1934, charged with "preparing to commit high treason" and sentenced to a term in Brandenburg-Görden Prison. From 1938 until the end of World War II, Sandberg, as a Jew and Communist, was imprisoned in Buchenwald concentration camp. While at Buchenwald, he met Emil Carlebach, who was Sandberg's last Blockältester there. Eighteen drawings, made in 1944 with soot and whiting and smuggled out of the camp, were later published in a group of works from 1944–1946, called "A Friendship".

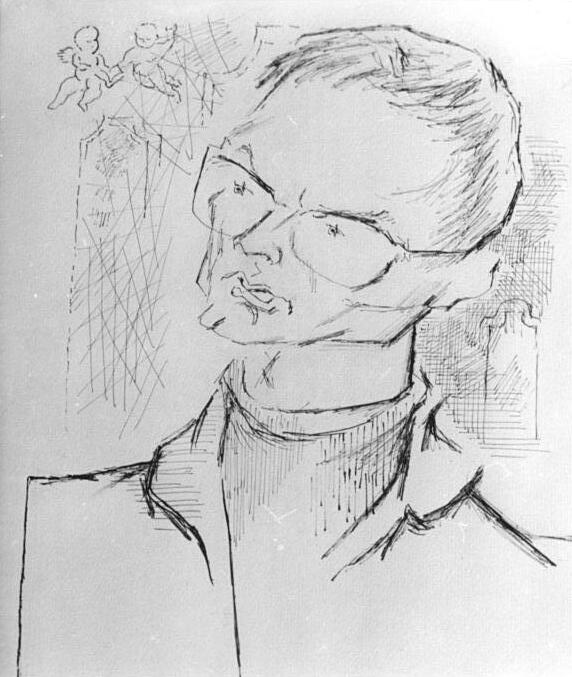
Sandberg's caricature of Hermann Kant

After the war, Sandberg and Günther Weisenborn became the co-publishers of Ulenspiegel, a satirical journal that was published from December 1945 till August 1950, first under license by the American military government, then from 1948, by the Soviet military administration, until the magazine's license was rescinded. In 1947, Sandberg began designing stage sets with his wife, Eugenie Sandberg (1923–1996), who was trained as scenic and costume designer. Calling themselves the "Sandbergkollektiv", they worked for Berlin theaters until 1961. In the beginning, his sister-in-law, Rosemarie Spies, a ceramicist, worked with them. In 1954, Sandberg became the chief editor at the magazine, Bildende Kunst, staying there until 1957, after which he worked freelance in Berlin. In 1970, he began teaching as a guest docent at the Hochschule für Grafik und Buchkunst Leipzig and was named a professor there in 1972. Sandberg was a member of the Akademie der Künste in East Germany.

Sandberg created satirical columns which were well read. From 1954–1990, Sandberg had a column called Der freche Zeichenstift ("The Cheeky Sketching Pencil") in Das Magazin, where he drew caricatures of the nationally and internationally known. Also beginning in 1954, he began a series called "Mit spitzer Feder" in the Sunday edition of the newspaper, Neues Deutschland and in 1967, he began a series of portraits in the Neue Berliner Illustrierte, called Sandbergs kleine Galerie.

In 1988, speaking about the meaning of art in the concentration camp, Sandberg said, "Without the memory of their work (Hogarth's, Goya's, Kollwitz', Grosz' and Masereel's), I would not have had the strength to withstand the difficult imprisonment."

Sandberg's second marriage was to actress Lilo Grahn (1943–2007), lasting from 1981 until his death. His friend, artist Ronald Paris, gave the eulogy and the sculpture on his gravestone is by sculptor Ingeborg Hunzinger.

== Awards and recognition ==
Sandberg received numerous awards and honors in his lifetime and has been recognized since, as well.

- 1958 Medal for Fighters against Fascism 1933 to 1945
- 1966 Johannes R. Becher Prize, gold
- 1967 Art Prize of the German Democratic Republic
- 1972 Käthe Kollwitz Prize, Akademie der Künste in Berlin
- 1973 National Prize of East Germany
- 1978 Patriotic Order of Merit, gold
- 1983 National Prize of the GDR, First Class, for Art and Literature

There were a number of articles and exhibits in honor of the 100th anniversary of Sandberg's birth. Also in April 2008, an aquatint etching by Sandberg was chosen as the "Image of the Month" at the Buchenwald Memorial. The etching, done in 1964 and in the art collection of the Buchenwald and Mittelbau-Dora Memorial, is called "Das haben wir nicht gewusst" ("We didn't know") and depicts himself as a survivor, showing local residents the pile of bodies and ashes next to the crematorium. The Germans are well fed and well dressed and they look horrified, but profess their ignorance as to what was taking place in their midst for over a decade.

== Selected works ==
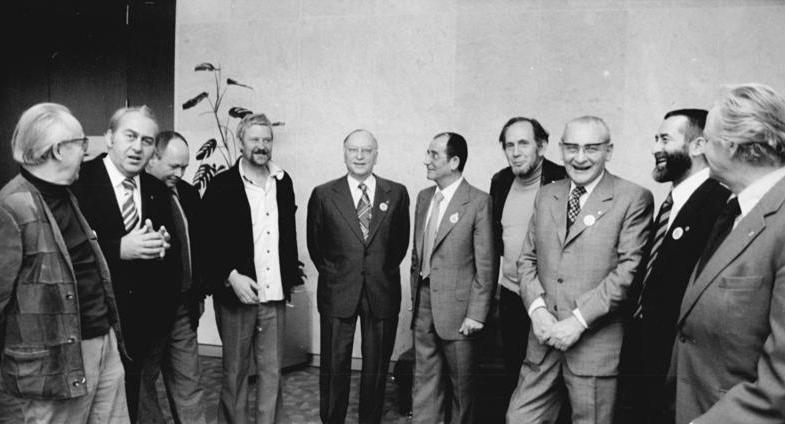
Herbert Sandberg (l.) at the 8th Congress of the Federations of Visual Artists of the GDR, 1978

Graphic art series

- 1944-46 "Eine Freundschaft"
- 1957-61 "Atom, Atom"
- 1958-65 "Der Weg"
- 1959-68 "Erinnerungen an Brecht"
- 1963 "Meister der Musik"
- 1967-68 "Bilder zum Kommunistischen Manifest"
- 1982/83 "Der anachronistische Zug"

Graphic illustrations

- 1927 "Der Dichter Klabund"
- 1948 "Die Eiferer"
- 1948 "Verschiedener Meinung"
- 1957 "Anne Frank"
- 1959 "Brechts Verhör"
- 1975 "David und Goliath"

Books and illustrations

- 1949 Eine Freundschaft. 30 Holzschnittskizzen. Aufbau-Verlag, Berlin 1949.
- 1955 Der Herrenspiegel. 30 Köpfe. Verlag Volk und Welt, Berlin 1955.
- 1956 Eine schöne Wirtschaft. Kongreßverlag, Berlin 1956.
- 1958 Mit spitzer Feder. 50 bekannte Köpfe und unbekannte Anekdoten. Eulenspiegel Verlag, Berlin 1958.
- 1963 Der freche Zeichenstift. Eulenspiegel Verlag, Berlin 1963.
- 1967 Mein Brecht Skizzenbuch. Aufbau-Verlag, Berlin 1967.
- 1988 Spiegel eines Lebens. Aufbau-Verlag, Berlin und Weimar 1988. ISBN 3-351-01017-6

== Filmography ==
- 1968, East German television: “Geliebte Kunst, Herbert Sandberg - Der Weg”. A film by Irmtraut Wecks
- 1969, DEFA: “Ein Weg zum Manifest”. A film by Gerhard Jentsch
- 1980, DEFA / East German television: “Der freche Zeichenstift”. Director: Hanna Emuth
