= Hede Bühl =

German sculptor

- Born: 8 June 1940 (age 85); Düsseldorf, Nazi Germany
- Known for: Sculpture

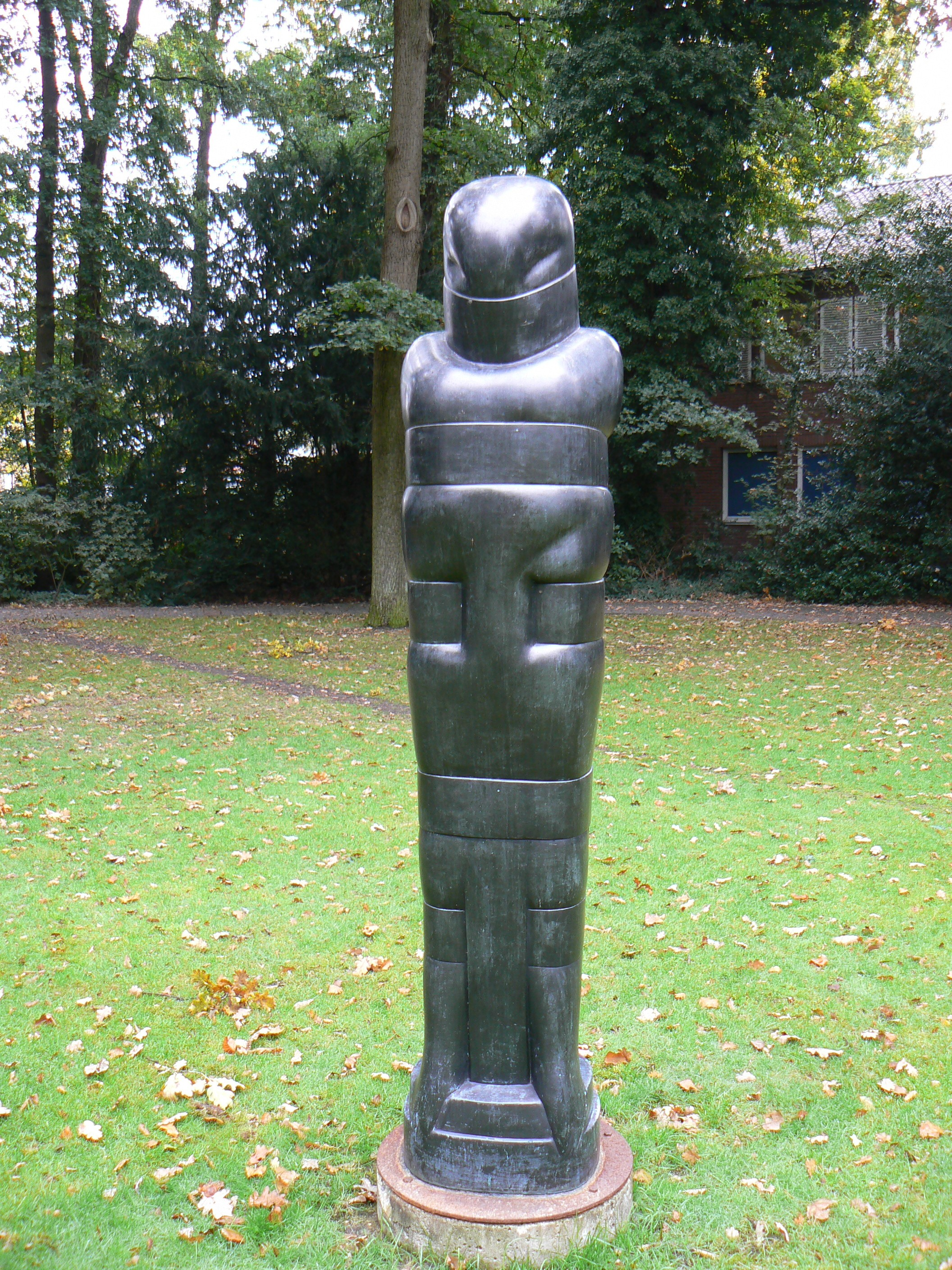
Large Standing Figure, 1971, Nordhorn

Hede Bühl (8 June 1940, Haan, near Düsseldorf) is a German sculptor who lives and works in Düsseldorf. She studied under Joseph Beuys and worked in the studio of Ewald Mataré. Her work has received numerous awards, including the Villa Romana prize (1973), the Villa Massimo fellowship (1979), and the Käthe Kollwitz Prize from the Academy of Arts, Berlin (2007).
