= Eulenspiegel (magazine) =

German humor magazine

- Editor in chief: Mathias Wedel
- Categories: Satire
- Frequency: Monthly
- Circulation: 110,000
- Founded: 1954; 71 years ago
- Company: Eulenspiegel GmbH
- Country: Germany
- Based in: Berlin
- Language: German
- Website: satiremagazin.de
- ISSN: 0423-5975

Eulenspiegel – Das Satiremagazin is a German humor and satirical magazine. It is published by Eulenspiegel GmbH in Berlin. It is one of three East German magazines that survived after German reunification. The other two are das Magazin and Guter Rat.

== History ==
Eulenspiegel is a successor of the satirical publication Frischer Wind, which began publishing in 1946. The publication took the title Eulenspiegel in 1954, after the similarly titled but unconnected satirical magazine Ulenspiegel ceased publishing in 1950.

Until 1972, Eulenspiegel was published by Eulenspiegel Verlag, also founded in 1954, which later became an independent book publisher. It was the only satirical magazine in the German Democratic Republic.
