= Guter Rat =

German consumer magazine

- Editor-in-chief: Robert Schneider
- Categories: Business magazine; Consumer magazine
- Frequency: Monthly
- Circulation: 193,784 (Q4, 2014)
- Publisher: Super Illu Verlag
- Founded: 1945
- First issue: 1 November 1945; 80 years ago
- Company: Hubert Burda Media
- Country: German Democratic Republic; Germany
- Based in: Berlin
- Language: German
- Website: www.guter-rat.de
- ISSN: 0017-582X
- OCLC: 724615930

Guter Rat (German: Good Advice) is a monthly business and consumer magazine published first in the German Democratic Republic (GDR). The magazine is one of three East German magazines which have survived German reunification, including Eulenspiegel and das Magazin.

== History and profile ==
Guter Rat was first published in the German Democratic Republic. The first issue appeared in Leipzig in November 1945. The magazine was owned by Otto Beyer Verlag and was published by the company on a quarterly basis during this period.

Following reunification Guter Rat began to be published monthly by the Gong Verlag. Then its publisher became the Super Illu, and the magazine also became part of the Hubert Burda Media in December 2000. It has its headquarters in Berlin.

== Content and editors ==
Guter Rat was a socialist consumer magazine when it was published in the GDR. During this period the magazine provided its readers with financial advice that was not related to their needs, but what the editors felt was significant. For instance, the magazine reinforced the use of plastic goods in line with the policies of the state. In June 2010 the magazine was redesigned to expand its coverage.

Werner Zedler served as the editor-in-chief of Guter Rat who was appointed to the post in 1998. As of 2015 Robert Schneider was the editor-in-chief of the monthly.

== Circulation ==
In 2000 Guter Rat sold 230,000 copies. The magazine was the best-selling business magazine in Germany with a circulation of 264,000 copies in 2005. Its circulation was 266,000 copies in 2006. In 2010 the monthly sold 285,232 copies. During the fourth quarter of 2014 its circulation was 193,784 copies.

== See also ==
List of magazines in Germany
