= Karl Holtz =

German artist and cartoonist

Karl Holtz (14 January 1899, Berlin – 18 April 1978 Rehbrücke) was a German artist and cartoonist.

During the November Revolution his caricatures were published in the newspaper The Red Flag and the journal Die Aktion. Holtz took part in 1919 in the fighting in Berlin. From 1920 to 1923 he traveled through Germany, Italy, France and Tunisia.

After the Second World War Holtz lived in East Germany where he participated in the Ulenspiegel magazine.

When the Swiss satirical magazine Nebelspalter published a caricature of Stalin by him, Holtz was arrested. A Soviet military court sentenced him in 1949 to a prison sentence of 25 years, which was enforced in Bautzen prison. On July 25, 1956, he was released by way of a pardon, but was not in rehabilitation at that time.
