= Arno Mohr =

German painter and graphic artist

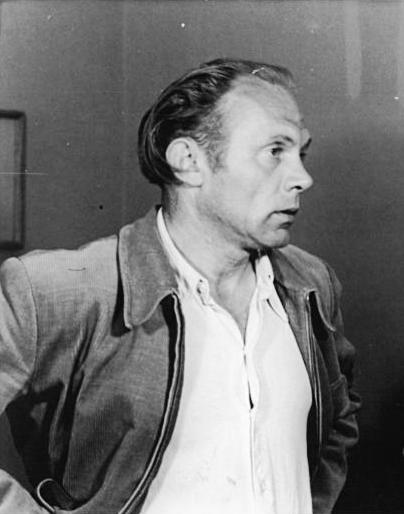
- Arno Mohr (1950)
- Born: 29 July 1910; Posen, Germany
- Died: 23 May 2001 (aged 90); Berlin, Germany
- Occupations: Painter; Graphic artist
- Children: Thomas Mohr

Arno Mohr (29 July 1910 – 23 May 2001) was a German painter and graphic artist, primarily associated with the German Democratic Republic and, more particularly, with Berlin. Almost unknown in the west, his work was popular in East Germany, notably for his reductionist observational drawings of everyday life.

== Life ==
Arno Mohr was born in Posen which at that time was in Germany. His father is variously described as "an officer" and as a "military musician". Between 1924 and 1927 Mohr undertook an apprenticeship as a sign painter with a firm in the city called Ladewig & Co and embarked on a life as a journeyman artist. In 1929/30 he was attending evening classes at the Arts and Crafts College. By 1930, with his parents, he had relocated to Berlin. Eventually, in 1933/34 he started a course of study at the Unified National Academy for Visual and Applied Arts in Berlin-Charlottenburg, hoping to use the opportunity to find his own "artistic signature". Here he was taught anatomy drawing by Wilhelm Tank with whom he would later form an artistically based friendship. Nevertheless, he only stayed for two terms, later explaining that in the aftermath of the Nazi take-over, he found the academy "too loud" ("zu laut").

Several years of casual employment followed. In the late summer of 1939. war resumed and Mohr joined the army. He survived, and by now in his mid 30s returned to Berlin in 1946. For the May 1946 Labour Day celebrations he got hold of a large piece of board that had been intended to seal broken window frames and drew on it a face with exaggerated features, accompanied by a casually discarded carnation. The resulting poster caught the mood of the moment and became, without any drama, his entry ticket for a career as an artist in the Soviet occupation zone (after October 1949 the German Democratic Republic).

In 1946 Mohr was appointed professor at the Fine and Applied Arts Academy at Berlin-Weissensee. The position was one he retained for a remarkable 29 years, till 1974. As an artist Mohr never adopted the style of socialist realism favoured by the country's ruling Socialist Unity Party (Sozialistische Einheitspartei Deutschlands / SED): his work always retained a certain apolitical humanity. Delight in the joy and humour to be found in scenes from everyday life, along with his involvement with craft-based human-scale artistry, did nothing to compromise Mohr's basic commitment to the socialist principals espoused by the East German political class, however. At this time he got to know Otto Dix as well as the artist and printer Alfred Erhardt. This led to the establishment of a printing workshop at the Weisseensee Academy, with Arno Mohr in charge of it. It also led him subsequently to set up his own printing workshop in Berlin-Lichtenberg.

== Works and exhibitions ==
Between 1950 and 1990 Arno Mohr's work featured in numerous solo and joint exhibitions, both within the German Democratic Republic and abroad. His portraits of Bertolt Brecht and Helene Weigel are particularly well known, as is his 1989 landscape " Blick zum Bode-Museum".

In 2000 a particularly high-profile exhibition of his work took place at the Academy of Arts in Berlin.

== Awards, honours and memberships ==
- 1961 Käthe Kollwitz Prize
- 1962 Goethe Prize from the City of Berlin
- 1970 Membership of the Berlin Academy of Arts
- 1974 Chairman if the National League of Visual Artists
- 1980 National Prize of East Germany 1st Class for Arts and Literature
- 1984 Order of Karl Marx
- 1985 Goethe Prize from the City of Berlin (repeat award)
- 1993 Membership of the Berlin Academy of Arts-Brandenburg (post reunification)
