= Thomas Ranft =

German painter (born 1945)

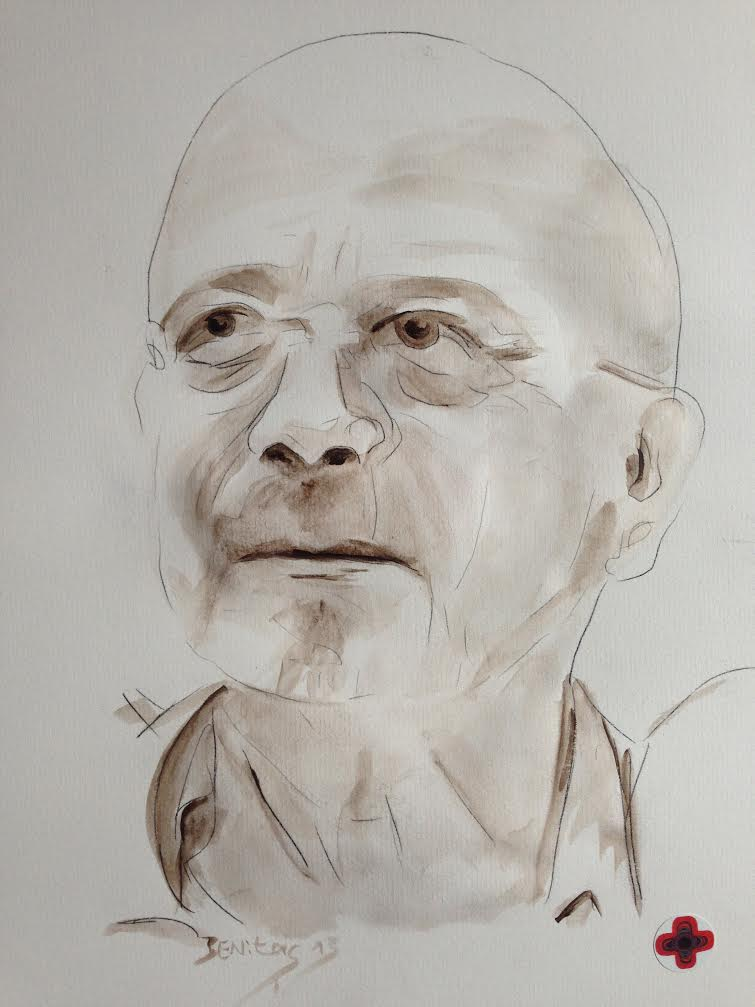
A photo of Thomas Ranft

Thomas Ranft (born 1945, in Königsee) is a German painter. He won the Hans-Theo-Richter-Preis of the Sächsische Akademie der Künste in 2003.
