= Erika Stürmer-Alex =

German artist (born 1938)

- Born: 4 February 1938 (age 88); Wriezen, Province of Brandenburg, Prussia, Germany
- Occupation: Artist
- Website: http://www.stuermer-alex.de/

Erika Stürmer-Alex (born 4 February 1938 in Wriezen) is a German artist whose works include wall paintings, panel paintings, printed graphics, collage sculptures, polyester sculptures and installations.

== Life ==
Erika Stürmer-Alex studied painting, graphic arts, and architectural art from 1958 to 1963 at the Hochschule für bildende und angewandte Kunst in Berlin-Weißensee. Her instructors included Herbert Behrens-Hangeler and Kurt Robbel. She was a member of the Verband Bildender Künstler der DDR (Association of Visual Artists in the GDR) as of 1967. Following her studies and initial freelance activities, she taught painting and graphic arts at the Kulturhaus Rüdersdorf near Berlin from 1970 to 1987. As of 1980 she also began creating numerous works of art on or connected with architecture.

In 1982 she moved to Lietzen, near Seelow, where she bought a farmstead and led courses in painting, graphics, and collage throughout the year as of 1983. That same year, at a celebration in Schwedt, she and the painter Johanna Görke collected signatures for the "Berliner Appell" written by the scientist Robert Havemann and the pastor Rainer Eppelmann. This document called for a laying a lasting basis for peace, with peace understood as more than the absence of war. The approximately 80 signers called on politicians to seek a substantial reduction in tension. As a result, she was summoned to appear before various party committees and the artists' association, and the state security (Staatssicherheit) launched proceedings against her. When friends of hers left the GDR, she was prohibited from exhibiting a series of portraits she had made of them. In 1988 she was part of a group at the 10th Conference of the Verband Bildender Künstler der DDR (Association of Visual Artists in the GDR) that authored a resolution against censorship of the Soviet magazine Sputnik.

After the unification of East and West Germany, she was a co-founder in 1991 of an association of women artists known as Endmoräne-Künstlerinnen aus Brandenburg und Berlin e.V. In the mid-1990s she became a member of GEDOK Brandenburg and of the Brandenburgischen Verband Bildender Künstlerinnen & Künstler e. V. (Brandenburg Association of Visual Artists). Erika Stürmer-Alex's works are in the Nationalgalerie (Berlin), the Museum Junge Kunst Frankfurt (Oder), the Brandenburgische Kunstsammlungen Cottbus, the Staatliche Kunstsammlungen Dresden, the University of Evansville Gallery (Indiana, USA) and in many private collections.

== Quote ==
"Erika Stürmer-Alex utilizes a variety of techniques to place herself constantly in the friction zones of reality, in order to test her own positions vis-a-vis general existential questions, to link a process-oriented element of existence with individual mythologies and thereby to develop a subjective idiom of signs. She examines everyday objects with deeper uncomfortable meanings, blends the visionary with aspects of the banal, and puts everything at her disposal at the center of our perception in provocative ways" (Herbert Schirmer)

== Exhibitions ==
Solo (selection)

1986 Rathausgalerie Fürstenwalde (GDR)

1989 Galerie in der Hochschule für Bildende Künste Dresden (GDR)

2013 Spiel ohne Grenzen - Malerei und Plastik 2003 bis 2013, Museum Junge Kunst, Rathaushalle & Festsaal Frankfurt-Oder (Germany); Galerie BWA Zielona Góra (Poland)

2018 Erika Stürmer-Alex: Zeitbrüche und Spielräume, Brandenburgisches Landesmuseum für moderne Kunst, Cottbus

Group Exhibitions (selection)

1967 VI. Deutsche Kunstausstellung, Dresden (GDR)

1998 POLITEIA - Szenarien aus der Deutschen Geschichte nach 1945 aus Frauensicht, Frauenmuseum Bonn

2008 Und jetzt. Künstlerinnen aus der DDR, Künstlerhaus Bethanien, Berlin

2017 Behind the Mask. Artists in the GDR, Museum Barberini, Potsdam

2018 Real Pop 1960-1985, Brandenburgisches Landesmuseum für moderne Kunst, Frankfurt-Oder

2018 The Medea Insurrection: Radical Women Artists behind the Iron Curtain, Staatliche Kunstsammlungen Dresden (Germany); Wende Museum (USA)

== Honors and awards ==
1992 Förderpreis des Landes Brandenburg

1993 Study period at the Villa Massimo, Rome

2001 Fellowship from the Stiftung Kulturfonds for the Künstlerhaus Schloss Wiepersdorf

2004 Ostbrandenburgischer Kunstpreis der Märkischen Oderzeitung

2015 Award from the Minister President of Brandenburg for her life's work
