= Willi Sitte =

German painter

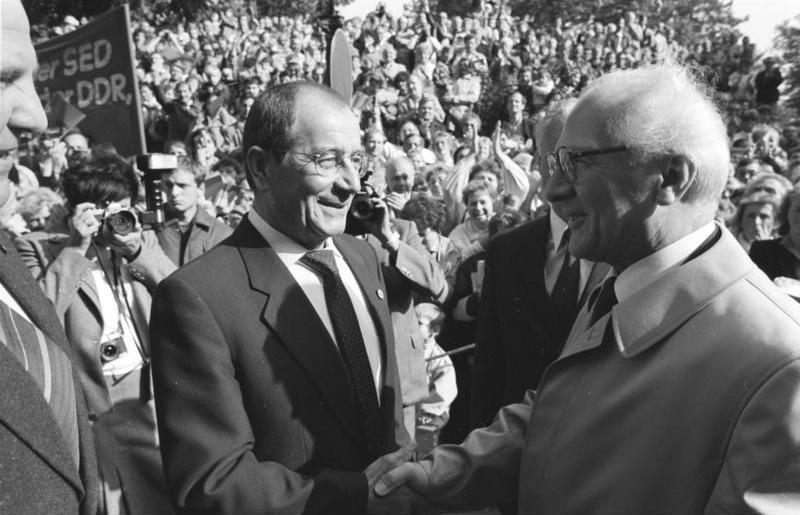
- Willi Sitte (center) with Erich Honecker at the opening of the 10th East German Art Exhibition
- Born: 28 February 1921; Kratzau, Bohemia, Czechoslovakia
- Died: 8 June 2013 (aged 92); Halle, Germany
- Occupation: Painter

Willi Sitte (28 February 1921 – 8 June 2013) was a German painter who was for a long time the president of the East German association of visual artists.
