= Werner Wittig (painter) =

German painter and engraver (1930–2013)

Werner Wittig (25 October 1930 in Chemnitz – 31 December 2013) was a German painter, engraver and printmaker. He won the Hans Theo Richter-Preis of the Sächsische Akademie der Künste in 2000.

== Life and work ==
After an apprenticeship and working as a baker in Chemnitz, Wittig lost his left hand in an accident in 1948, while the right hand was badly damaged. Besides retraining as an industrial clerk, he learned to paint and draw in evening classes at the Volkshochschule in Chemnitz from 1949. Sponsored by the director of the Chemnitz art collections, Friedrich Schreiber-Weigand, Wittig studied from 1952 to 1957 at the University of Fine Arts in Dresden with Erich Fraaß, Hans Theo Richter and Max Schwimmer. In 1957, Wittig became a member of the Association of Visual Artists of the GDR. From 1958 to 1961, he built the graphic workshop of the Association of Visual Artists in the Dresden district, which he also headed.

In 1970, Wittig had his first major solo exhibition with paintings and graphics in the art exhibition Kühl in Dresden. From that year, he worked on the technique of wood cracks, the colour variant of which he developed in the mid-1970s. He designed the first coloured copies in 1975. Especially with these coloured wood cracks "of up to seven printing blocks in as many colours", he is one of the "most renowned representatives of artist high pressure in Germany". An example is the coloured wood crack Am Wasser from 1999. Since around 1976, his main theme has been the combination of the genres landscape and still life. In that year he took part in the 7th International Triennial for Coloured Printmaking in Grenchen, Switzerland, and received the first prize for colour graphics of the GDR in Berlin; in the following year 1977, he reached 2nd price for colour graphics of the GDR with 100 selected graphics.

His first solo exhibition in the Federal Republic of Germany through the Döbele Gallery in Ravensburg was made possible in 1981. In 1985, he could travel to Italy. On his 60th birthday in 1990, Wittig exhibited again at the art exhibition Kühl in Dresden. Various other exhibitions have followed since then.

Werner Wittig lived and worked as a freelance painter and graphic artist in Radebeul from 1958 to 1961. He died there on New Year's Eve 2013.

== Awards ==
He has received numerous graphic awards, including:

- 1957: Max Pechstein Prize of the City of Zwickau for the lithographic cycle Die Frau im öffentlichen Leben
- 1959: Max Pechstein Prize of the City of Zwickau, combined with his first exhibition in the Zwickau City Museum
- 1976: 1st prize for colour graphics of the GDR, Berlin
- 1977: 2nd prize for colour graphics of the GDR, Berlin
- 2000: Hans-Theo-Richter-Prize of the Saxon Academy of the Arts
- 2000: Art Prize of the large district town of Radebeul

== Works ==
Works by Werner Wittig are in numerous public collections, such as:

- Albstadt (Gallery Albstadt)
- Berlin (Academy of Arts)
- Bremen (Art Gallery)
- Dresden (Kupferstichkabinett, Städtische Galerie Dresden)
- Krakow / Poland (State Art Collection)
- Reutlingen (Municipal Art Museum Spendhaus Reutlingen)
- Rostock (Art Gallery)
- Skopje / Macedonia (State Art Collection)
- Stuttgart (State Gallery / Graphic Collection)
- Chemnitz (Chemnitz Art Collections / Graphic Collection)

== Literature ==
- Gert Claussnitzer: Werner Wittig. Maler und Werk. Verlag der Kunst, Dresden 1973.
- Georg Reinhardt (Ed.): Werner Wittig – Die Holzrisse. Verzeichnis der Holzrisse 1956–2000. Dresden 2000.
- Municipal Art Museum Spendhaus Reutlingen / Municipal Gallery Dresden (Ed.): Stille. Holzrisse und Gemälde von Werner Wittig. Reutlingen 2008, ISBN 978-3-939775-02-7
- Wolfgang Zimmermann: „Ein kühler Morgen zwischen den Jahren“; Werner Wittig und Michael Hofmann stellen in den Räumen der Sparkasse aus. In: Radebeuler monthly books e. V. (Ed.): Vorschau & Rückblick; Monatsheft für Radebeul und Umgebung. January 2014, p. 8 f. (Online - with a colour woodcut by the artist).
