= Dieter Goltzsche =

German painter and graphic designer

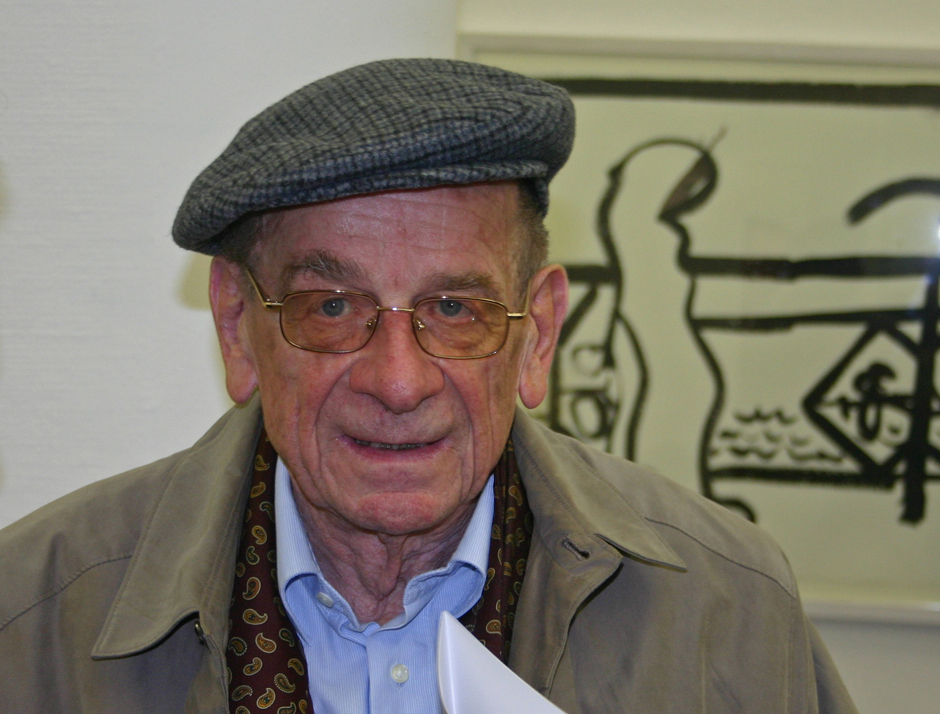
Dieter Goltzsche, 2014

Dieter Goltzsche (born 1934 in Dresden) is a German painter and graphic designer. He won the Hans-Theo-Richter-Preis of the Sächsische Akademie der Künste in 2010.

== Exhibitions (selection) ==
- 1964 Kunstkabinett des Instituts für Lehrerweiterbildung, Berlin
- 1967 Leonhardi-Museum, Dresden
- 1968 Galerie im Turm, Berlin; Wort und Werk, Leipzig; Städtische Kunstsammlungen, Görlitz
- 1982 Altes Museum, Berlin; Galerie Schmidt-Rottluff, Karl-Marx-Stadt; Kupferstichkabinett Berlin; Berlin State Museums
- 1985 Galerie im Cranachhaus, Weimar
- 1986 Galerie Oben, Karl-Marx-Stadt
- 1988 Galerie der Deutschen Bücherstube, Berlin
- 1989 galerie erph, Erfurt
- 1990 Galerie Oevermann, Frankfurt am Main
- 1991 Galerie Mitte, Berlin; Galerie Beethovenstraße, Düsseldorf
- 1992 Käthe Kollwitz Museum, Cologne; Kunstmuseum Basel; Neue Pinakothek, Munich, with Gerhard Altenbourg, Carlfriedrich Claus, Sabina Grzimek, Claus Weidensdorfer and Peter Graf
- 1993 Brecht-Haus Weißensee, Berlin
- 1994 Galerie Beethovenstraße, Düsseldorf; Galerie der Berliner Graphikpresse, Berlin
- 1998 Neuer Berliner Kunstverein, Berlin
- 2000 Galerie Beethovenstraße, Düsseldorf; Galerie Brusberg, Berlin; Academy of Arts, Berlin
- 2004 Leonhardi-Museum, Dresden; Galerie Parterre, Berlin

== Honours and awards ==
- 1978 Käthe Kollwitz Prize by the Akademie der Künste der DDR
- 1989 Art Prize of the German Democratic Republic
- 1990 Member of the Academy of Arts, Berlin
- 1998 Hannah-Höch-Prize by the city of Berlin
- 2010 Hans-Theo-Richter-Prize by the Sächsische Akademie der Künste

== See also ==
- List of German painters
