= Sächsische Akademie der Künste =

German cultural organisation

Coordinates: 51°3′39.151″N 13°44′22.618″E

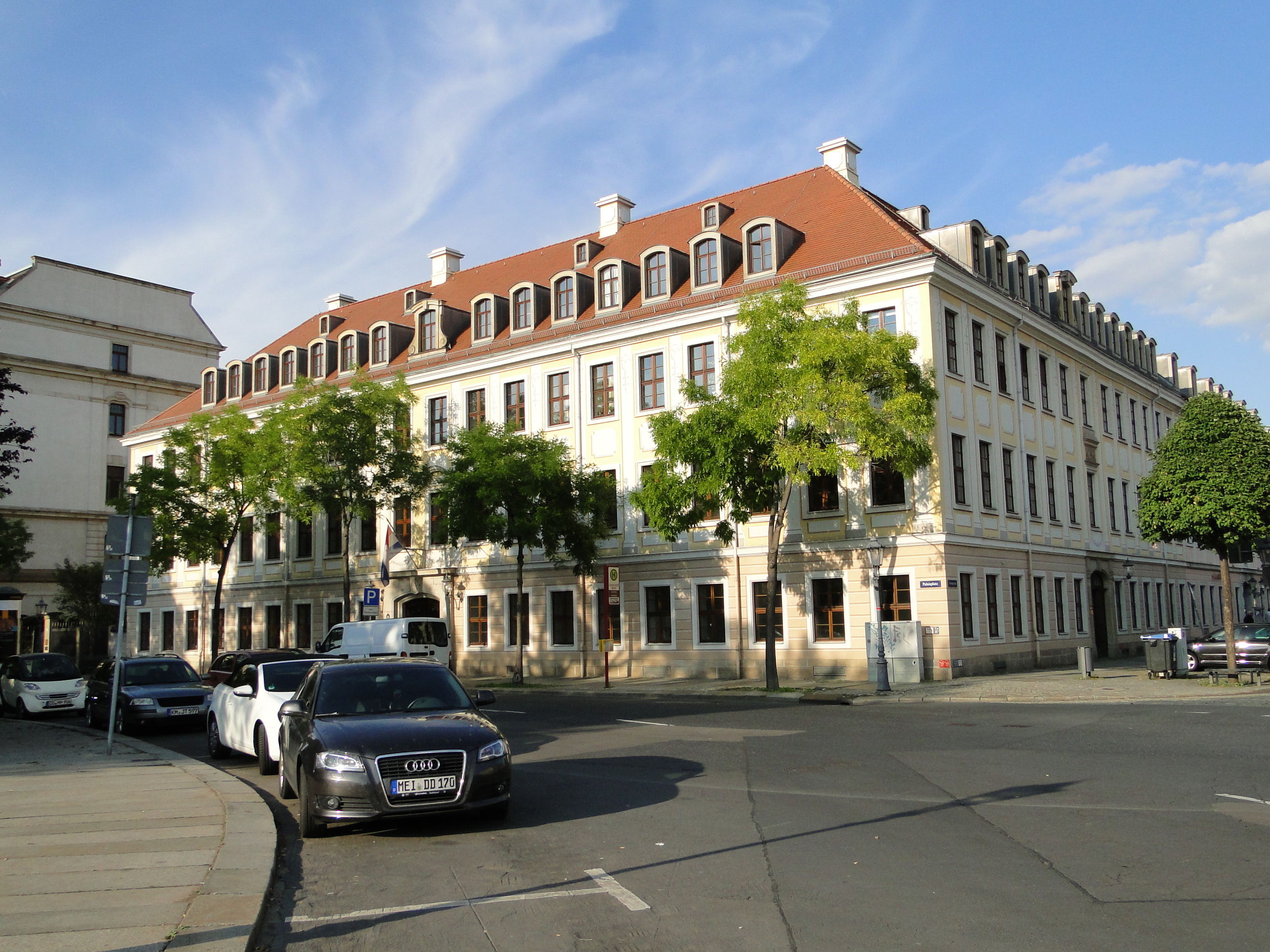
Headquarters of the Academy at Palaisplatz 3 in Dresden, September 2012

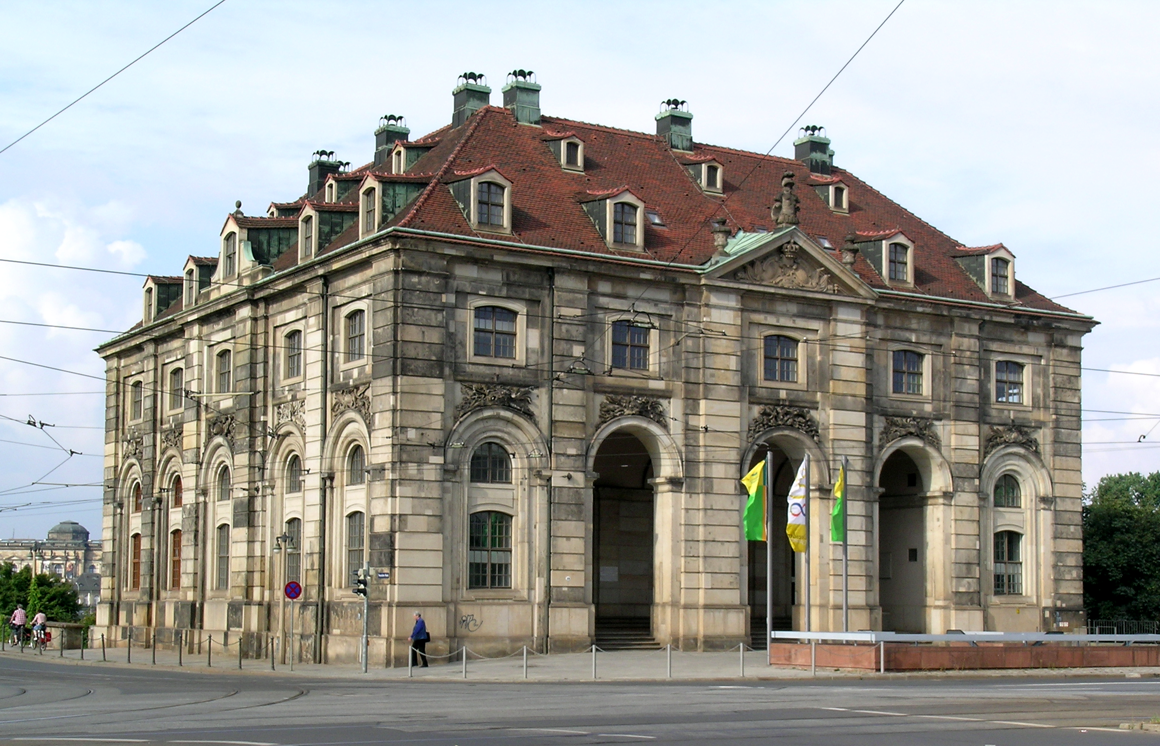
Former seat of the academy in the Dresden Blockhaus

The Sächsische Akademie der Künste (Saxon Academy of Arts) is a German cultural organisation for the state of Saxony, based in Dresden.

== Purpose ==
The Academy is a statutory corporation to promote the arts in Saxony, make proposals for its promotion and maintain the traditions of the Saxon cultural area ("die Kunst zu fördern, Vorschläge zu ihrer Förderung zu machen und die Überlieferungen des sächsischen Kulturraums zu pflegen", Founding Act of 1994). Situated between the older academies in Berlin and Munich, the academy tries to enliven the intellectual and artistic richness of the East German cultural area, while simultaneously meeting the challenges associated with demographic, social and cultural changes. In immediate vicinity of the new member states of the European Union and historical leadership of Saxony in the Central and Eastern European cultural area, the Academy feels obliged to accompany the political unification culturally and artistically.

== History ==
The initiative for the establishment of the academy came from a group of founders, which after 1990 included the publicist and essayist Friedrich Dieckmann, the sculptor Wieland Förster, the musician Ludwig Güttler, the actor Frederick William Young and the art historian Werner Schmidt. After preparation of foundation law and the statutes, the Saxon State Parliament adopted on 27 May 1994, the "Gesetz über die Errichtung der Sächsischen Akademie der Künste" (Law on the establishment of the Saxon Academy of Arts). It was constituted on 29 February 1996 with 30 founding members. As of October 2018, the academy has 172 members from Germany and abroad.

The academy is organised in five sections, architecture, arts, performing arts and film, literature and language, and music.

== Awards ==
=== Hans-Theo-Richter-Preis ===
The Hans-Theo-Richter-Preis (Hans Theo Richter Prize) for art was founded by the widow of Hans Theo Richter and has been award biennially, endowed with 20,000 euro.

- 1998 Max Uhlig, Dresden
- 1999 Jiří Kolář, Prag
- 2000 Paula Ribariu, Bukarest und Werner Wittig, Radebeul
- 2001 Peter Graf, Dresden
- 2003 Thomas Ranft, Chemnitz
- 2005 Lutz Fleischer, Dresden
- 2007 Wolfram Adalbert Scheffler, Berlin
- 2010 Dieter Goltzsche, Berlin
- 2012 Hanns Schimansky, Berlin
- 2014 Claus Weidensdorfer, Radebeul
- 2017 Marlene Dumas, Kapstadt/Amsterdam

=== Gottfried-Semper-Architekturpreis ===
The prize for architecture is named after Gottfried Semper and has been awarded biennially, endowed with 25,000 euro.

- 2007: Erich Schneider-Wessling
- 2009: Günter Pfeifer, Freiburg im Breisgau
- 2011: Frank Zimmermann, Cottbus
- 2013: Louisa Hutton and Matthias Sauerbruch (Sauerbruch Hutton)
- 2015: Undine Giseke
