= Wolfgang Weyrauch =

German writer, journalist and actor

- Born: 15 October 1904; Königsberg, Prussia
- Died: November 7, 1980 (aged 76)
- Occupations: Writer, journalist, and actor

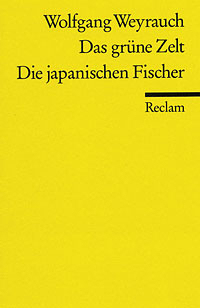
Book cover of Wolfgang Weyrauch "Das grune Zelt. Die japanischen Fischer" 1963

Wolfgang Weyrauch (15 October 1904 – 7 November 1980) was a German writer, journalist, and actor. He wrote under the pseudonym name Joseph Scherer.

== Life and work ==
Wolfgang Weyrauch was born Königsberg, Prussia as the son of a surveyor. After attending gymnasium, and receiving his Abitur, he began going to acting school in Frankfurt am Main in 1924. Between 1925 and 1927, he acted in theaters in Münster, Bochum, and at the Harztheater in Thale. From 1927 to 1929, Weyrauch pursued German history, German studies, and Romance studies at Goethe University Frankfurt.

In 1929, he began working as a freelance writer, from 1929 to 1933, at the Frankfurter Zeitung, from 1932 to 1938, at the Berliner Tageblatt, and, from 1933 to 1934, at the Vossische Zeitung. In the 1930s, Weyrauch also began to write radio plays, a newly emerged art form. During the 1930s, Weyrauch also worked as a literary editor, and published his first books. From 1940 to 1945, he worked in a Nazi German air intelligence unit in World War II. He was a Obergefreiter (Corporal) in the Luftnachrichteneinheit (Air Intelligence/Air Signalling). In 1945, he was held in a Soviet prisoner of war camp, and was released in the same year.

After 1945, Weyrauch wrote radio plays, and narratives, and published numerous anthologies (see list below). From December 1945 to 1948, Weyrauch was the editor of Ulenspiegel, a satirical magazine, and Ost und West, both published in Berlin. He shaped the direction of "Kahlschlagliteratur" in Tausend Gramm, a 1949 anthology edited by him, characterizing and promoting the rebirth of German literature, after the end of the Third Reich. From 1950 to 1958, he was a literary editor at the Hamburg publisher, Rowohlt Verlag. Beginning in 1959, he returned to freelance writing, first in Gauting, near Munich, and in Darmstadt, after 1967.

Weyrauch was a member of the West German P.E.N., and the German Writers' Union. In 1951, he began taking part in Gruppe 47 conferences, and, in 1967, he became a member of the Deutsche Akademie für Sprache und Dichtung in Darmstadt, where he died.

== Awards and honors ==
In 1997, the city of Darmstadt created the Wolfgang Weyrauch Prize to encourage young writers with an award, and stipend. The stipend is in the amount of €8,000. During his lifetime, Weyrauch himself was awarded several prizes.

- 1962 Hörspielpreis der Kriegsblinden
- 1972 Johann Heinrich Merck Ehrung, City of Darmstadt
- 1973 Andreas Gryphius Prize
- 1979 Ehrengabe des Kulturkreises im Bundesverband der Deutschen Industrie

== Works ==
General

- Der Main, Berlin 1934
- Strudel und Quell, Berlin 1938
- Ein Band für die Nacht, Leipzig 1939
- Eine Inselgeschichte, Berlin 1939
- Das Liebespaar, Leipzig 1943
- Auf der bewegten Erde, Berlin 1946
- Von des Glücks Barmherzigkeit, Berlin 1946
- Die Liebenden, Munich 1947
- Die Davidsbündler, Hamburg u.a. 1948
- Lerche und Sperber, Munich 1948
- An die Wand geschrieben, Hamburg 1950
- Bitte meiner älteren Tochter, Wien u.a. 1952
- Die Feuersbrunst, Karlsruhe 1952
- Bericht an die Regierung, Frankfurt a. M. 1953
- Die Minute des Negers, Hamburg 1953
- Gesang um nicht zu sterben, Hamburg 1956
- Nie trifft die Finsternis, Berlin 1956
- Anabasis, Hamburg 1959
- Mein Schiff, das heißt Taifun, Olten u.a. 1959
- Das Jahr (radio drama), München 1961
- Die japanischen Fischer, Weinheim 1961
- Dialog mit dem Unsichtbaren, Olten u.a. 1962
- Das grüne Zelt. Die japanischen Fischer, Stuttgart 1963
- Die Spur, Olten u.a. 1963
- Dialog über neue deutsche Lyrik, Itzehoe-Vosskate 1965
- Komm (radio drama), München 1965
- Das erste Haus hieß Frieden, Munich 1966
- Etwas geschieht, Olten u.a. 1966
- Unterhaltungen von Fußgängern, Munich 1966
- Geschichten zum Weiterschreiben, Neuwied u.a. 1969
- Flug über Franken und Hessen, Braunschweig 1970
- Ein Clown sagt, Weinheim 1971
- Wie geht es Ihnen?, Neuwied u.a. 1971
- Mit dem Kopf durch die Wand, Darmstadt 1972
- Das Ende von Frankfurt am Main, Stuttgart 1973
- Gedichte, Darmstadt 1974
- Beinahe täglich, Darmstadt u.a. 1975
- Lieber T., Düsseldorf 1976
- Das Komma danach, Pfaffenweiler 1977
- 2 Litaneien, Dreieich 1977
- Fußgänger, B-Ebene, Hauptwache, Rolltreppe, hinauf, hinab, Frankfurt am Main 1978
- Hans Dumm, Köln u.a. 1978
- Ein Schluck von Vernunft, Darmstadt 1978
- Blickpunkt Darmstadt, Darmstadt 1979
- Ein Gedicht, was ist das?, Hannover 1980 (with Fritz Deppert)
- Epilog für Darmstadt, Darmstadt 1981
- Anders wär's besser, Würzburg 1982
- Zeugnisse & Zeugen, Büdingen 1982
- Dreimal geköpft, Assenheim 1983
- Proust beginnt zu brennen, Frankfurt am Main 1985
- Atom und Aloe, Frankfurt 1987
- Lebenslauf (radio drama), Dreieich 1988
- Das war überall, Darmstadt 1998

Translations

- Jehanne Jean Charles: Schrei, wenn du kannst, Bonn 1960 (with Margot Weyrauch)

Edited and published

- 1940, Berlin 1940
- Das Berlin-Buch, Leipzig 1941
- Die Pflugschar, Berlin 1947
- Lesebuch für Erwachsene, Lorch, Württemberg and others 1948
- Tausend Gramm, Hamburg and others 1949
- Expeditionen, Munich 1959
- Ich lebe in der Bundesrepublik, Munich 1960
- Alle diese Straßen, Munich 1965
- Lyrik aus dieser Zeit 1965/66, Esslingen 1965 (with Johannes Poethen)
- Ausnahmezustand, Munich 1966
- Unser ganzes Leben, Munich 1966 (with Geno Hartlaub, Martin Gregor-Dellin, Heinz Piontek, and Heinrich Vormweg)
- Federlese, München 1967 (with Benno Reifenberg)
- Lyrik aus dieser Zeit 1967/68, Munich and others 1967 (with Johannes Poethen)
- 11 Autoren über 1 Jahrzehnt, Berlin 1970
- Von Darmstadt nach Darmstadt, Darmstadt 1972 (with Fritz Deppert)
- Das Kellerbuch, Darmstadt 1973
- Neue Expeditionen, Munich 1975
- Vom Fischer und seiner Frau, Weinheim 1976 (with Hans-Joachim Gelberg and Willi Glasauer)
- Kalenderbuch, Köln 1977
- Das Lächeln meines Großvaters und andere Familiengeschichten, Düsseldorf 1978
- Aufschlüsse, Modautal-Neunkirchen 1978
- Liebeserklärungen, Darmstadt 1978 (with Fritz Deppert)
- Liebesgeschichten (radio drama), Gütersloh 1979
- Literarischer März, Munich 1979 (with Fritz Deppert and Karl Krolow)
- Mein Gedicht ist die Welt, Frankfurt am Main
  - Vol. 1. 1780 bis 1912, 1982
  - Vol. 2. 1912 bis 1982, 1982

== Sources ==
- Irmela Schneider (Ed.): Zu den Hörspielen Wolfgang Weyrauchs. Siegen 1981.
- Ulrike Landzettel: "Mein Gedicht ist mein Messer". Darmstadt 1991.
- Ulrike Landzettel: "Wolfgang Weyrauch". In Kritisches Lexikon zur deutschsprachigen Gegenwartsliteratur. Edited by Heinz Ludwig Arnold. 56. Nachlieferung. text + kritik, Munich 1997.
- Ulrike Landzettel: Identifikationen eines Eckenstehers. Der Schriftsteller Wolfgang Weyrauch (1904-1980). Dissertation an der Universität Marburg 2003.
- Werner Bellmann: "Wolfgang Weyrauch: 'Uni'." In Deutsche Kurzprosa der Gegenwart. Interpretationen. Edited by W.B. und Christine Hummel. Reclam, Stuttgart 2006. pp. 85–93.
