= Rostock =

Largest city in Mecklenburg-Vorpommern, Germany

- City
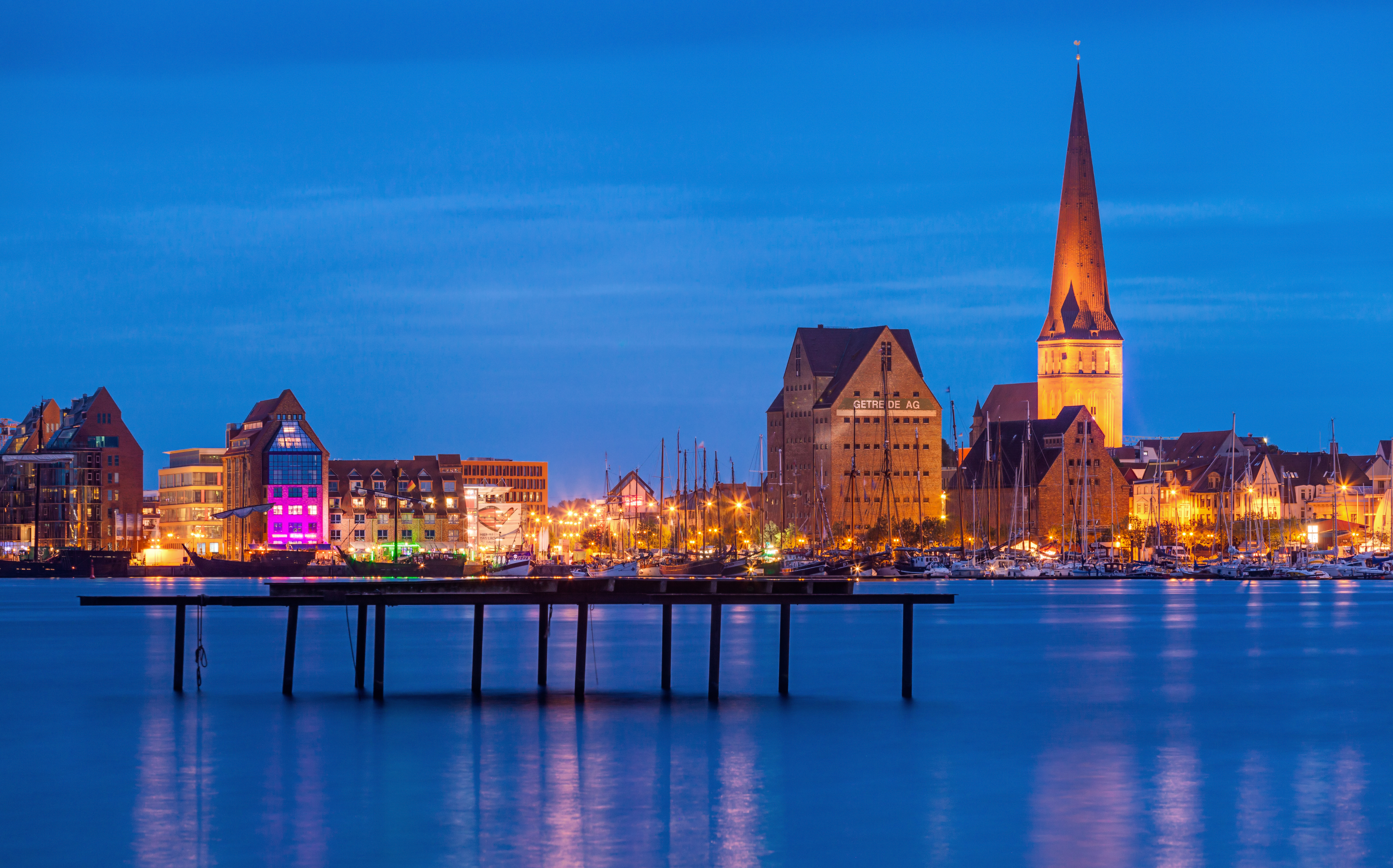
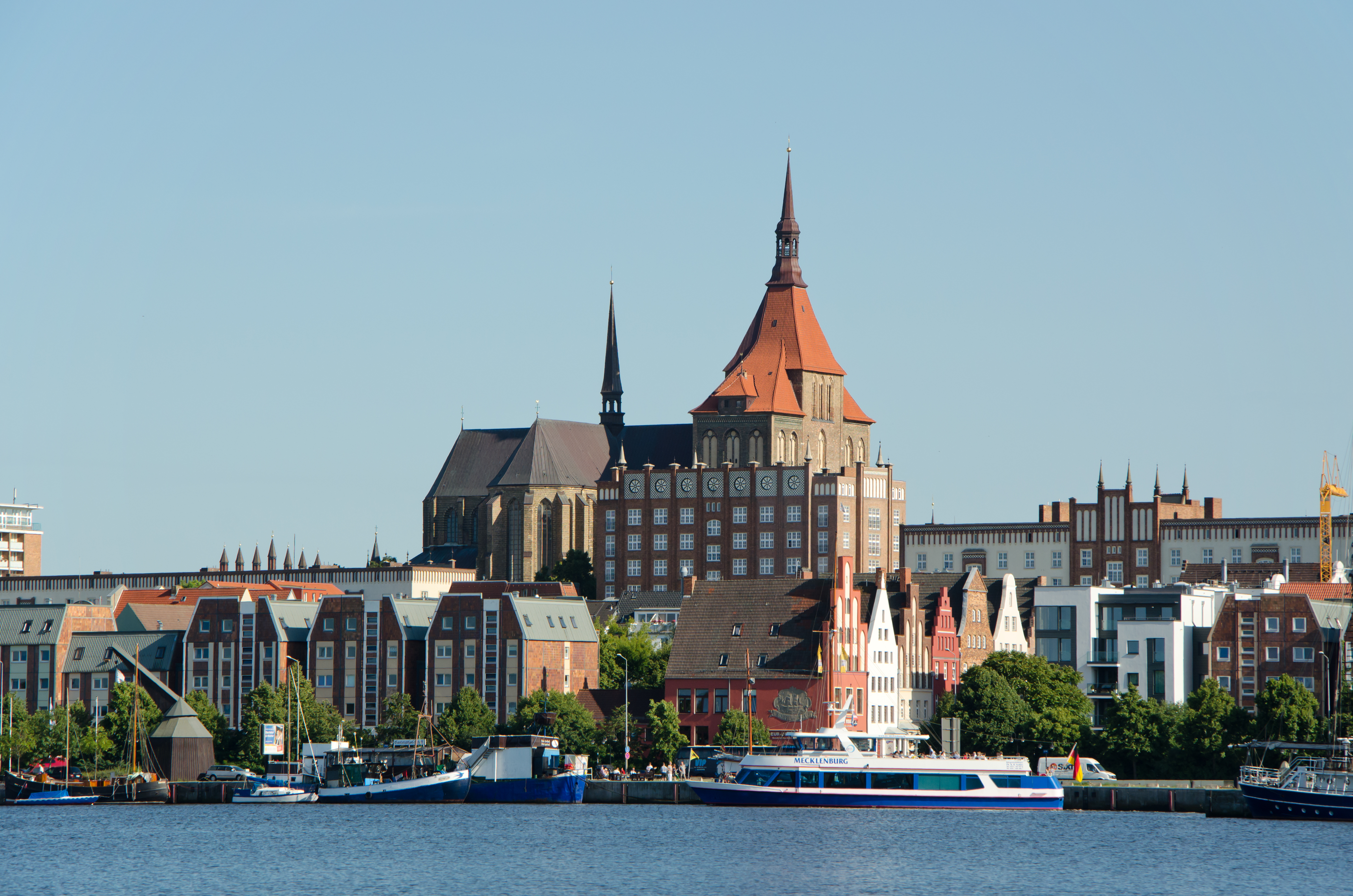
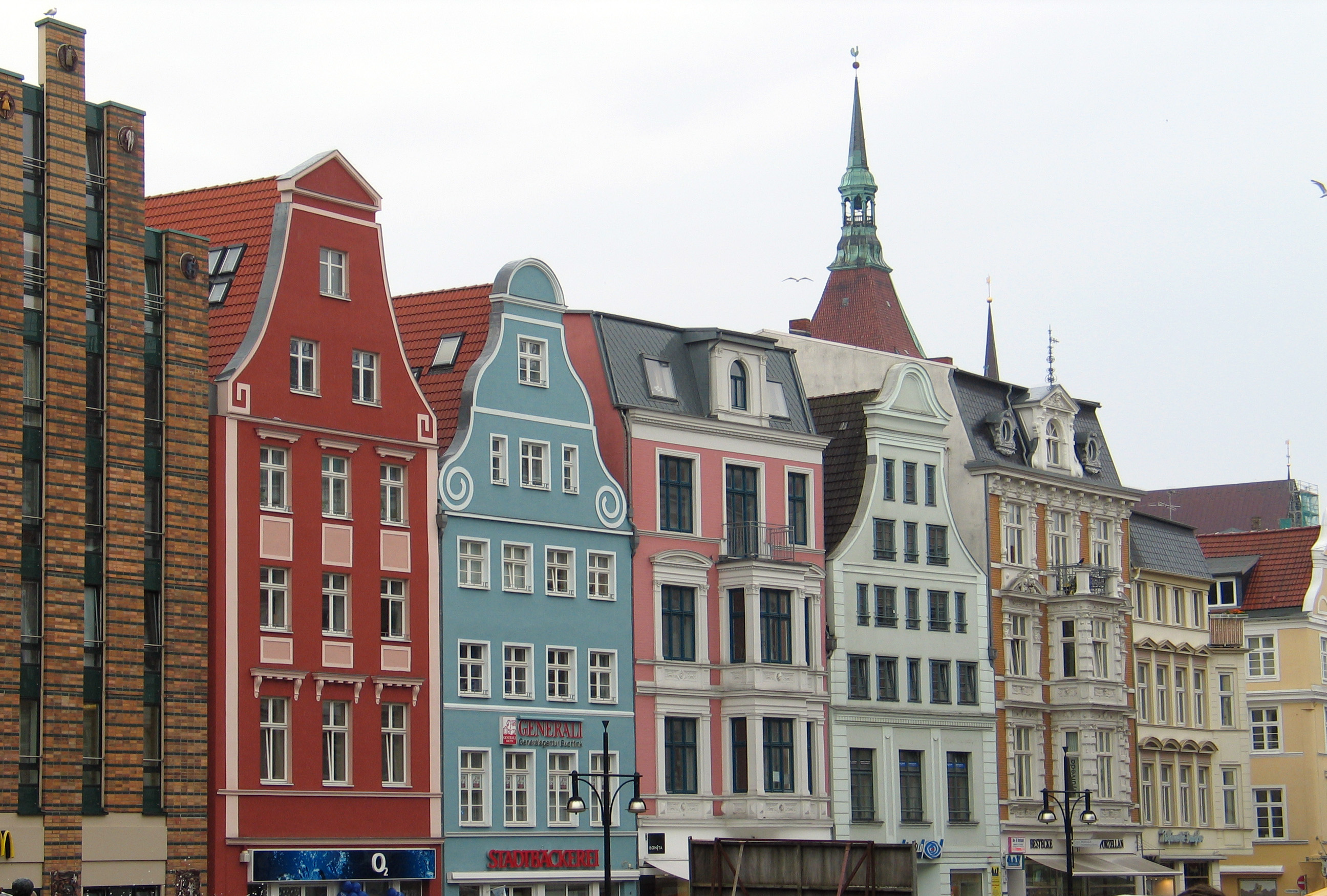
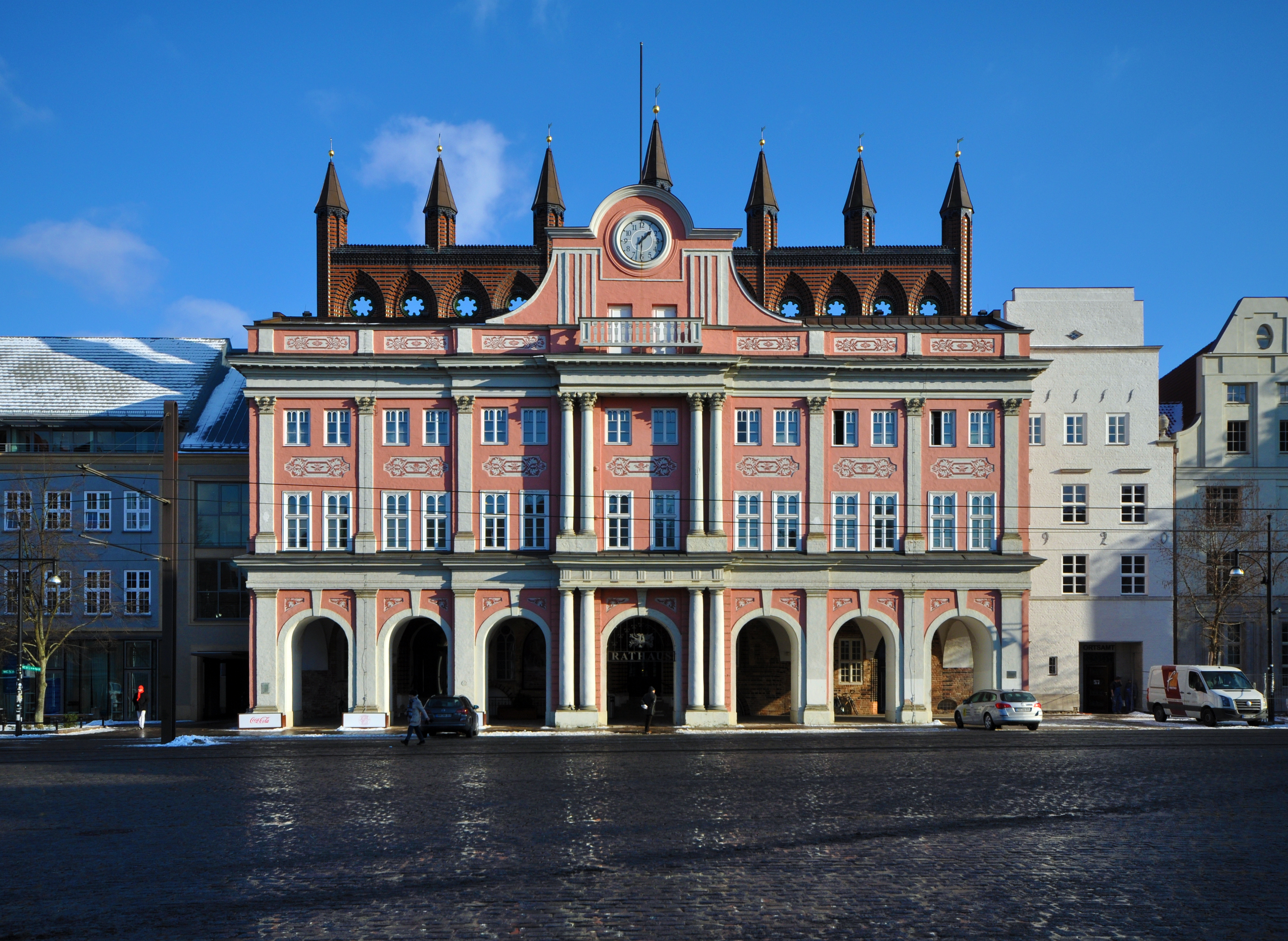
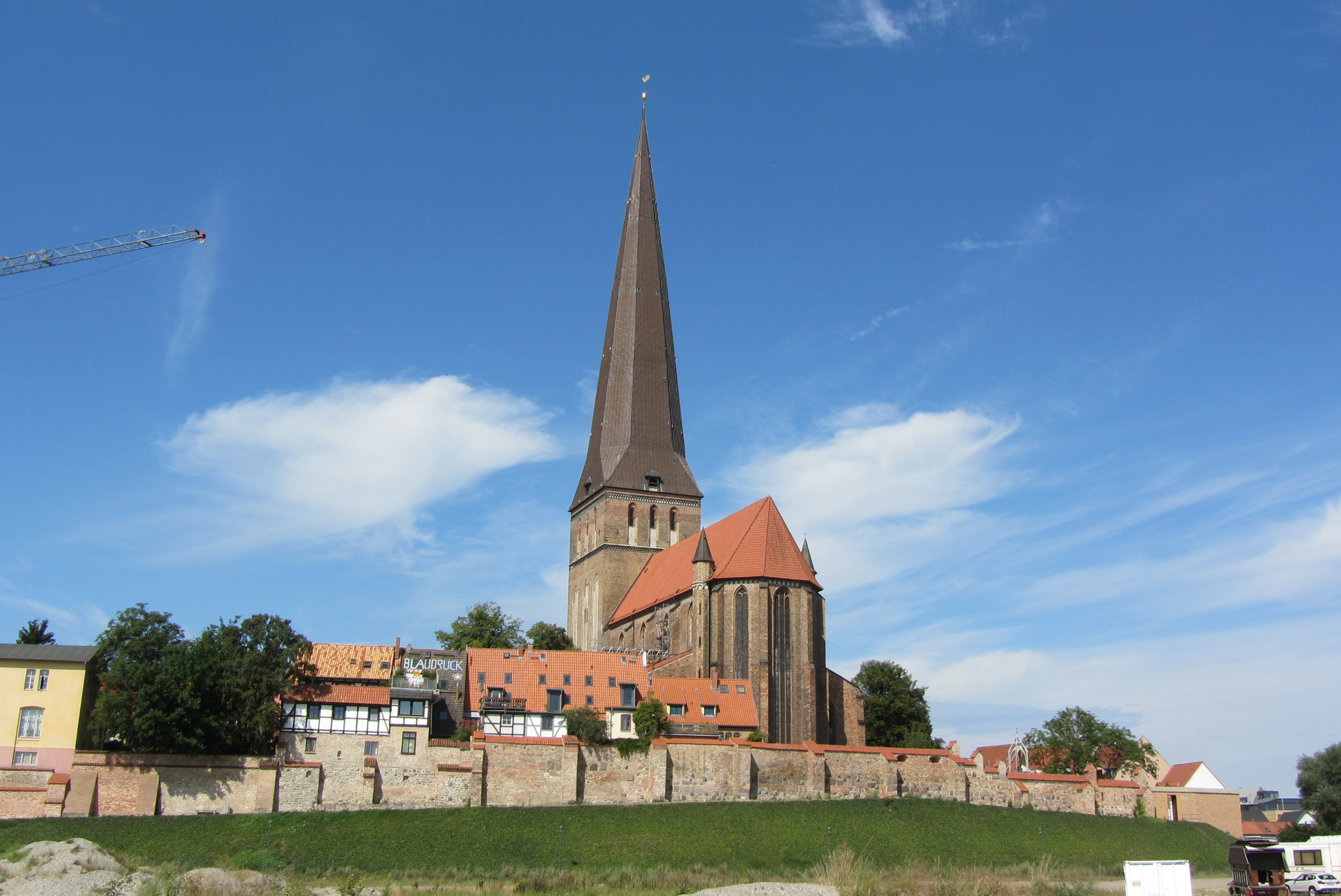
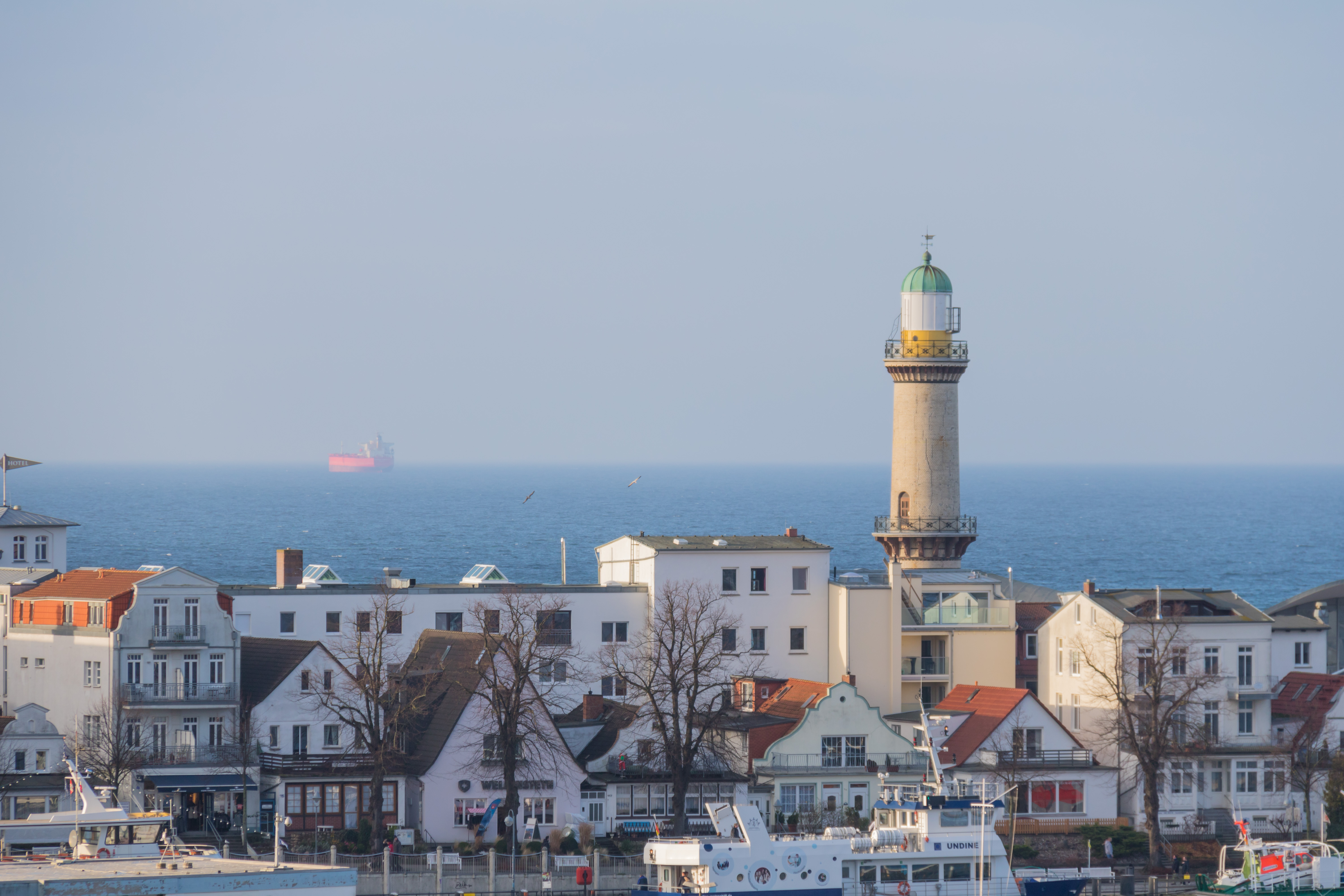
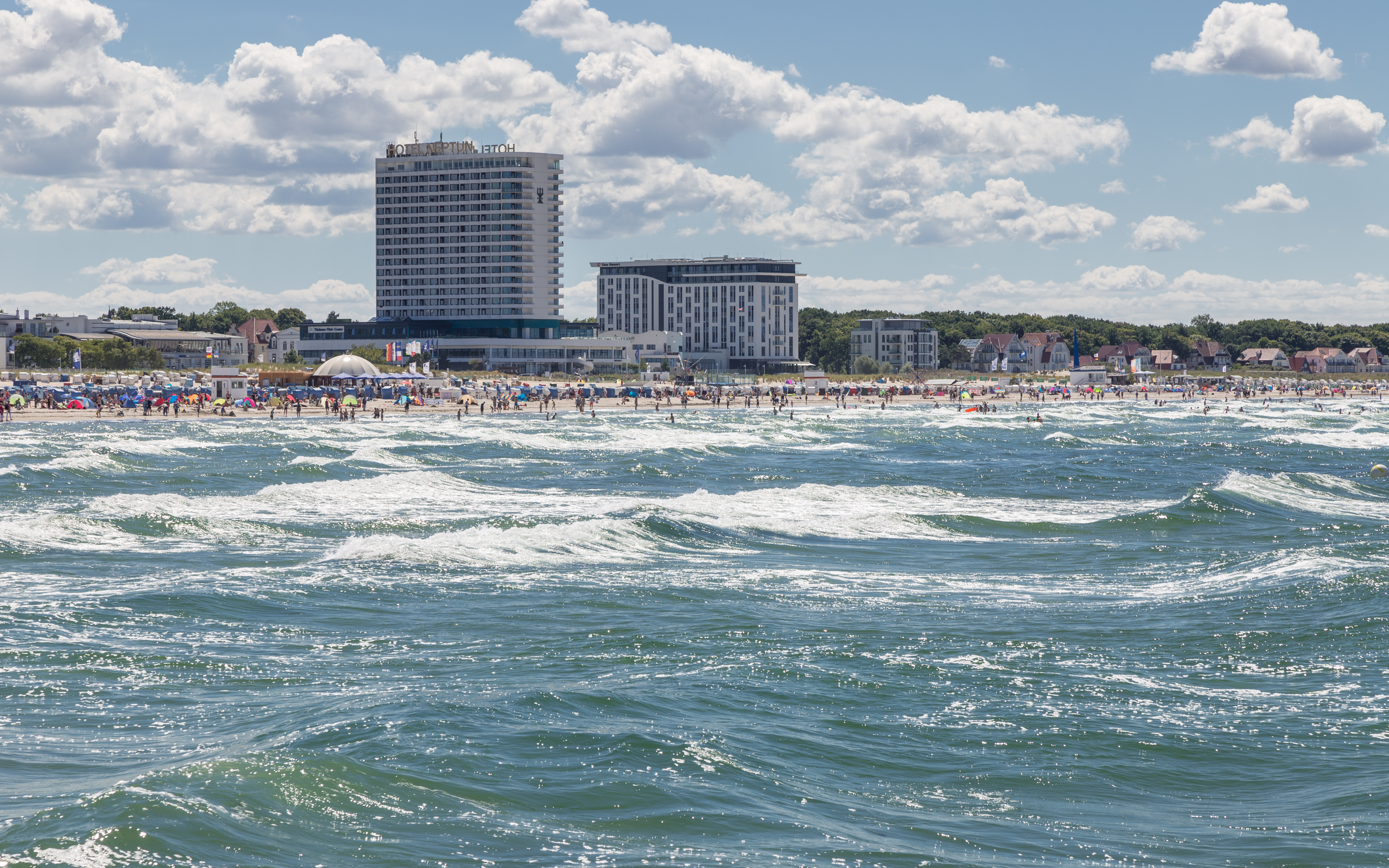
- View across the Lower Warnow St. Mary's Church Kröpeliner Straße City Hall St. Peter's Church Warnemünde Lighthouse Beach of Warnemünde

- Flag Coat of arms

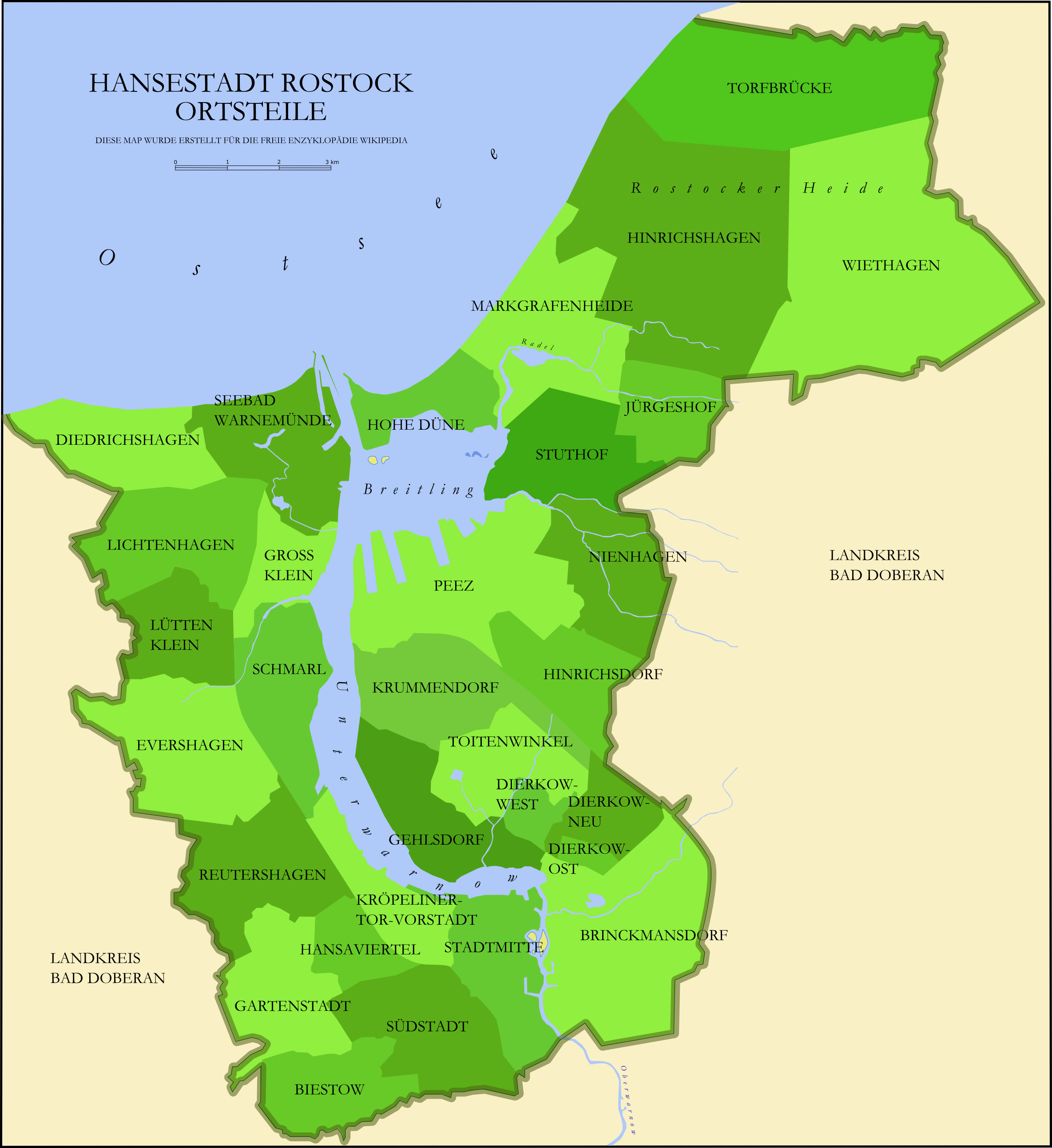
- Administrative divisions of Rostock
- Interactive map of Rostock
- Location within Germany Location within Mecklenburg-Vorpommern
- Coordinates: 54°5′N 12°8′E
- Country: Germany
- State: Mecklenburg-Vorpommern
- District: Urban district
- Subdivisions: 21 boroughs

Government
  - Mayor (2023–30): Eva-Maria Kröger (Left)

Area
  - Total: 181.44 km^{2} (70.05 sq mi)
- Elevation: 13 m (43 ft)

Population (2025-12-31)
  - Total: 204,929
  - Density: 1,129.5/km^{2} (2,925.3/sq mi)
- Time zone: UTC+01:00 (CET)
  - Summer (DST): UTC+02:00 (CEST)
- Postal codes: 18001–18147
- Dialling codes: 0381
- Vehicle registration: HRO
- Website: rostock.de

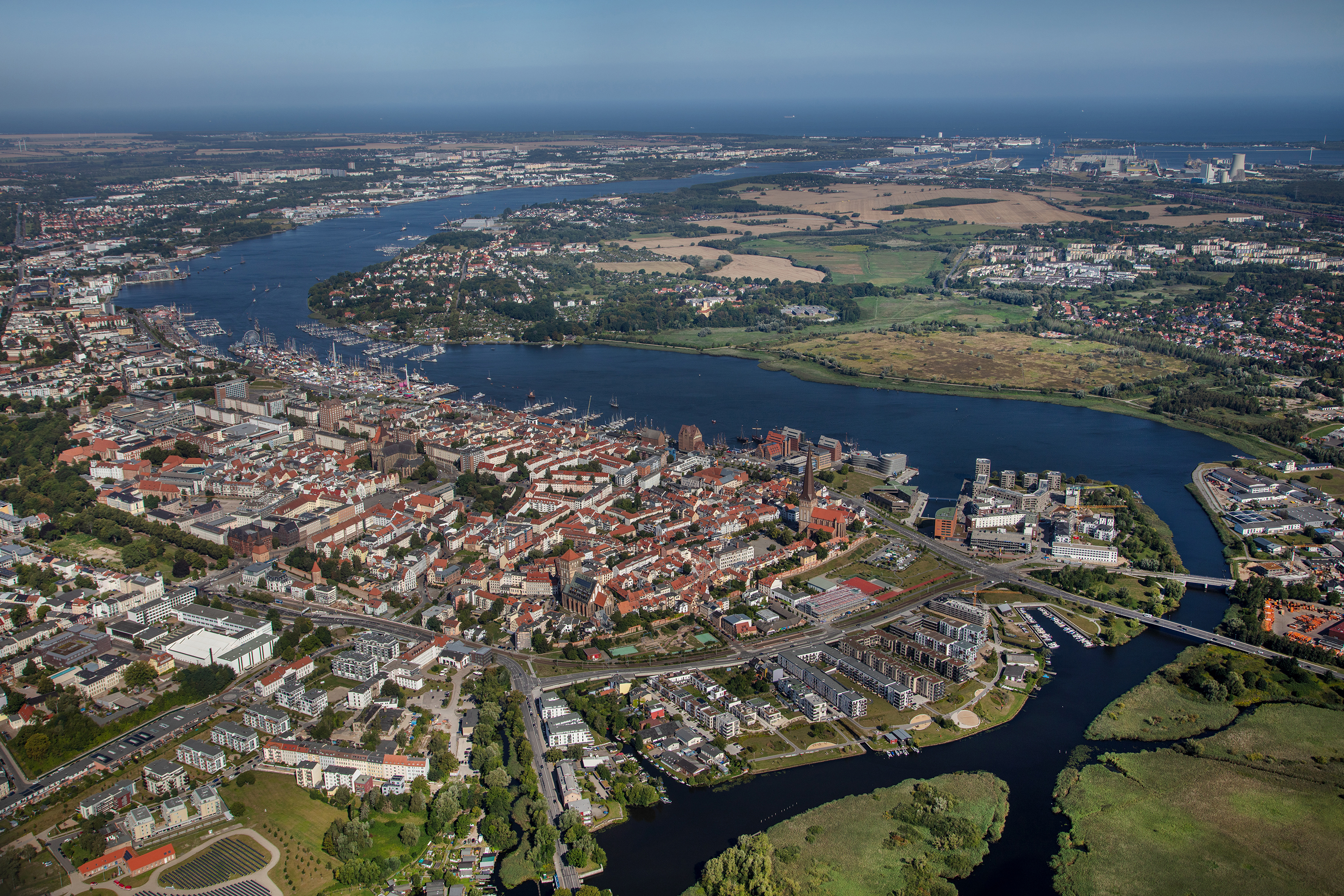
Rostock

Rostock (/ˈrɒstɒk/ ROS-tok; German: [ˈʁɔstɔk]), officially the Hanseatic and University City of Rostock (German: Hanse- und Universitätsstadt Rostock), is the largest city in the German state of Mecklenburg-Western Pomerania and lies in the Mecklenburgian part of the state, close to the border with Pomerania. (Note: Closest border point with Pomerania from Rostock in Ribnitz-Damgarten between Ribnitz (Mecklenburg) and Damgarten (Pomerania). Border constituted by River Recknitz.) With around 210,000 inhabitants, it is the third-largest city on the German Baltic coast after Kiel and Lübeck, the eighth-largest city in the area of former East Germany, as well as the 39th-largest city of Germany. Rostock was the largest coastal and most important port city in East Germany.

Rostock stands on the estuary of the River Warnow into the Bay of Mecklenburg of the Baltic Sea. The city stretches for about 16 km (10 mi) along the river. The river flows into the sea in the very north of the city, between the boroughs of Warnemünde and Hohe Düne. The city center lies further upstream, in the very south of the city. Most of Rostock's inhabitants live on the western side of the Warnow; the area east of the river is dominated by the port, industrial estates, and the forested Rostock Heath. The city's coastline east and west of the river mouth is relatively undeveloped, with long sandy beaches prevailing. The name of the city is of Slavic origin.

Rostock is the economic center of Mecklenburg-Western Pomerania and the state's only regiopolis (a city outside the core of a metropolitan area). The port of Rostock is the fourth largest port in Germany after the North Sea ports of Hamburg, Bremen/Bremerhaven, and Wilhelmshaven, and the largest port on the German Baltic coast. The ferry routes linking Rostock to Gedser in Denmark and to Trelleborg in Southern Sweden are among the busiest between Germany and Scandinavia. Rostock–Laage Airport lies in a rural region southeast of the city.

The city is home to the oldest university in the Baltic region and one of the oldest universities in the world, the University of Rostock, founded in 1419. The university's hospital, Universitätsmedizin Rostock, is one of two university hospitals in the state, along with Universitätsmedizin Greifswald of the University of Greifswald in Western Pomerania.

== History ==
=== Early history ===
In the 11th century Polabian Slavs founded a settlement at the Warnow river called Roztoc (*ras-tokŭ, Slavic for "fork of a river", it was also preserved in the name of the Moscow district Rostokino); the name Rostock is derived from that designation.

The Danish king Valdemar I set the town on fire in 1161. Afterwards the place was settled by German traders. Initially there were three separate cities:

- Altstadt (Old Town) around the Alter Markt (Old Market), which had St. Petri (St. Peter's Church),
- Mittelstadt (Middle Town) around the Neuer Markt (New Market), with St. Marien (St. Mary's Church) and

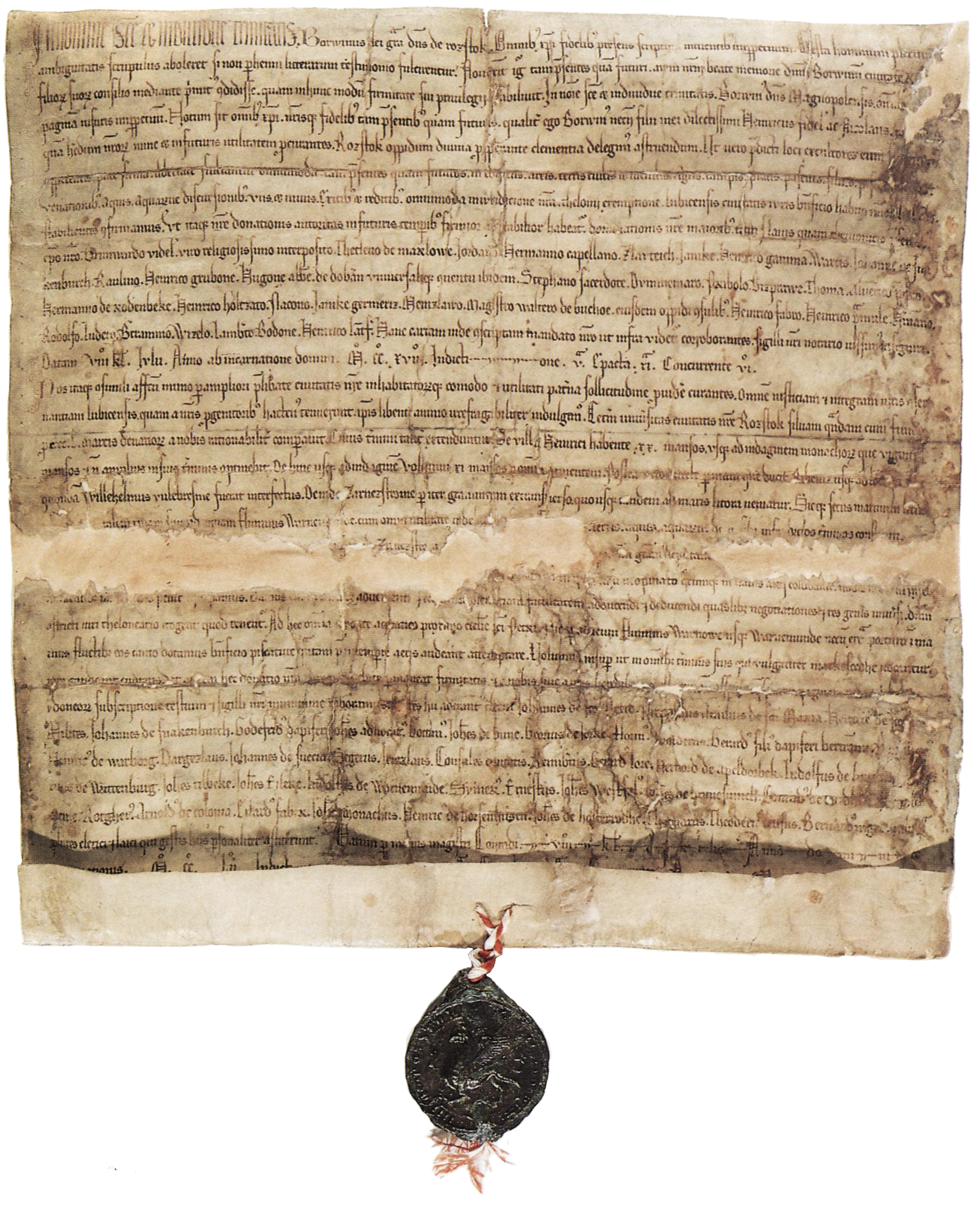
Confirmation of Lübeck law city rights, 1218

- Neustadt (New Town) around the Hopfenmarkt (Hop Market, now University Square), with St. Jakobi (St. James's Church, demolished after World War II).

In 1218, Rostock was granted Lübeck law city rights by Heinrich Borwin, prince of Mecklenburg.

=== Hanseatic League ===
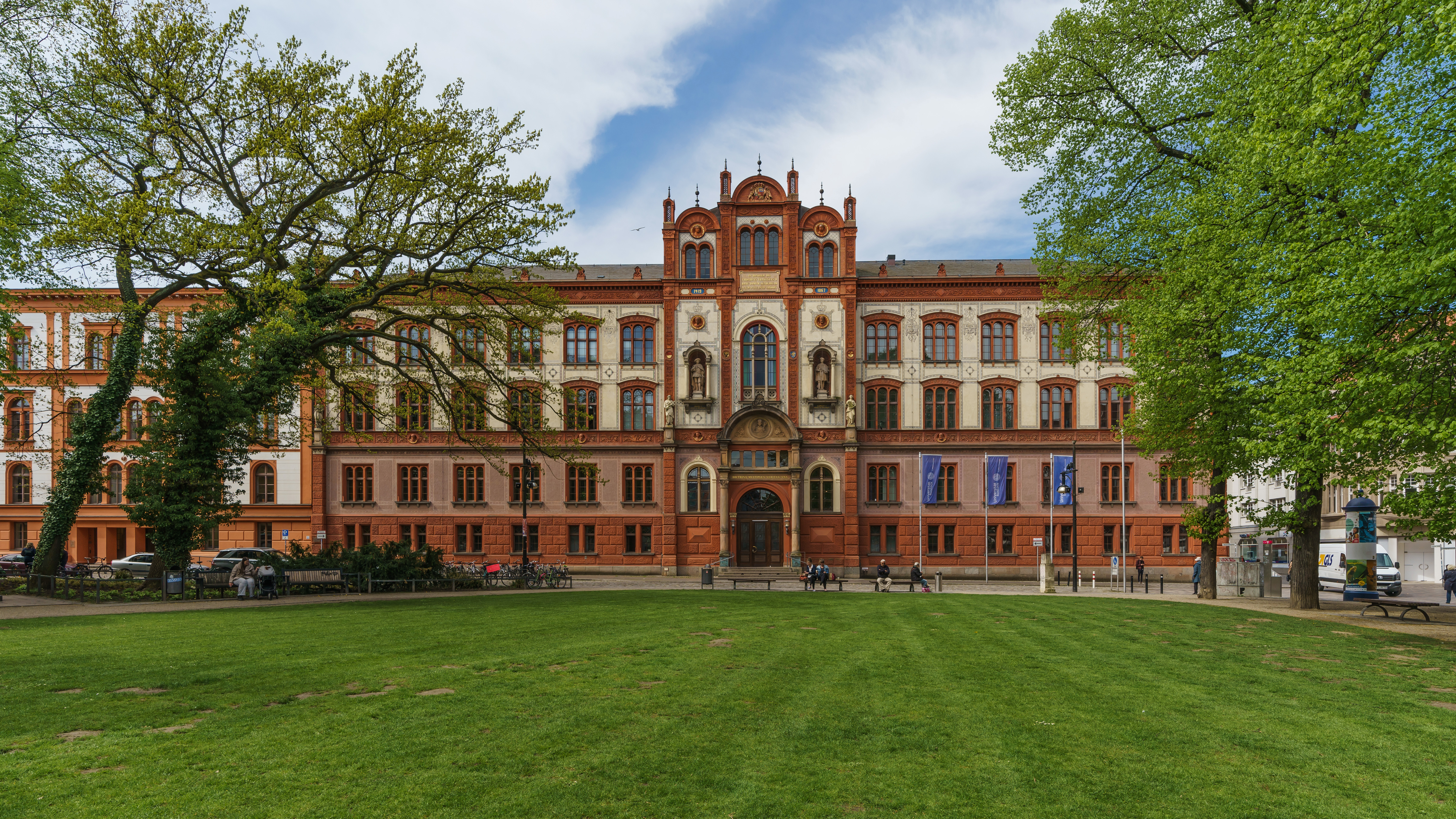
Rostock University, the oldest university in continental northern Europe and the Baltic Sea area, founded in 1419

During the first partition of Mecklenburg following the death of Henry Borwin II of Mecklenburg in 1226, Rostock became the seat of the Lordship of Rostock, which survived for almost a century. In 1251, the city became a member of the Hanseatic League. In the 14th century it was a powerful seaport town with 12,000 inhabitants and the largest city in Mecklenburg. Ships for cruising the Baltic Sea were constructed in Rostock. The formerly independent fishing village of Warnemünde at the Baltic Sea became a part of Rostock in 1323, to secure the city's access to the sea.

In 1419, the University of Rostock was founded, the oldest university in continental northern Europe and the Baltic Sea area.

=== 15th to 18th centuries ===
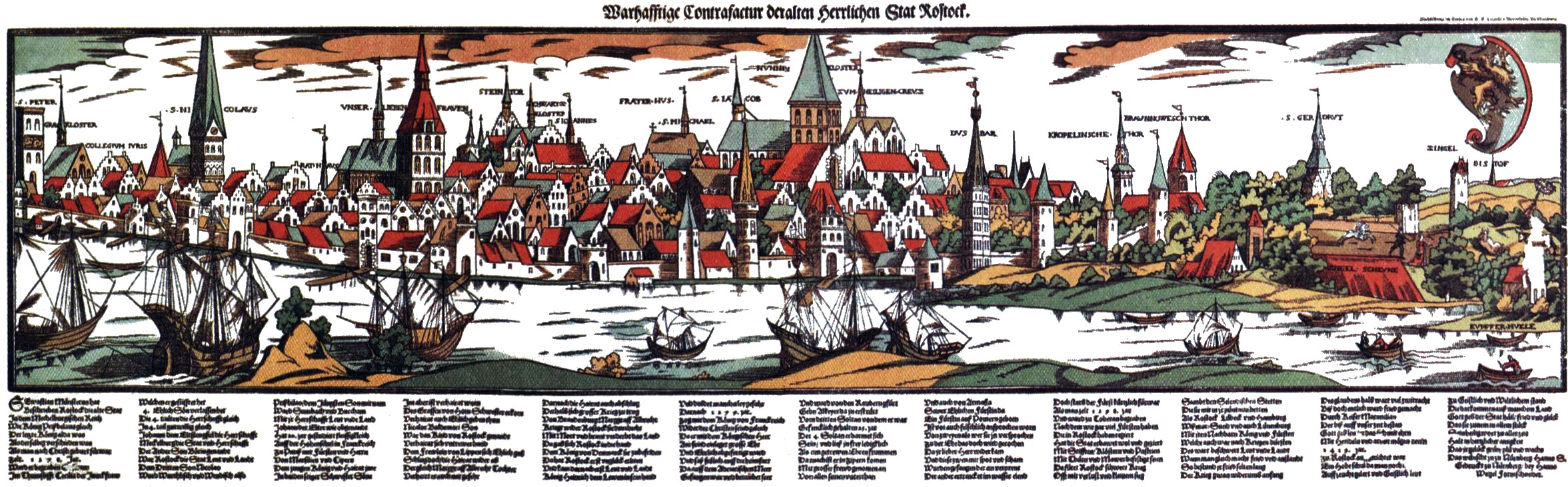
Rostock in the 16th century

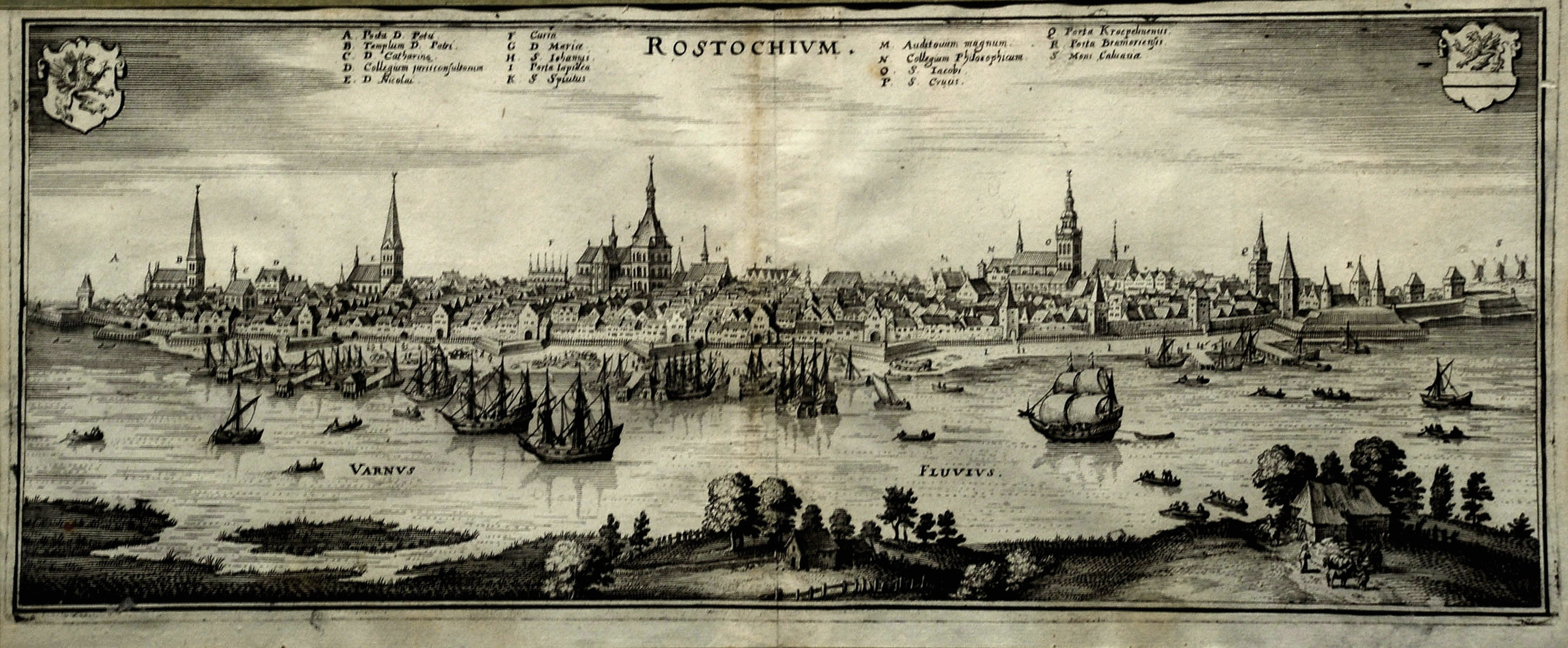
Rostock in the 17th century

At the end of the 15th century, the dukes of Mecklenburg succeeded in enforcing their rule over the town of Rostock, which had until then been only nominally subject to their rule and essentially independent. They took advantage of a riot known as Domfehde, a failed uprising of the impoverished population. Subsequent quarrels with the dukes and persistent plundering led ultimately to a loss of the city's economic and political power.

Rostock 1780–90

In 1565 there were further clashes with Schwerin that had far-reaching consequences. Among other things, the nobility introduced a beer excise that favoured the dukes. John Albert I advanced on the city with 500 horsemen, after Rostock had refused to take the formal oath of allegiance, and had the city wall razed (slighted) to have a fortress built. The conflict did not end until the first Rostock Inheritance Agreement of 21 September 1573, in which the state princes were guaranteed hereditary rule over the city for centuries and recognizing them as the supreme judicial authority; this bound Rostock for a long time. The citizens razed (or slighted) the fortress the following spring.

From 1575 to 1577 the city walls were rebuilt, as was the Lagebusch tower and the Stein Gate, in the Dutch Renaissance style. The inscription sit intra te concordia et publica felicitas ("Let there be harmony and public happiness within you"), can still be read on the gate, and refers directly to the conflict with the Duke. In 1584 the Second Rostock Inheritance Agreement was enforced, which resulted in a further loss of former city tax privileges. At the same time, these inheritance contracts put paid to Rostock's ambition of achieving imperial immediacy, as Lübeck had done in 1226.

The strategic location of Rostock provoked the envy of its rivals. Danes and Swedes occupied the city twice, first during the Thirty Years' War (1618–48) and again from 1700 to 1721. A few years after the Thirty Years' War, which had taken a heavy toll on the city, a major fire broke out in 1677, destroying more than a third of Rostock. For a long time, the city was unable to recover economically from these setbacks. The university, too, fell into crisis and lost its transregional significance. Later in the early 19th century, the French, under Napoleon, occupied the town for about a decade until 1813. In nearby Lübeck-Ratekau, Gebhard Leberecht von Blücher, who was born in Rostock and who was one of few generals to fight on after defeat at the Battle of Jena, surrendered to the French in 1806.

=== 19th century ===
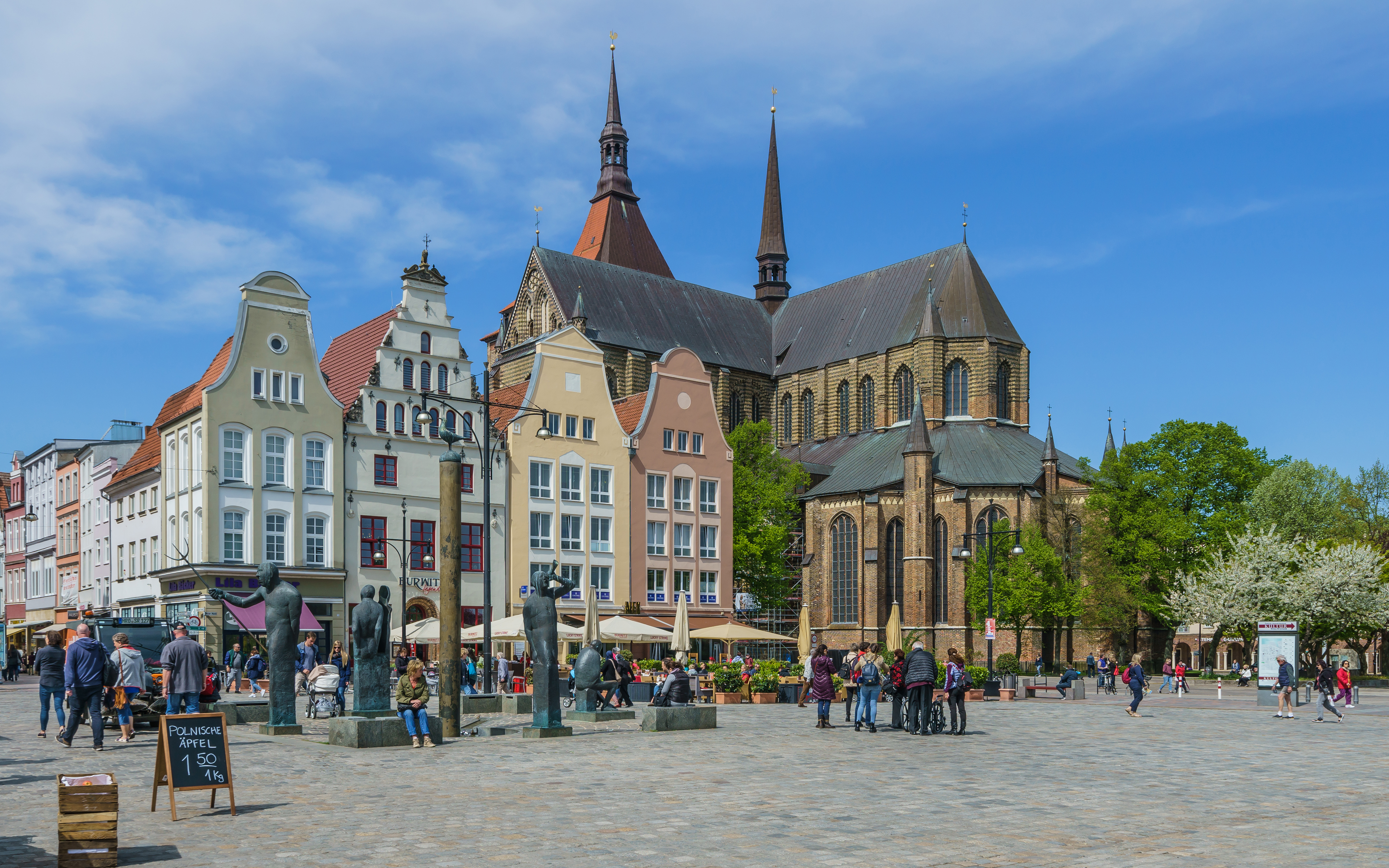
Colourful gabled houses of Rostock

In the first half of the 19th century, Rostock regained much of its economic importance, due at first to the wheat trade, then, from the 1850s, to industry, especially its shipyards. The first propeller-driven steamers in Germany were constructed here.

The Grand Duchy also invested heavily in the University of Rostock, which, after a long period of neglect, experienced a resurgence thanks to internal reforms, the establishment of new institutes, and the recruitment of prominent scholars. The city grew in area and population, with new quarters developing in the south and west of the ancient borders of the city. Two notable developments were added to house the increasing population at around 1900:

- Steintor-Vorstadt in the south, stretching from the old city wall to the facilities of the new Lloydbahnhof (Lloyd Railway Station, now Rostock Hauptbahnhof), was designed as a living quarter. It consisted mostly of large single houses, once inhabited by wealthy citizens.
- Kröpeliner-Tor-Vorstadt in the west, was designed to house the working population as well as to provide smaller and larger industrial facilities, such as the Mahn & Ohlerich's Brewery (now Hanseatische Brauerei Rostock). The main shipyard, Neptun, was nearby at the shore of the river.

=== 20th century ===
In the 20th century, important aircraft manufacturing facilities were situated in the city, such as the Arado Flugzeugwerke in Warnemünde and the Heinkel Works with facilities at various places, including their secondary Heinkel-Süd facility in Schwechat, Austria, as the original Heinkel firm's Rostock facilities had been renamed Heinkel-Nord. The world's first airworthy jet plane prototype made its test flights at their facilities in what used to be named the Rostock-Marienehe neighborhood (today's Rostock-Schmarl community, along the west bank of the Unterwarnow estuary).

In the early 1930s, the Nazi Party gained in popularity among Rostock's voters, many of whom had suffered economic hardship during the 1920s. In elections in the summer of 1932, when the Nazis achieved 37.3 percent, their greatest national showing in a free election, they polled 40.3 percent in Rostock. A year later, after the Nazi seizure of power and the suppression of other political parties, the Rostock city council (Stadtrat) was composed entirely of Nazis. During Kristallnacht on 10 November 1938, the synagogue in Rostock's Augustenstrasse was destroyed by arson and dozens of Jews were beaten and imprisoned.

Feverish rearmament by the Nazi regime boosted Rostock's industrial importance in the late 1930s, and employment soared at the Heinkel and Arado factories, and at the Neptunwerft shipyard. The city's population grew from 100,000 in 1935 to 121,192 in 1939.

During World War II, Rostock was subjected to repeated and increasingly heavy bombing attacks, especially by the British Royal Air Force. Targets included the Heinkel and Arado plants and the shipyard, but churches and other historic structures in the city centre were also heavily damaged, among them the 14th-century Nikolaikirche (St Nicholas Church) and Jakobikirche (St Jacob's Church). The ruins of the latter were pulled down in 1960.

The city was eventually captured by the Soviet 2nd Belorussian Front on 2 May 1945 during the Stettin-Rostock offensive operation.

After the war, Rostock – now in the German Democratic Republic – became East Germany's largest seaport. The state expanded the national shipyards in the district of Warnemünde. The city's population, boosted in part by resettled ethnic German refugees who had been expelled from territories in the east, increased in the GDR years to a peak of 260,000. Following the reunification of Germany in 1990, Rostock lost its privileged position as the No. 1 port of the GDR, and the city's population declined to about 200,000. However, after 2006, the population increased again. Today, Rostock and Warnemünde are significant tourist destinations on the Baltic Sea.

In August 1992, Rostock was the site of the xenophobic Rostock-Lichtenhagen riots, during which asylum seekers were attacked by right-wing extremists.

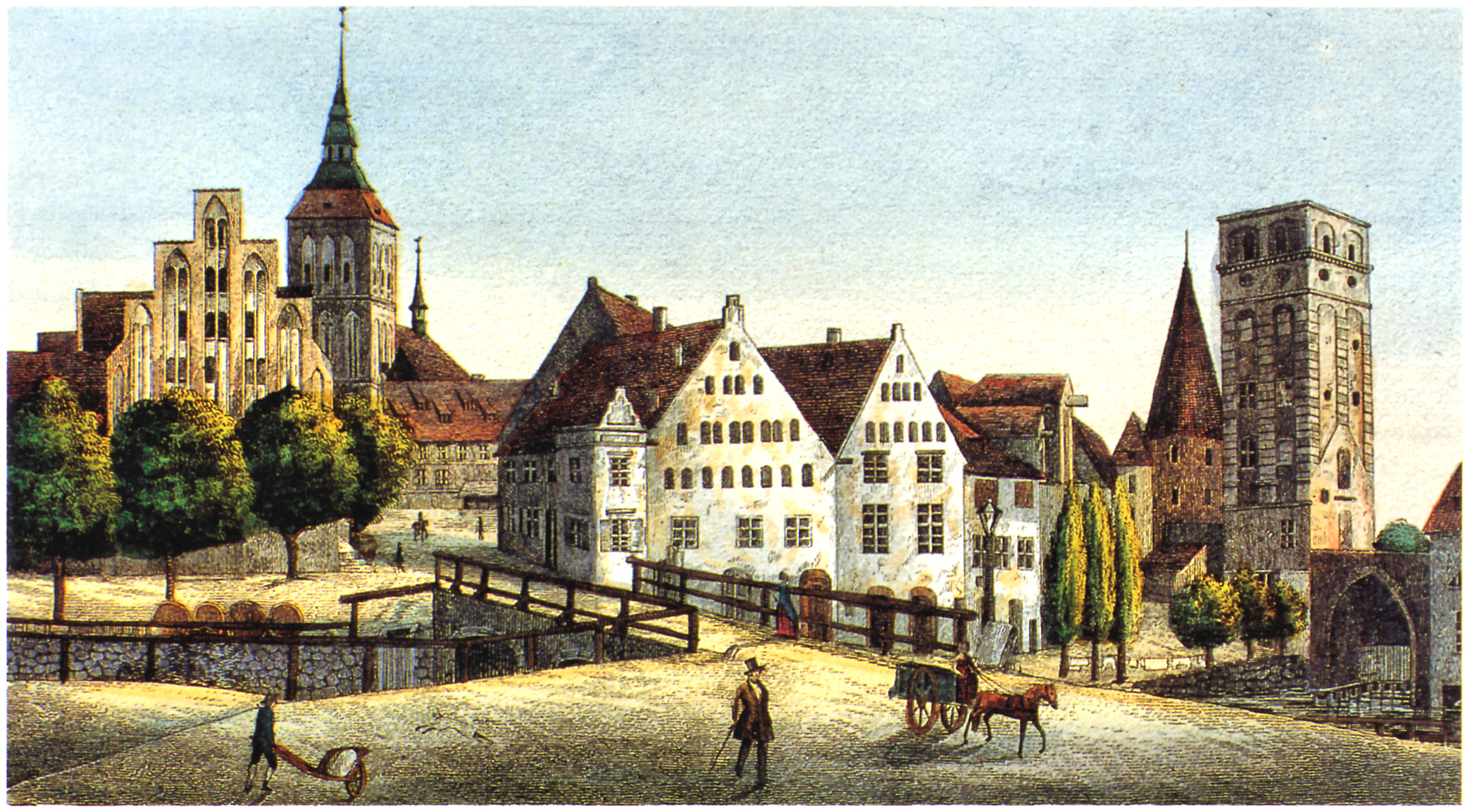
Depiction of Rostock in 1845

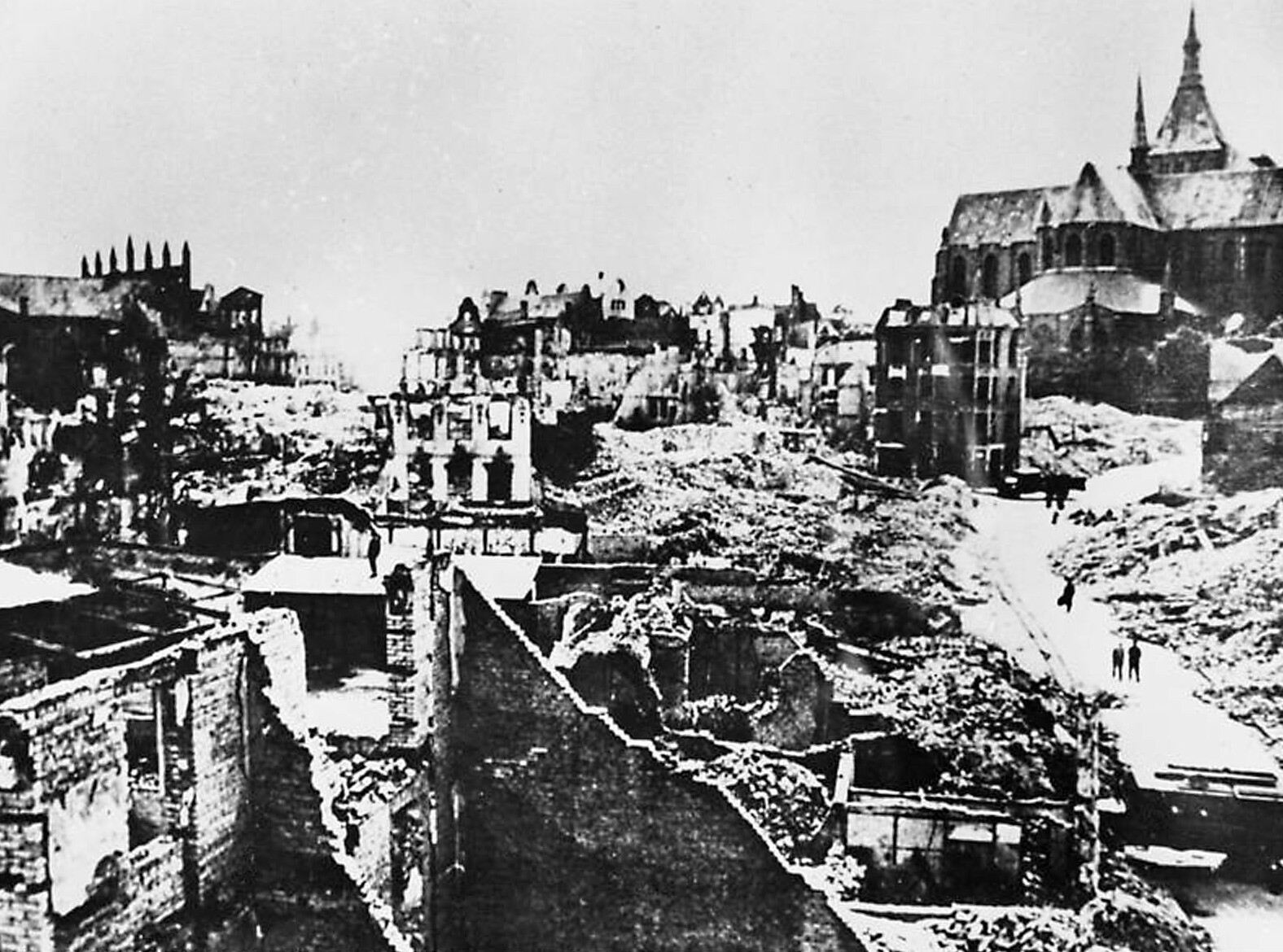
Rostock bomb damage, 1942

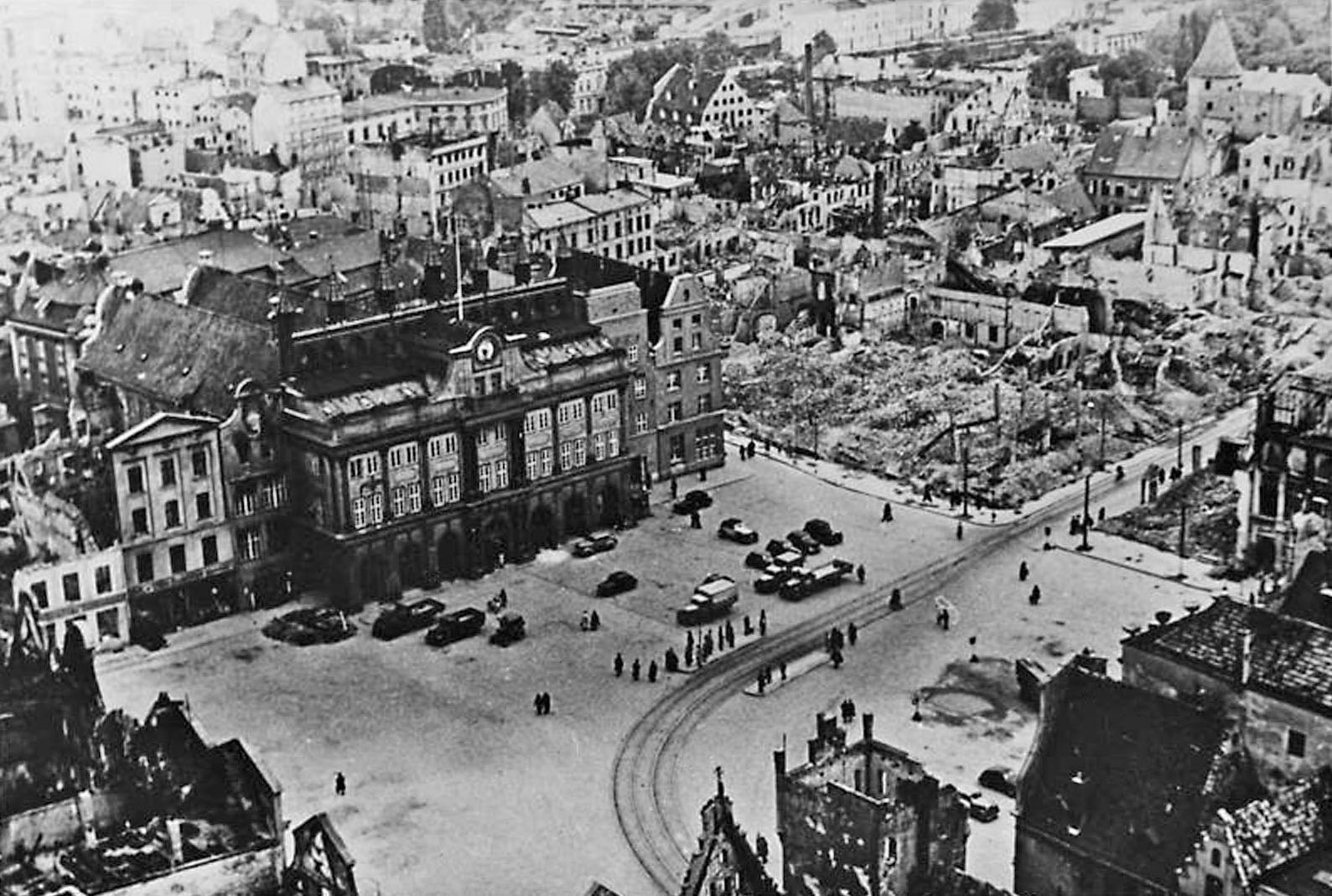
City hall, Market Square after war

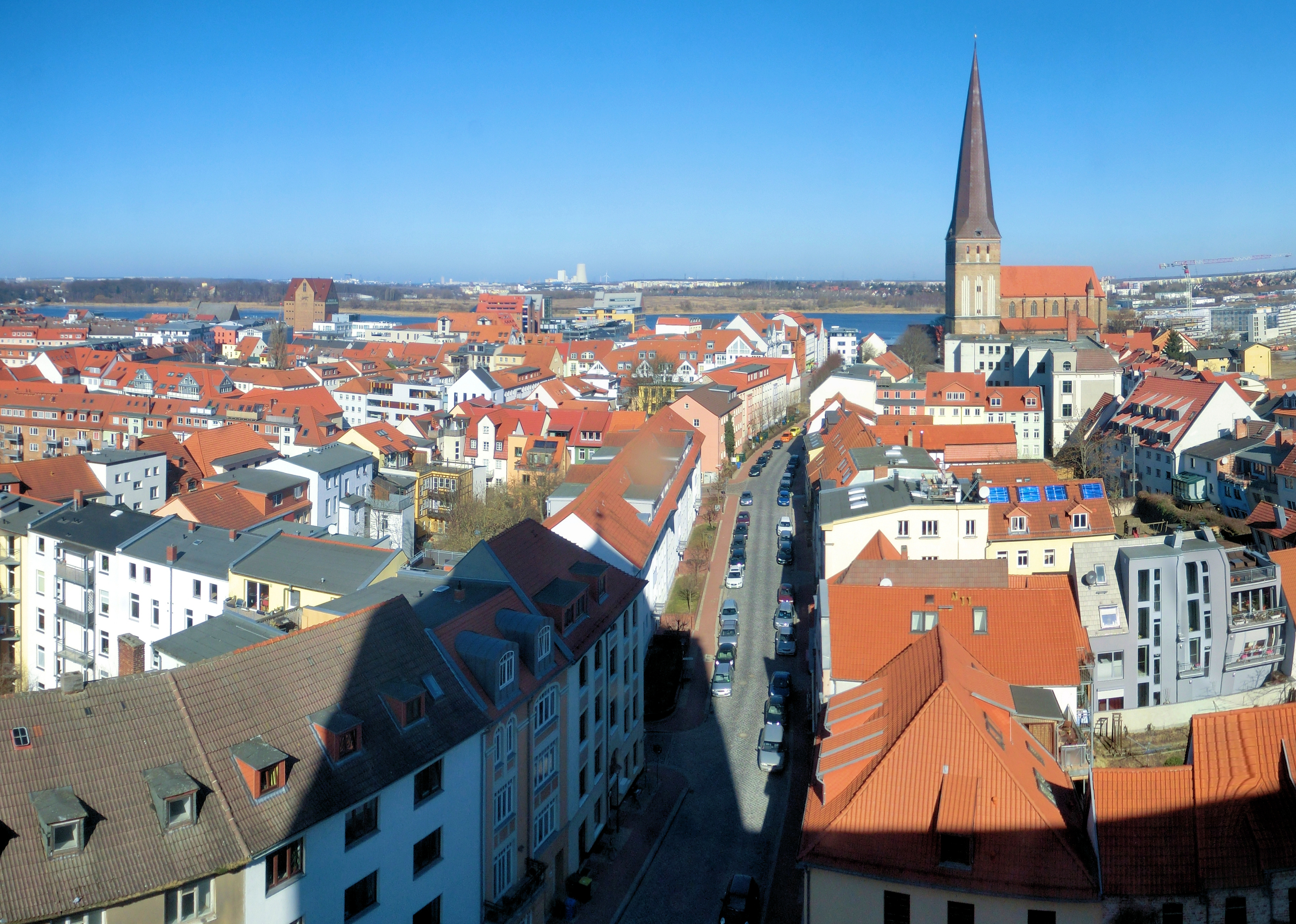
Rostock in 2011

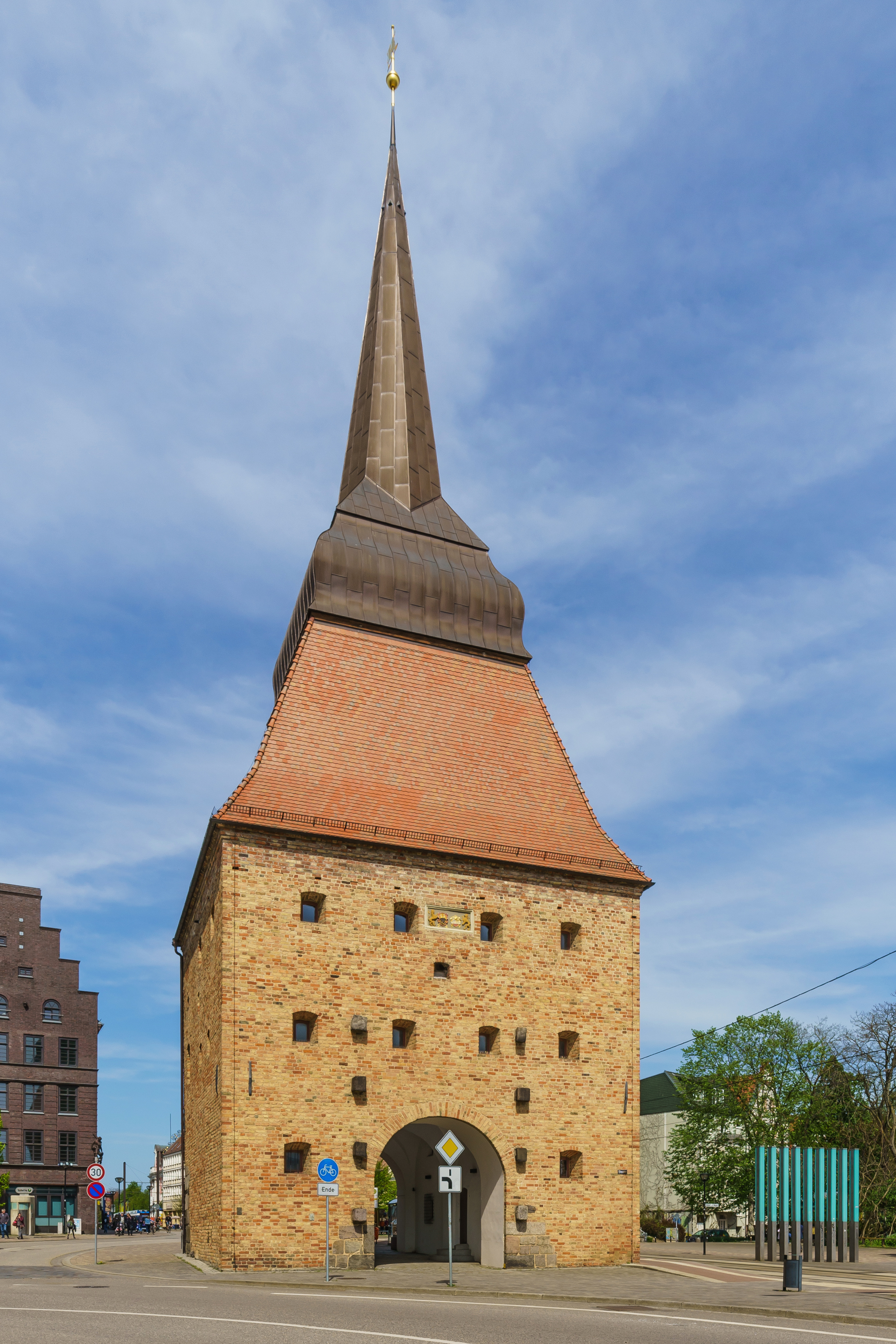
The 16th-century Steintor city gate

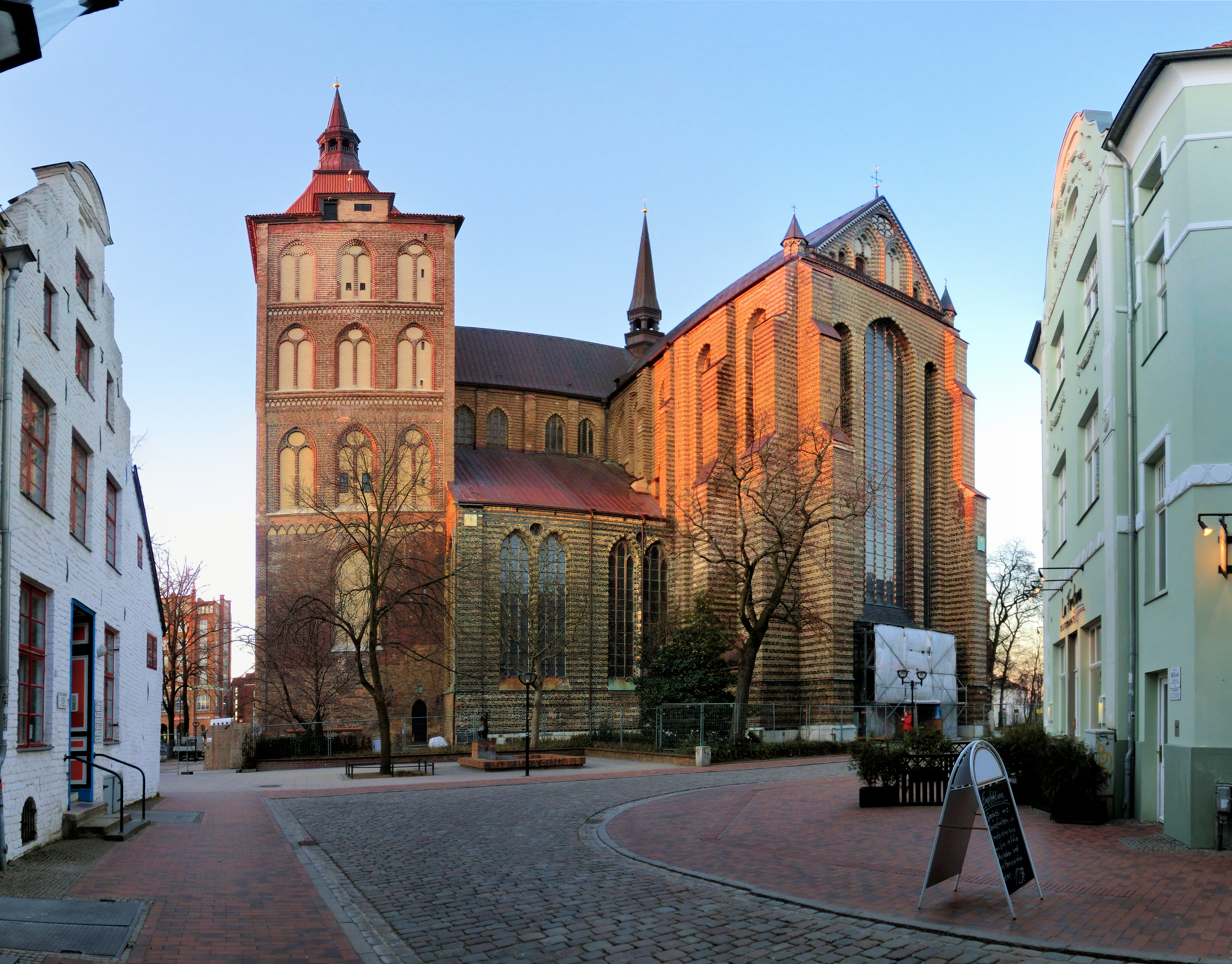
St. Mary's Church (Marienkirche), 2011

== Population ==
Historical population
Year	Pop.	±%
1378	10,785	—
1773	9,000	−16.6%
1871	30,980	+244.2%
1900	54,713	+76.6%
1910	65,383	+19.5%
1919	67,953	+3.9%
1925	77,669	+14.3%
1933	90,150	+16.1%
1935	104,585	+16.0%
1939	121,315	+16.0%
1950	133,109	+9.7%
1955	150,004	+12.7%
1960	158,630	+5.8%
1965	184,204	+16.1%
1970	198,636	+7.8%
1975	213,475	+7.5%
1980	232,506	+8.9%
1985	244,444	+5.1%
1990	248,088	+1.5%
1995	227,535	−8.3%
2000	200,506	−11.9%
2005	199,288	−0.6%
2011	200,265	+0.5%
2022	203,470	+1.6%
Population size may be affected by changes in administrative divisions.

Rostock has a population of about 210,000 people and is the largest city in Mecklenburg-Vorpommern state. Rostock became a member of Hanseatic League in 15th century, which made Rostock a prominent city. Rostock reached its peak of over 100,000 in 1935. In the East German era, Rostock was the largest and most important port of East Germany when many sailors and boatmen moved to the city. It also brought many marine and other industries to Rostock. Rostock reached its historical peak of population in 1988 with population of about 254,000. After the German Reunification, the population of Rostock declined due to many people moving to former West Germany. Since 2003, Rostock's population has started to grow again due to students and new companies.

Rank	Nationality	Population (31.12.2022)
1	Ukraine	2,816
2	Syria	2,439
3	Poland	1,574
4	Vietnam	1,382
5	Russia	1,033
6	Afghanistan	794
7	Romania	714
8	Iran	545
9	India	465
10	Bulgaria	385

== Politics ==
=== Districts ===
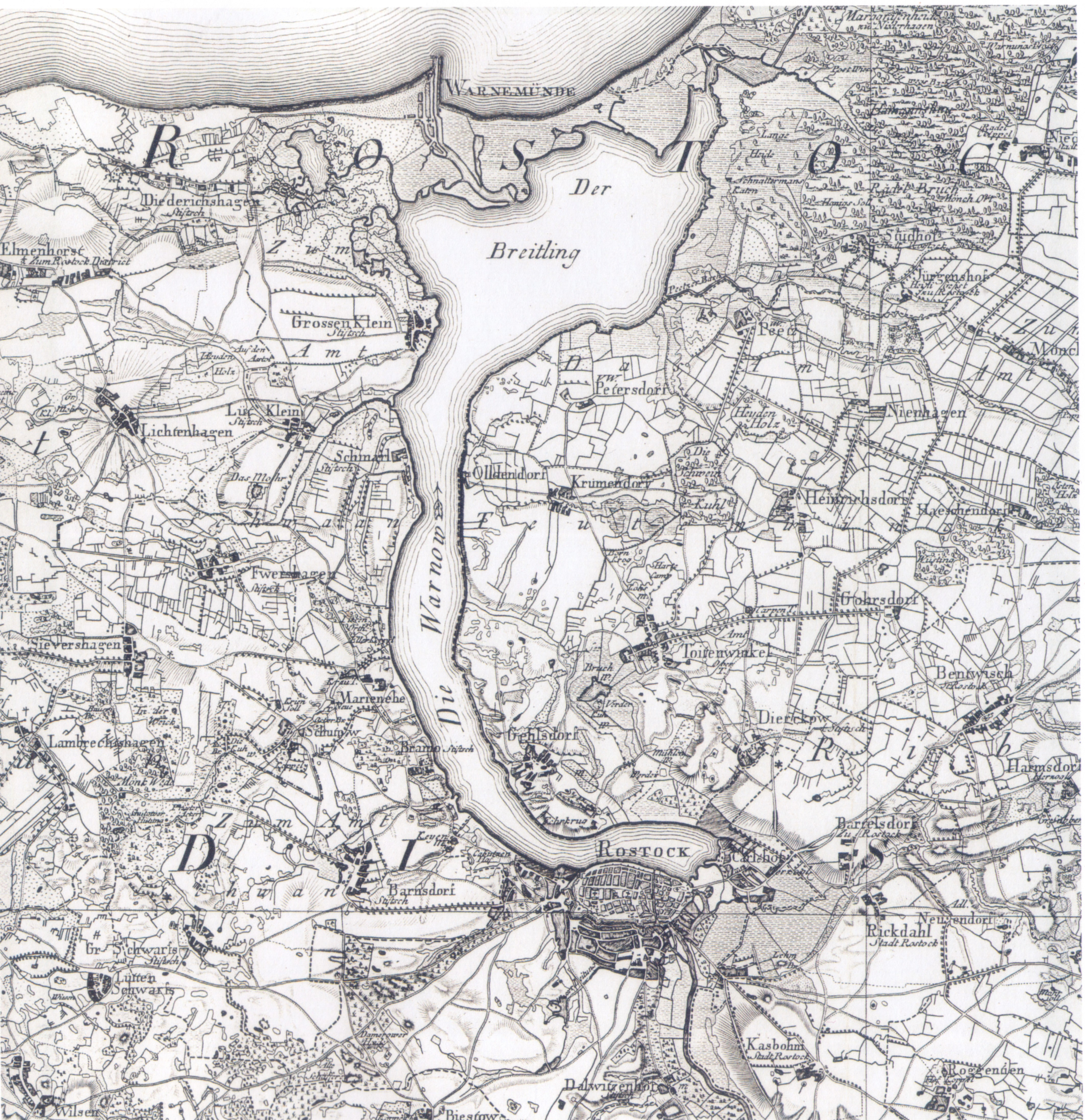
1788 historic map of Rostock, showing earlier district names
Modern Districts of Rostock

=== Symbols ===
Coat of arms

Motto: Within your walls may be harmony and happiness (in Latin)

Rostock has had three different coats of arms, known as the Signum, the Secretum and the Sigillum. The Signum, which can be traced back to 1367, was developed last and is to this day the coat of arms of the city.

The Signum depicts a golden griffin on a blue background, with bars of silver and red, the colours of the Hanseatic League, below. It can be seen not only on flags and houses, and at bus stops, but also on bridges, gullies, fences, ships and restaurants.

=== Administration ===
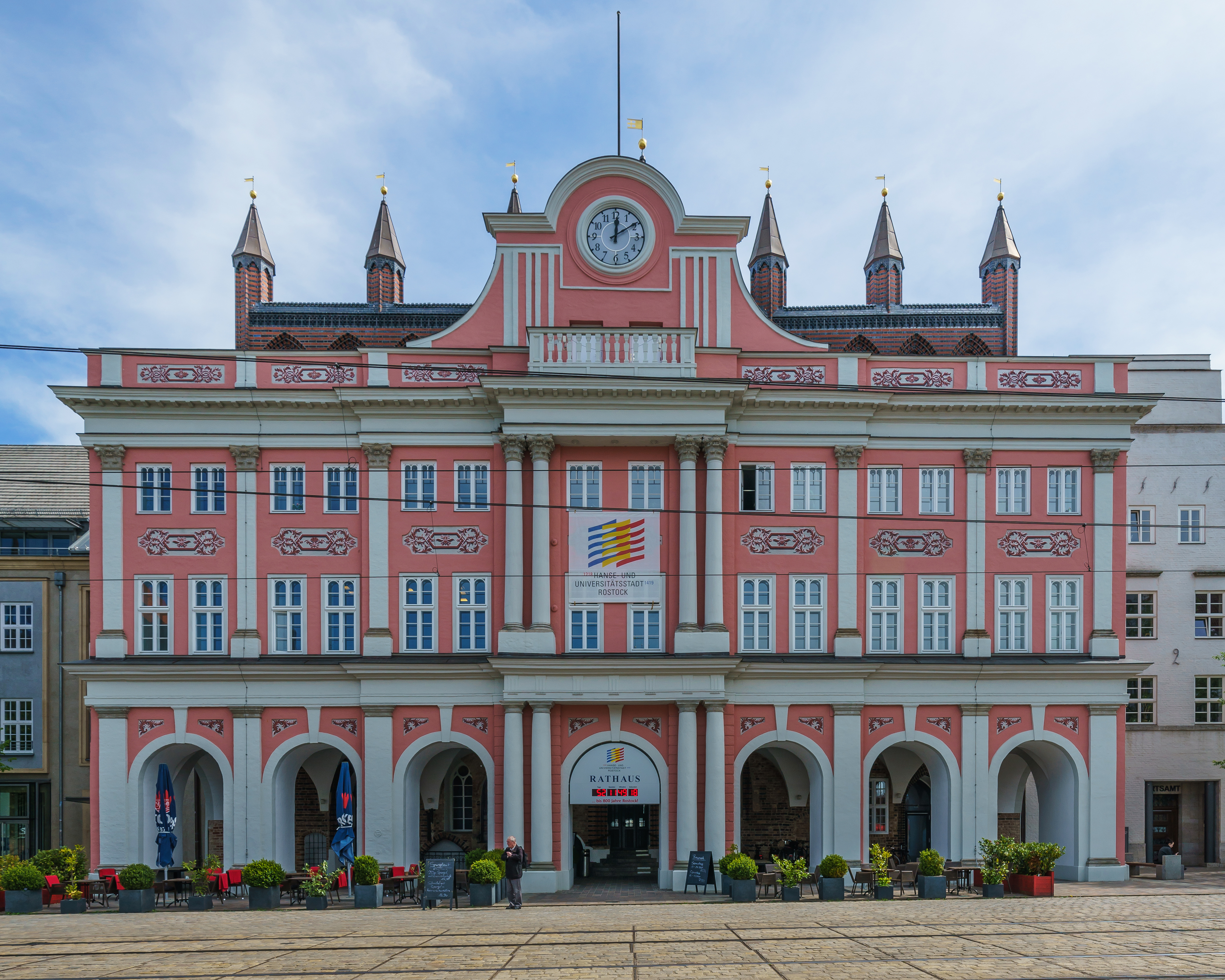
Restored Rostock City Hall, a mixture of Baroque and Brick Gothic architecture

Since the 13th century, the governing body of the city has been the city council (Rat), first consisting of ten, later of 24 elected aldermen (Ratsherren). The chairman of the city council was the city mayor. In the 19th century there were three mayors. Since 1925, the head of the city has borne the title of Mayor. Having been elected by the city council for centuries, since 2002 this position is now elected directly by the citizens of Rostock, following a reform. If a candidate does not achieve an absolute majority in the first round, the two candidates with the most votes stand in a second round.

Results of the second round of the 2022 mayoral election

The current mayor of Rostock is Eva-Maria Kröger of The Left, who was elected mayor in 2022 and took office on 1 February 2023. She won in the second round with 58.4% of votes against senior police officer Michael Ebert, an independent backed by the Christian Democratic Union, Independent Citizens for Rostock, and Free Democratic Party.

The most recent mayoral election was held on 13 November 2022, with a runoff held on 27 November, and the results were as follows:

Candidate	Party	First round		Second round	
Candidate	Party	Votes	%	Votes	%
Eva-Maria Kröger	The Left	18,885	25.3	36,546	58.4
Michael Ebert	Independent (CDU/UFR/FDP)	17,598	23.6	26,082	41.6
Carmen-Alina Botezatu	Social Democratic Party	12,339	16.5		
Claudia Müller	Alliance 90/The Greens	6,414	8.6		
Michael Meister	Alternative for Germany	4,812	6.5		
Jörg Kibellus	Independent	3,836	5.1		
Jens Kaufmann	Independent	3,007	4.0		
Robert Uhde	Independent	1,807	2.4		
Karol Langnickel	Independent	1,442	1.9		
Holger Luckstein	Independent	1,182	1.6		
Niels Burmeister	Independent	1,109	1.5		
Rebecca Thoß	German Beer Drinkers Union	669	0.9		
Niklas Zimathis	Independent	453	0.6		
Roland Ulrich	Independent	369	0.5		
Matthias Bräuer	Independent	312	0.4		
Kai Oppermann	Independent	196	0.3		
Alina Kreis	Independent	155	0.2		
Valid votes		71,585	99.4	62,628	99.1
Invalid votes		476	0.6	563	0.9
Total		75,061	100.0	63,191	100.0
Electorate/voter turnout		171,884	43.7	171,464	36.9
Source: City of Rostock (1st round, 2nd round)

Winning party by precinct in the 2019 city council election

Seat distribution in the 2019 city council election

The city parliament (Bürgerschaft) represents the citizens. Representative are elected for five years. The number of representatives is currently 53. The city parliament is presided by the Präsident der Bürgerschaft, who heads and prepares the sessions and, together with the mayor, represents the city. The most recent city council election was held on 26 May 2019, and the results were as follows:

Party	Votes	%	±	Seats	±
The Left (Die Linke)	58,405	19.9	▼6.5	11	▼3
Alliance 90/The Greens (Grüne)	55,616	19.0	▲7.5	10	▲4
Christian Democratic Union (CDU)	42,422	14.5	▼6.0	8	▼3
Social Democratic Party (SPD)	42,269	14.4	▼2.5	8	▼1
Alternative for Germany (AfD)	28,294	9.6	▲5.2	5	▲3
Independent Citizens for Rostock (UFR)	21,483	7.3	▼0.8	4	±0
Rostock Alliance (RB)	12,086	4.1	▼0.5	2	▼1
Free Democratic Party (FDP)	9,645	3.3	▲0.8	2	▲1
Die PARTEI (PARTEI)	7,373	2.5	New	1	New
Free Voters (FW)	3,790	1.3	New	1	New
New Start 09 (A'09)	2,897	1.0	▼0.5	1	±0
The Grays - For All Generations (Graue)	1,869	0.6	▼0.1	0	▼1
Pirate Party Germany (Piraten)	1,714	0.6	New	0	New
National Democratic Party (NPD)	1,633	0.6	▼1.2	0	▼1
Independents	3,779	1.3		0	±0
Valid votes	293,275	98.6			
Invalid votes	4,179	1.4			
Total	102,304	100.0		53	±0
Electorate/voter turnout	173,650	58.9	▲18.4		
Source: City of Rostock

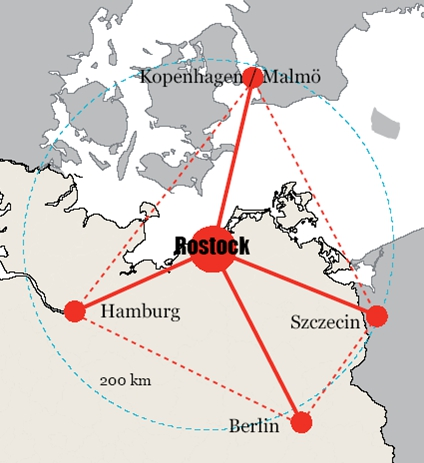
Geographical position of the Rostock Regiopolis

=== Regiopolis Rostock ===
Rostock is the first city region that defines itself not only as a city in its boundaries, but as a regiopolis, with a supra-regional sphere of influence. A regiopolis can be compared to a metropolis, but on a smaller scale. This is a sign for the inter-regional cooperation and economic dynamics that can be found in the Rostock area. A taskforce with different actors such as the hanseatic city of Rostock, the administrative district of Rostock, the Regional Planning Association Middle Mecklenburg/Rostock and the local business organisations are working on the promotion and advancement of the concept.

== Geography ==
=== Geographic location ===
Rostock is located nearly centrally on Mecklenburg-Vorpommern's Baltic Sea coast. The city is crossed by the Warnow.

The seaside part of Rostock, Rostock-Warnemünde, is about 16 km (10 mi) to the north of the historic city centre. The west and the southeast are the most densely populated parts of town. The overseas port is to the east of Rostock. Rostock stretches 21.6 km (13.4 mi) from the Baltic Sea to the south and 19.4 km (12.1 mi) from east to west.

=== Climate ===
Rostock has an oceanic climate (Köppen: Cfb; Trewartha: Dobk) with strong influence of the Baltic Sea, more similar to Denmark and far southern Sweden than to the rest of Germany. The main difference with lower Scandinavia is that the continuous landmass to the south and east enables stronger bursts of heat during summer. In spite of this, the Warnemünde station is generally less warm on the average summer day than on the northern side of the sea. In addition, the maritime influence of the Baltic Sea tempers any Arctic blasts, ensuring slightly milder winters. The Warnemünde station is located on the open sea and thus has a stronger maritime influence and slightly smaller variations than the downtown that is further inland.

The Rostock weather station has recorded the following extreme values:

- Its highest temperature was 38.4 °C (101.1 °F) on 20 July 2022.
- Its lowest temperature was −18.4 °C (−1.1 °F) on 16 February 1956.
- Its greatest annual precipitation was 954.6 mm (37.58 in) in 2011.
- Its least annual precipitation was 427.1 mm (16.81 in) in 1976.
- The longest annual sunshine was 2,190 hours in 2018.
- The shortest annual sunshine was 1,456.6 hours in 1998.

Climate data for Rostock (Warnemünde), 1991–2020 normals, extremes 1947–present
Month	Jan	Feb	Mar	Apr	May	Jun	Jul	Aug	Sep	Oct	Nov	Dec	Year
Record high °C (°F)	15.8 (60.4)	18.1 (64.6)	22.3 (72.1)	29.5 (85.1)	32.8 (91.0)	35.9 (96.6)	38.4 (101.1)	36.9 (98.4)	32.6 (90.7)	26.1 (79.0)	20.0 (68.0)	15.5 (59.9)	38.4 (101.1)
Mean maximum °C (°F)	10.1 (50.2)	10.9 (51.6)	15.7 (60.3)	22.0 (71.6)	26.2 (79.2)	28.9 (84.0)	30.3 (86.5)	30.6 (87.1)	25.4 (77.7)	19.8 (67.6)	14.0 (57.2)	10.7 (51.3)	32.5 (90.5)
Mean daily maximum °C (°F)	3.8 (38.8)	4.4 (39.9)	7.3 (45.1)	12.2 (54.0)	16.4 (61.5)	19.7 (67.5)	22.0 (71.6)	22.2 (72.0)	18.5 (65.3)	13.3 (55.9)	8.0 (46.4)	4.9 (40.8)	12.7 (54.9)
Daily mean °C (°F)	1.9 (35.4)	2.2 (36.0)	4.4 (39.9)	8.4 (47.1)	12.5 (54.5)	16.0 (60.8)	18.4 (65.1)	18.4 (65.1)	15.0 (59.0)	10.5 (50.9)	6.0 (42.8)	3.0 (37.4)	9.7 (49.5)
Mean daily minimum °C (°F)	−0.2 (31.6)	0.1 (32.2)	1.8 (35.2)	5.2 (41.4)	9.0 (48.2)	12.6 (54.7)	15.0 (59.0)	15.0 (59.0)	12.0 (53.6)	7.9 (46.2)	4.0 (39.2)	1.1 (34.0)	6.9 (44.4)
Mean minimum °C (°F)	−7.7 (18.1)	−6.0 (21.2)	−2.9 (26.8)	0.3 (32.5)	4.3 (39.7)	8.7 (47.7)	11.2 (52.2)	11.1 (52.0)	7.7 (45.9)	2.5 (36.5)	−1.6 (29.1)	−5.8 (21.6)	−9.9 (14.2)
Record low °C (°F)	−17.8 (0.0)	−18.4 (−1.1)	−15.1 (4.8)	−4.0 (24.8)	0.0 (32.0)	2.5 (36.5)	7.3 (45.1)	6.5 (43.7)	3.4 (38.1)	−1.8 (28.8)	−9.3 (15.3)	−15.6 (3.9)	−18.4 (−1.1)
Average precipitation mm (inches)	46.2 (1.82)	38.2 (1.50)	39.2 (1.54)	34.2 (1.35)	49.7 (1.96)	67.8 (2.67)	69.8 (2.75)	68.5 (2.70)	56.1 (2.21)	48.1 (1.89)	45.7 (1.80)	50.9 (2.00)	614.3 (24.19)
Average extreme snow depth cm (inches)	4.9 (1.9)	5.4 (2.1)	3.0 (1.2)	0.1 (0.0)	0 (0)	0 (0)	0 (0)	0 (0)	0 (0)	0 (0)	0.9 (0.4)	4.0 (1.6)	9.9 (3.9)
Average precipitation days (≥ 1.0 mm)	16.6	14.8	13.5	11.3	12.5	13.5	14.0	14.8	13.4	15.1	15.9	17.4	171.9
Average snowy days (≥ 1.0 cm)	5.9	6.0	3.4	0.1	0	0	0	0	0	0	0.8	3.2	19.4
Average relative humidity (%)	84.5	82.1	79.1	74.4	74.4	74.2	74.7	74.8	77.4	80.7	84.5	85.5	78.9
Mean monthly sunshine hours	49.2	67.7	133.3	207.8	260.3	250.4	252.1	224.8	168.7	109.1	53.6	37.1	1,813.9
Source 1: World Meteorological Organization
Source 2: Deutscher Wetterdienst / SKlima.de

== Main sights ==
=== Rostock ===
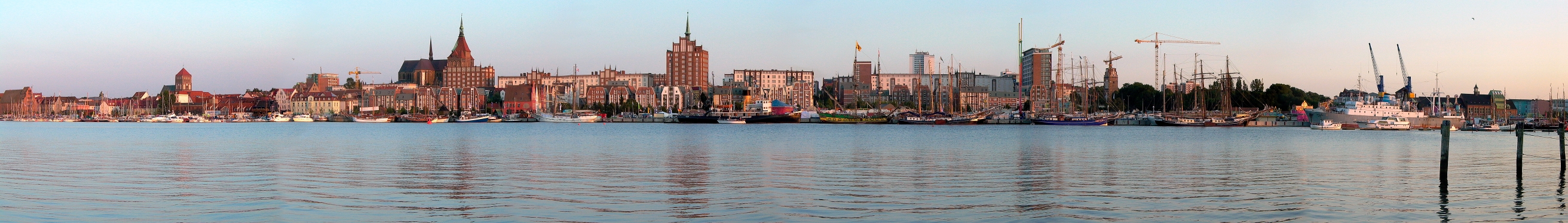
Panorama of Rostock from the bank of the Warnow river during the Hanse Sail

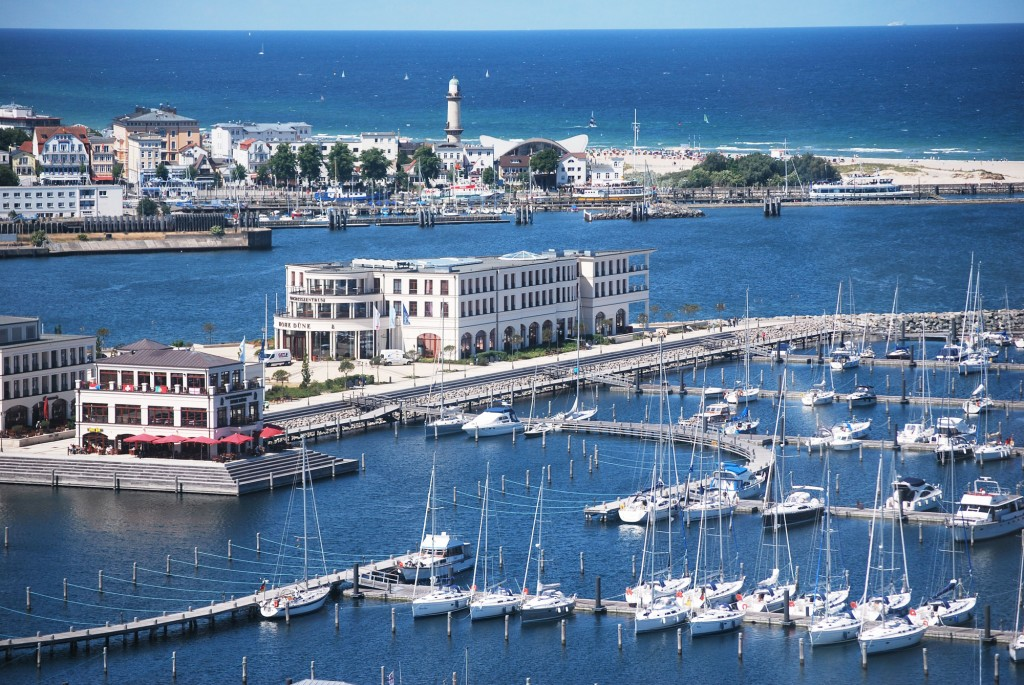
Aerial view of marina and Yacht Harbour Residence "Hohe Düne" at the Baltic Sea, close to Warnemünde

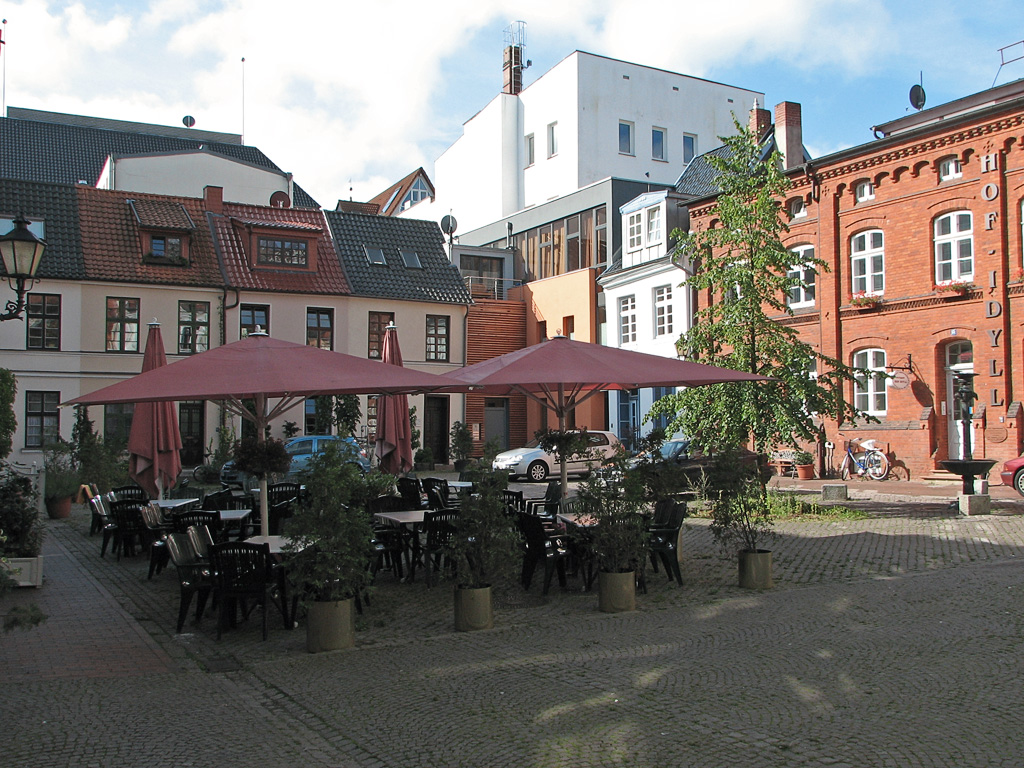
Heiligengeisthof (Holy Spirit Courtyard)

One of the most picturesque places in Rostock is the Neuer Markt (New Market Square), with the Town Hall – that was originally built in the 13th century in Brick Gothic style, but extensively transformed in the 18th century, with the addition of a Baroque façade and a banqueting hall. The square also preserved six original, carefully restored gable houses from the 15th and 16th centuries. The other historical houses in Hanseatic style that once bordered the square were destroyed in an Allied air-raid in 1942, and rebuilt in a simplified manner.

The 15th-century Kerkhofhaus (at Große Wasserstraße, behind the Town Hall) is considered the best-preserved brick Gothic house in Rostock.

St. Mary's Church Marienkirche, on Ziegenmarkt, is an imposing Brick Gothic church. Built in the 13th century, it was enlarged and modified at the end of the 14th century into the present cross-shaped basilica. The huge tower was not completed until the end of the 18th century. Inside there is an astronomical clock erected in 1472 by Hans Düringer.

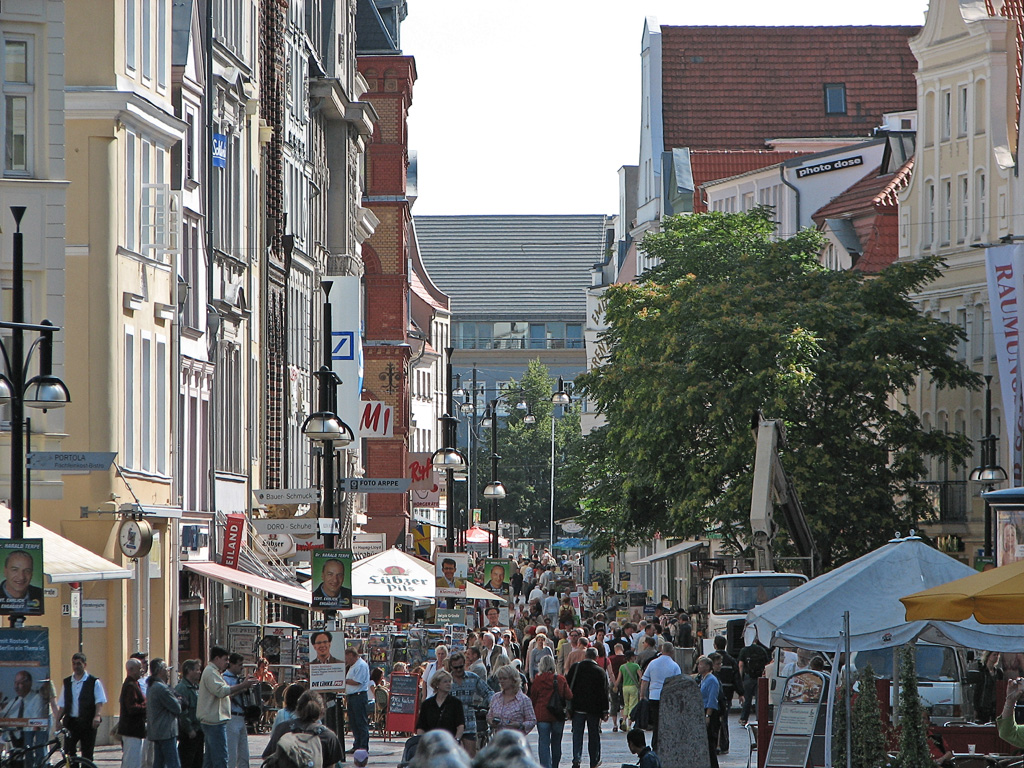
Kröpeliner Straße – main shopping street

The main pedestrian precinct is Kröpeliner Straße, which runs east from the Neuer Markt to the 14th-century Kröpeliner Tor, a former town gate. The main buildings of Rostock University lie at Universitätsplatz, near the middle of the street, in front of the lively fountain of zest for life (Brunnen der Lebensfreude), known colloquially as Pornobrunn (fountain of pornography), for its nude sculptures.

The Kloster St Katharinen (Convent of St. Catherine), is an old Franciscan monastery founded in 1243, and extended several times during the 14th and 15th centuries. Now used as the seat of the Academy of Music and Theatre (HMT-Rostock).

The Brick Gothic Nikolaikirche (St. Nicholas Church), which is the oldest church in Rostock, was built in the mid-13th century. Heavily damaged during World War II and subsequently restored, the building is now used as an exhibition centre and concert hall, due to its outstanding acoustics.

Some parts of the medieval city wall, with four city gates, have survived to the present day. The city has a large population of herring gulls that squawk loudly most days throughout the year.

=== Warnemünde ===
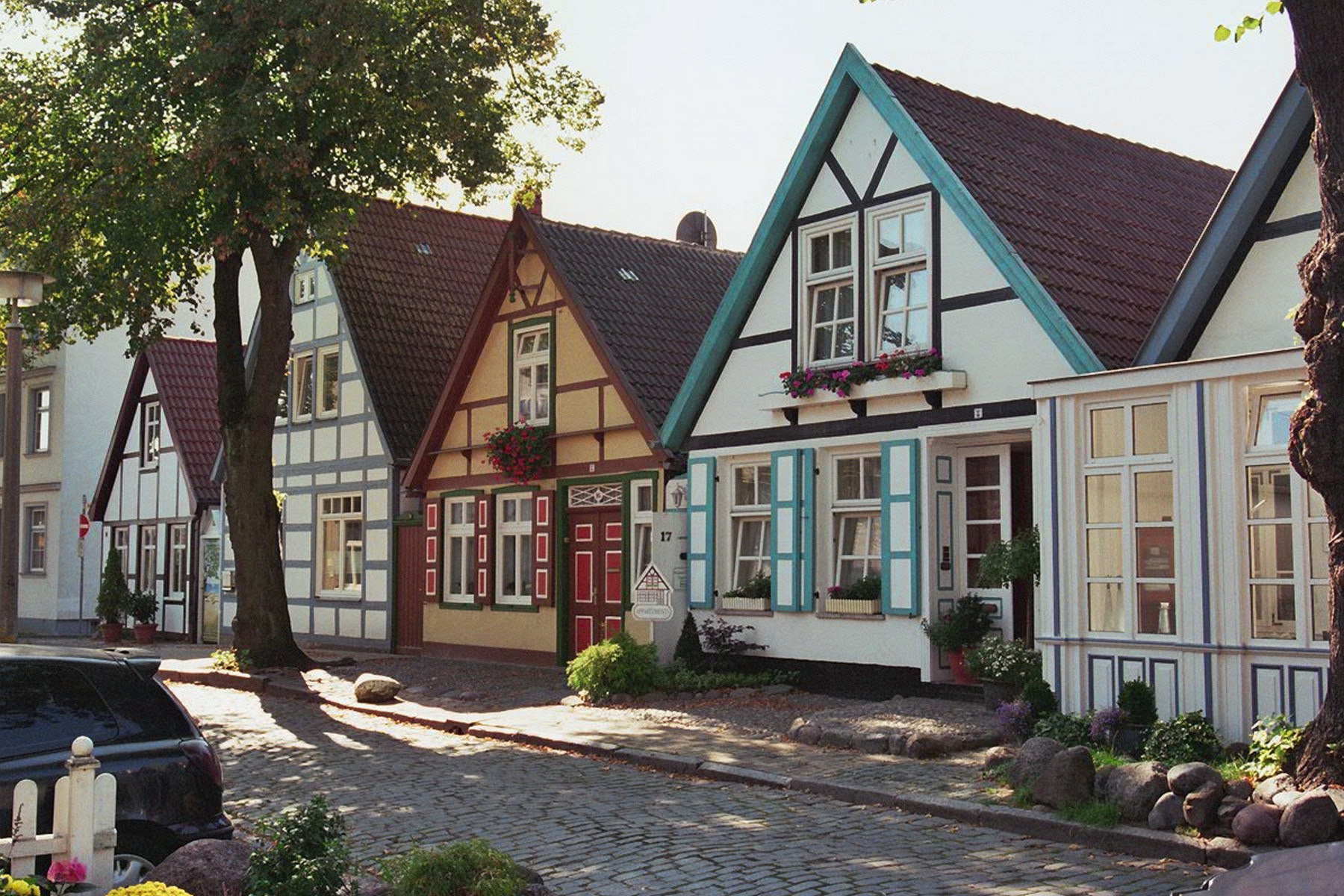
Alexandrinenstraße in Warnemünde

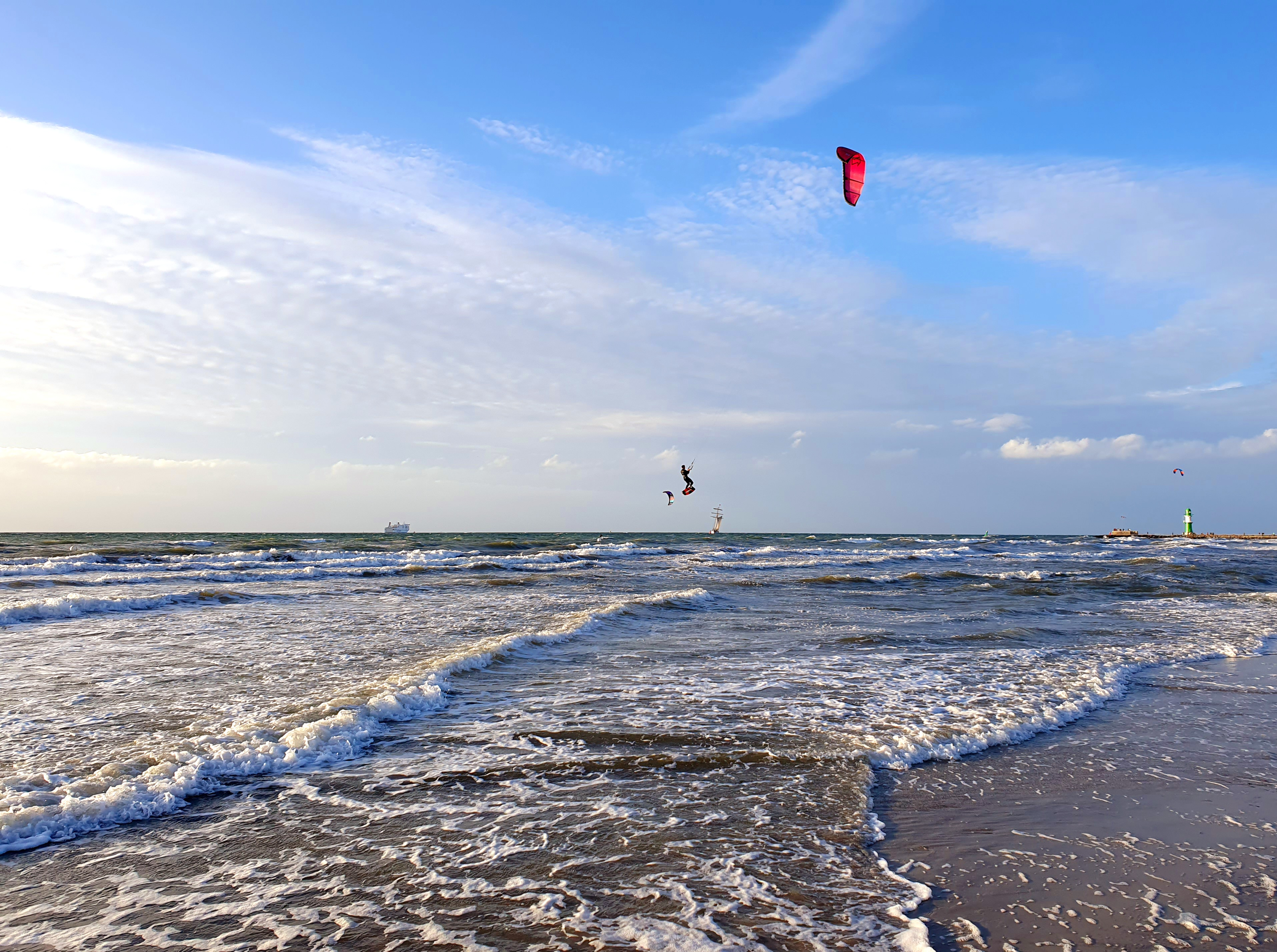
Warnemünde Beach

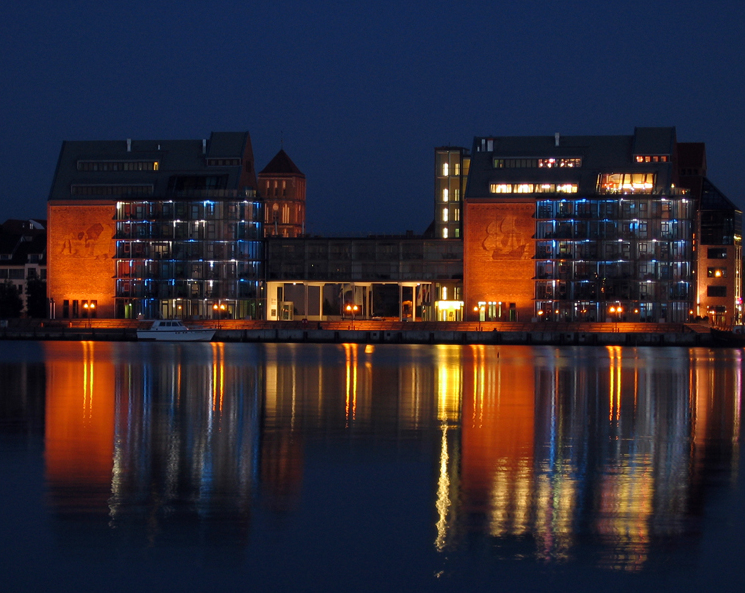
Speicher (office buildings) at night. Headquarters of AIDA Cruises.

Warnemünde is the seaside part of Rostock and a major attraction of the city. Locals and tourists alike enjoy the maritime flair of old houses, a large beach, a lighthouse and the old fisherman's port.

== Economy ==
The economy is mainly characterised by maritime industries (especially shipbuilding), high-tech industries (IT, biotechnology/life sciences, medical engineering), the University of Rostock, tourism and the service sector. Major companies include:

Maritime Industry

- Caterpillar, manufacturer of diesel engines for ships
- Deutsche Seereederei Rostock, transport, cruises, property and tourism holding
- F. Laeisz
- Neptun Werft, shipyard belonging to Meyer Neptun Group
- Nordic Yards Warnemünde, shipyard
- Schiffselektronik Rostock
- Tamsen Maritim shipyard
- AIDA Cruises

Other engineering

- Nordex, a major producer of wind turbines
- Suzlon, world's 5th largest wind turbine manufacturer
- Liebherr, manufacturer of cranes

Tourism industry

- AIDA Cruises, German company for cruises
- Scandlines, German-Danish ferry operator (by Scandferries Holding)

Others

- Hanseatische Brauerei Rostock, German brewery belonging to the Oetker-Gruppe
- Rostock University Hospital (Universitätsmedizin)
- Yara International, supplier of plant nutrients

== Education ==
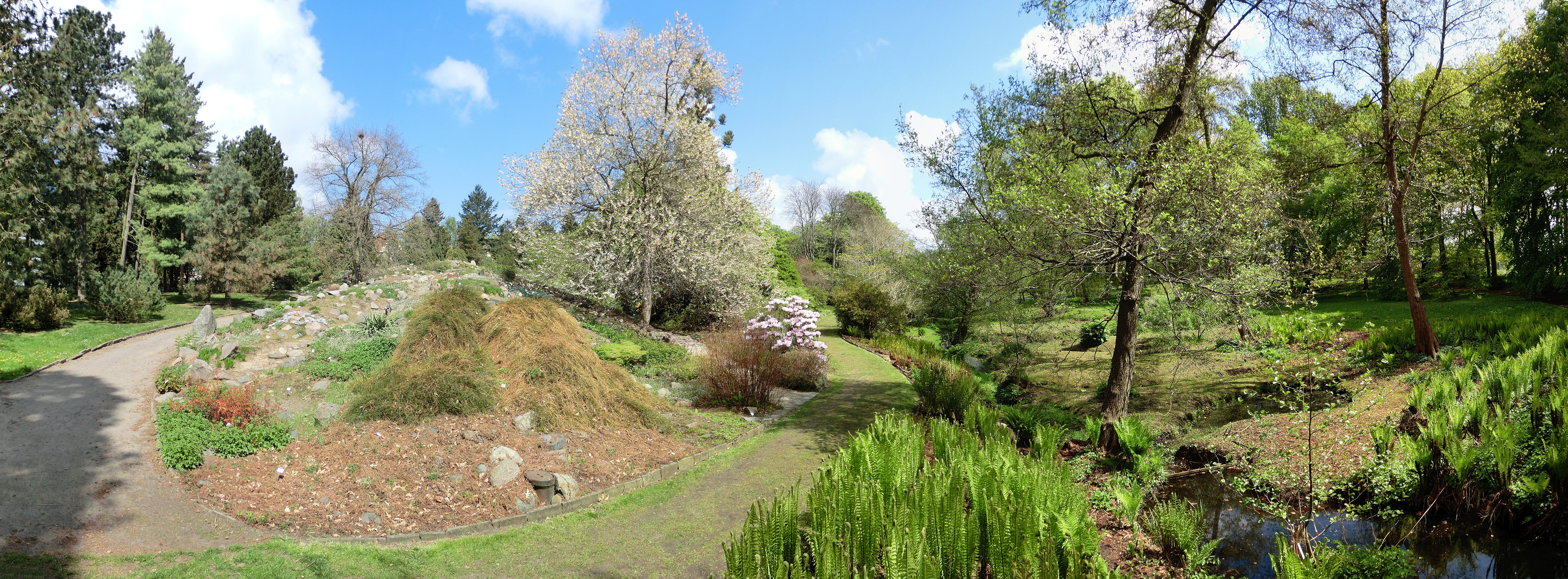
Historical Botanical Garden of Rostock University, greenhouse

Rostock is home to one of the oldest universities in the world. Founded in 1419, the University of Rostock is the third oldest university in Germany in continuous operation, and one of the oldest universities of the world. It also maintains a botanical garden, the Botanischer Garten Universität Rostock.

The Academy of Music and Theatre (Hochschule für Musik und Theater) offers graduate degrees in artistic fields. Founded in 1994, the institution combined Ernst Busch, the former drama school, and the outpost school of the Hanns Eisler Music School Berlin. Today, the combined school is a member of the Association of Baltic Academies of Music (ABAM), a union of 17 music conservatories at the Baltic Sea and Israel. Unique in Europe is the postgraduate degree in piano duo performance. The school possesses a large opera stage (Katharinensaal) and two chamber music halls. There are concerts every day throughout the year.

Rostock also hosts the Max Planck Institute for Demographic Research and the Leibniz Institute for Catalysis, as well as two branches of Fraunhofer Institutes, one for Computer Graphics and one for Large Structures in Production Technology.

== Culture ==
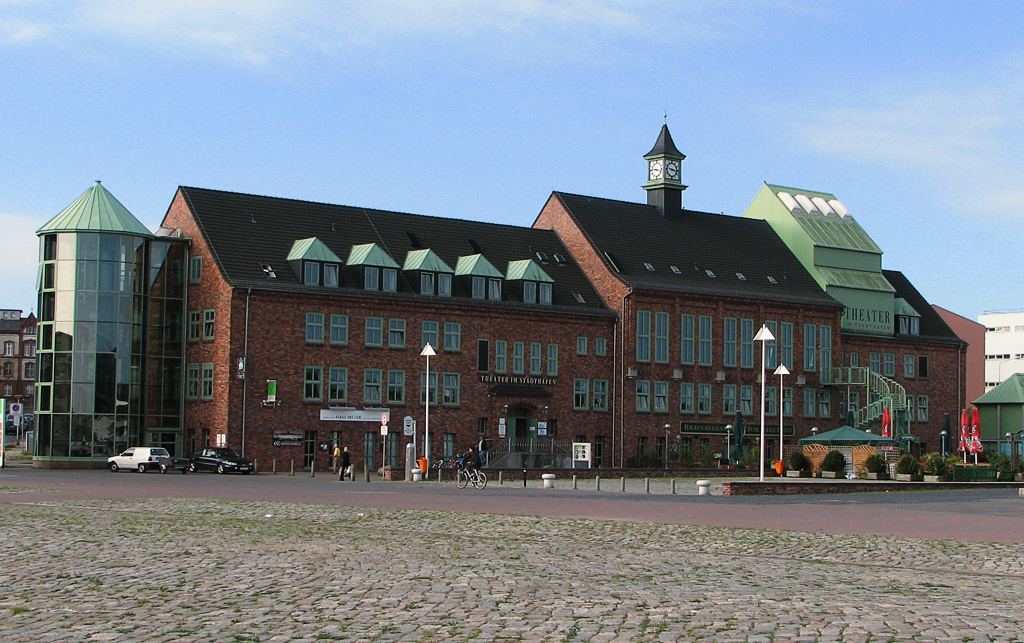
Volkstheater Rostock

=== Theatre ===
The municipal theatre is the Volkstheater Rostock where the Norddeutsche Philharmonie Rostock plays.

=== Events ===
The city is home to the annual Hanse Sail festival, during which many large sailing ships and museum vessels are brought out to sea, drawing over 1.5 million visitors.

An annual jazz festival, Ostsee-Jazz ("Baltic Sea Jazz"), takes place in June.

=== Cinemas ===
The Lichtspieltheater Wundervoll is the art house cinema of Rostock. It opened in 1993 and offers a daily programme in two venues, the Metropol and the Frieda 23 with three cinemas. At Frieda 23 is the Institut für neue Medien (IFNM), Rostock's Institute for New Media, which includes a media workshop. Both Liwu and IFNM are active members of the Landesverband Filmkommunikation Mecklenburg-Vorpommern. Special screenings for schools, educational programmes and special programmes are offered as well. It is the central venue for Rostock's Film Festival, the Festival im Stadthafen (FISH), the German Federal Festival for Young German Film.

=== Museums and zoo ===
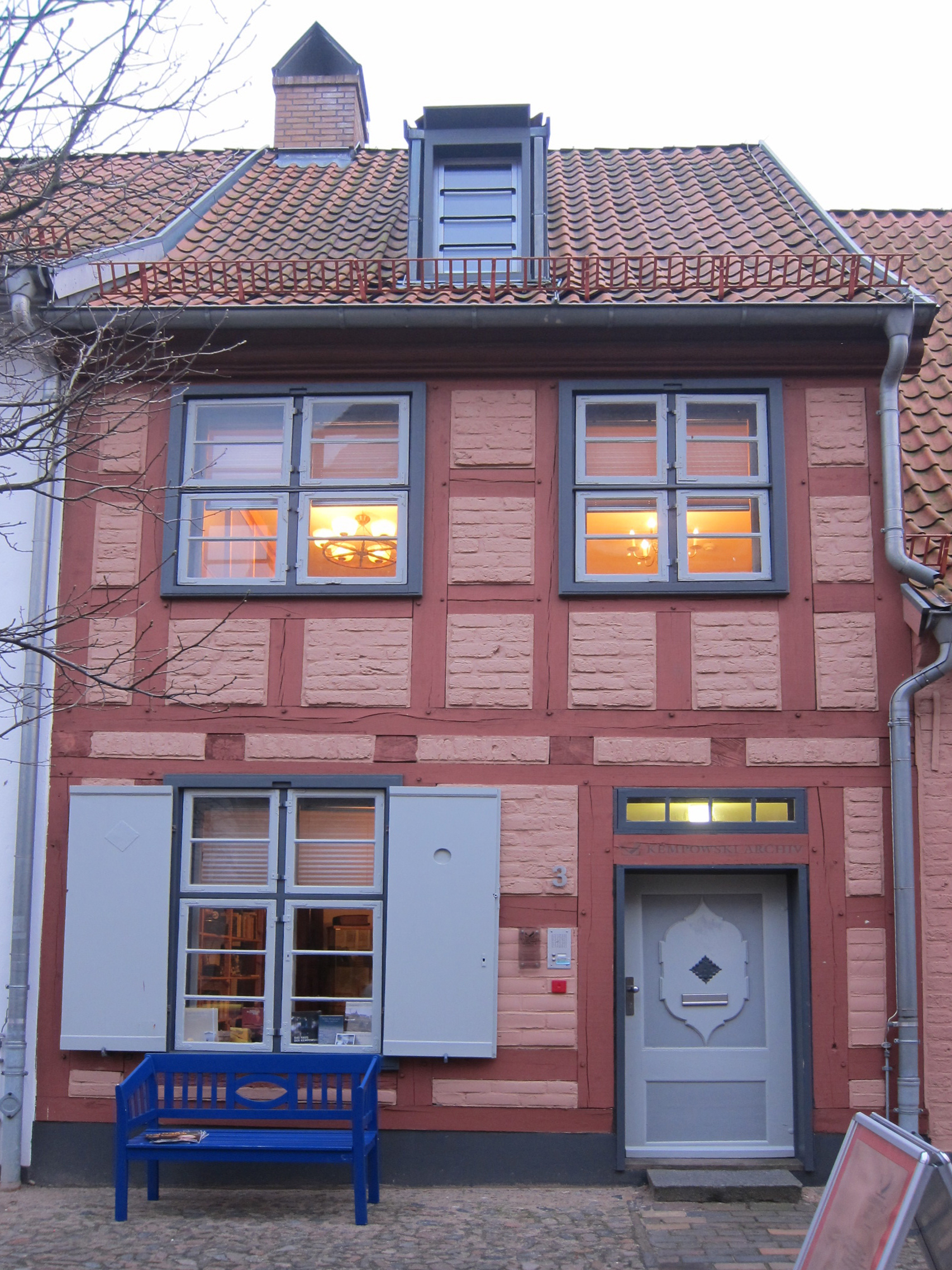
Walter Kempowski archives

- Rostock Art Gallery (Kunsthalle Rostock)
- Museum of Cultural History (Kulturhistorisches Museum)
- Stasi Museum (Dokumentations- und Gedenkstätte der Bundesbeauftragten für die Unterlagen des Staatssicherheitsdienstes der ehemaligen Deutschen Demokratischen Republik)
- Warnemünde Local History Museum (Heimatmuseum Warnemünde)
- Shipbuilding and Shipping Museum (Schiffbau- und Schifffahrtsmuseum)
- Rostock Zoo
- Walter Kempowski Archive
- Max-Samuel-Haus, Rostock Jewish Heritage Centre

=== Food and drink ===
Rostock manufactures its own local beer, called Rostocker Pilsner, manufactured at the Hanseatische Brauerei Rostock GmbH (Rostock Hanseatic Brewery Ltd.). The beer is well known throughout the city and is also sold in cities nearby. To celebrate Rostock's 800th birthday, a special light beer called Heller Freude was brewed to commemorate the occasion.

=== Sport ===
Hansa Rostock is the most popular sports club from Rostock. In the 2025–26 season, Hansa recorded an average home attendance of 24,948 across 17 home matches, the highest in the 3. Liga.

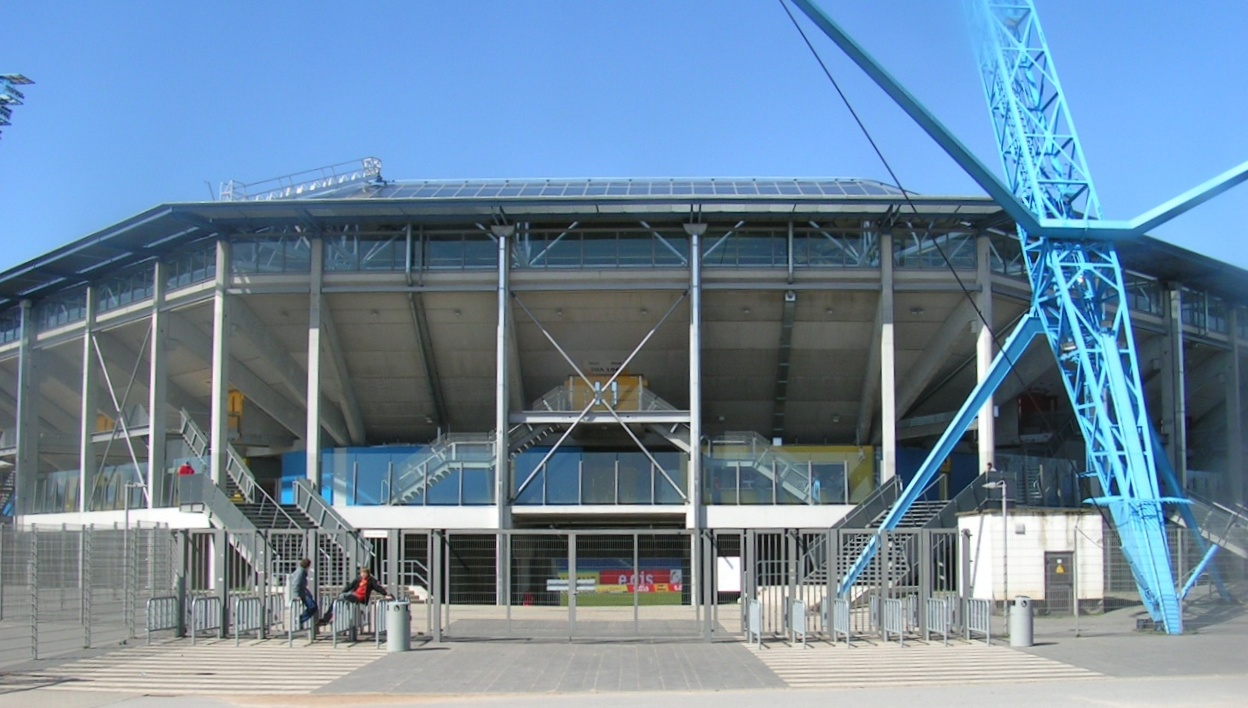
Ostseestadion, home ground of Hansa Rostock

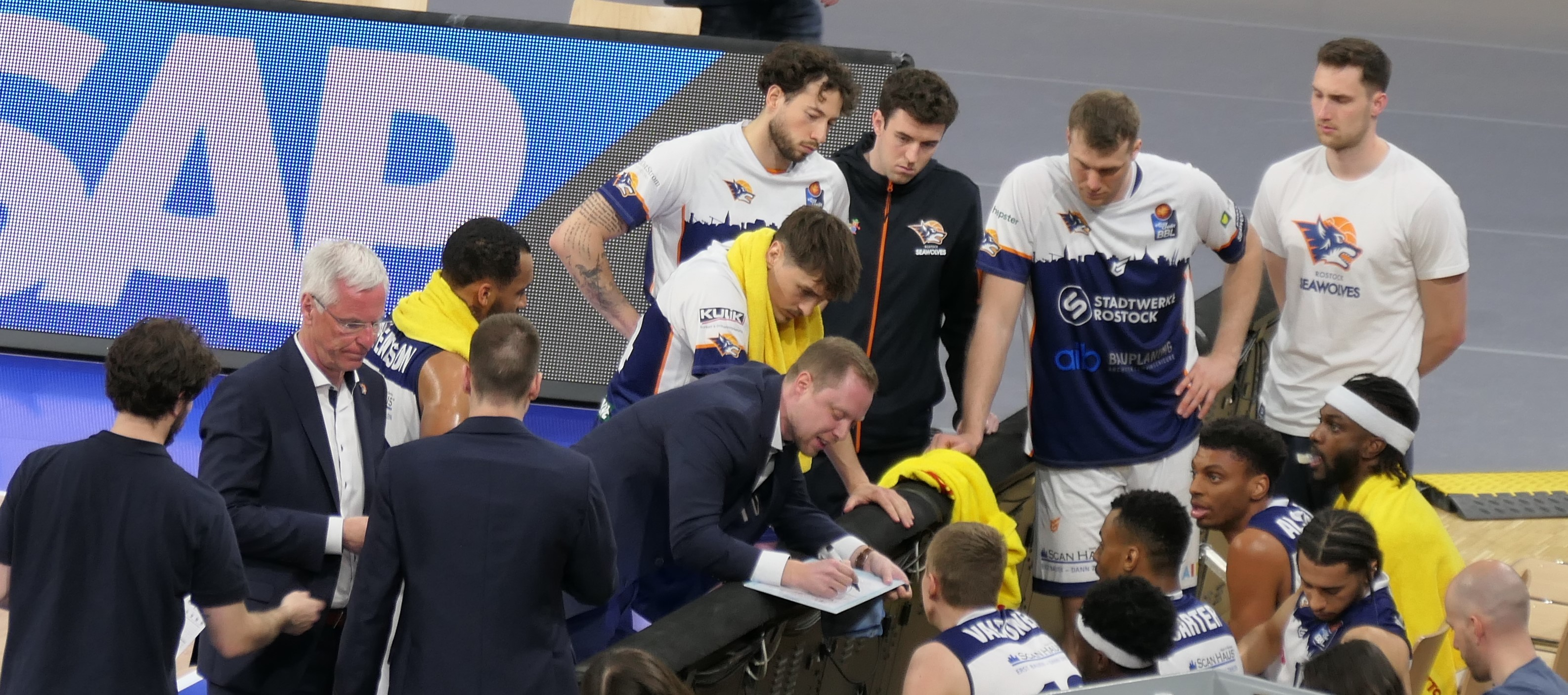
Rostock Seawolves huddle in April 2023.

Club	Sport	Founded	League	Venue	Head coach	Website
Hansa Rostock	Football	1965	3. Liga	Ostseestadion	Bernd Hollerbach	
Rostock Seawolves	Basketball	1994	Basketball Bundesliga	Stadthalle Rostock	Przemyslaw Frasunkiewicz	
Rostocker FC 1895	Football	1895	NOFV-Oberliga Nord (5th division)	Sportpark am Damerower Weg	Jan Kistenmacher	
HC Empor Rostock	Team handball	1946	3. Bundesliga	Rostocker Stadthalle	Maik Handschke	
SV Warnemünde	Volleyball	1990	3rd league (men and women team)	Sporthalle Gerüstbauerring		
Piranhas Rostock	Ice hockey	1953	Oberliga (3rd division)	Eishalle Rostock	Henry Thom	
Rostocker Nasenbären	Skater hockey	2005	Inline-Skaterhockey-Bundesliga (1st league)	OSPA-Arena	Dimitri Kramarenko	
HSG Warnemünde	Water polo	1971	Oberliga SH-MV (3rd league)	Neptun-Schwimmhalle		

=== Media ===
Regional television and radio is provided by NDR which broadcast from both Hamburg and Schwerin. LOHRO is a community based station which is based in the city that broadcast on 90.2 FM and online. The local newspaper is served by the Ostsee-Zeitung.

== Transport ==
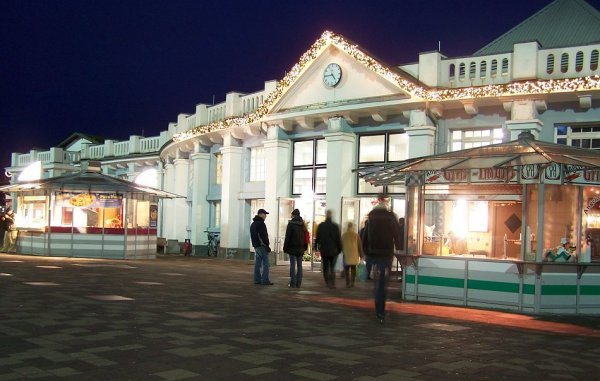
Rostock Hauptbahnhof (main station)

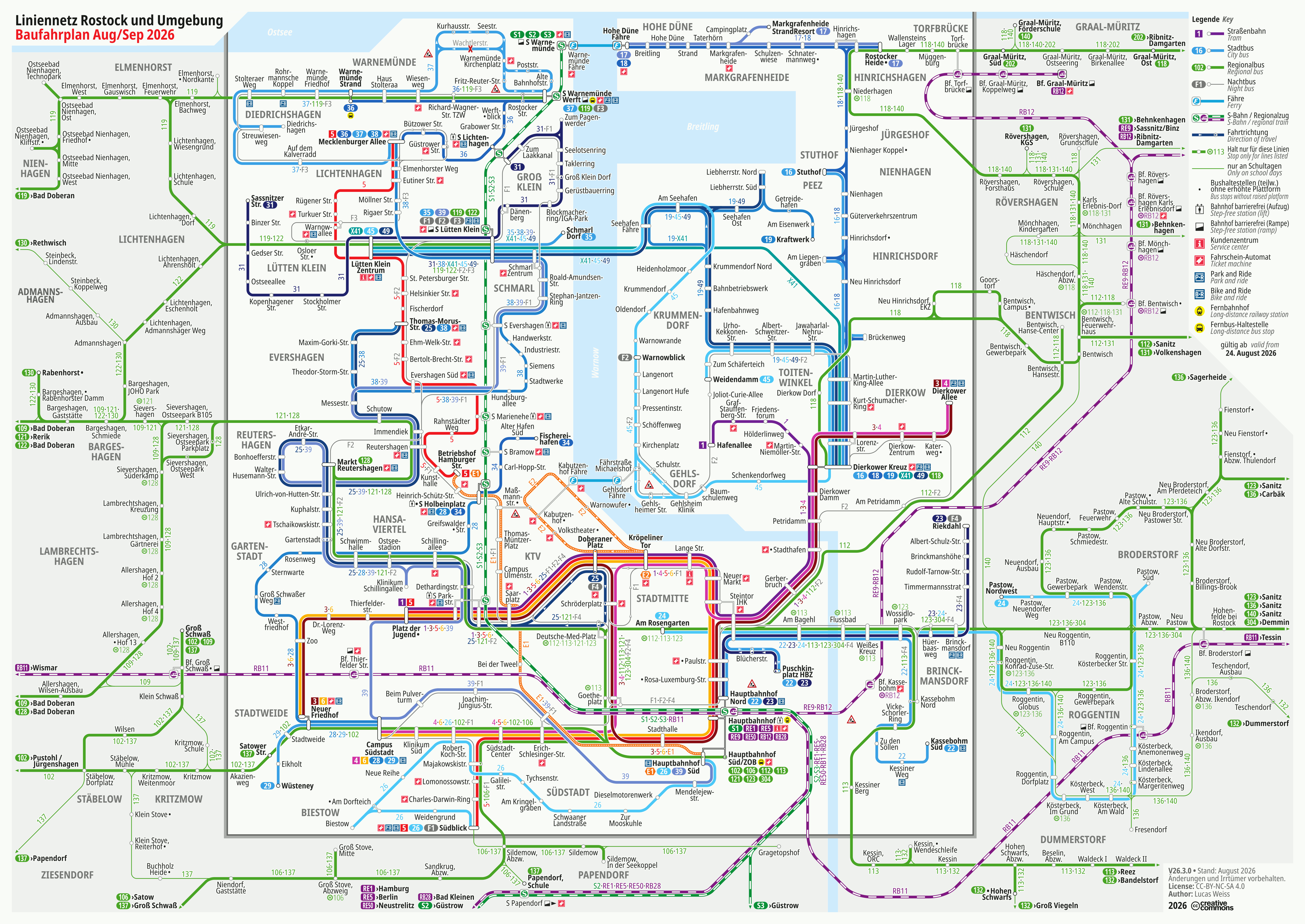
Transit map of Rostock

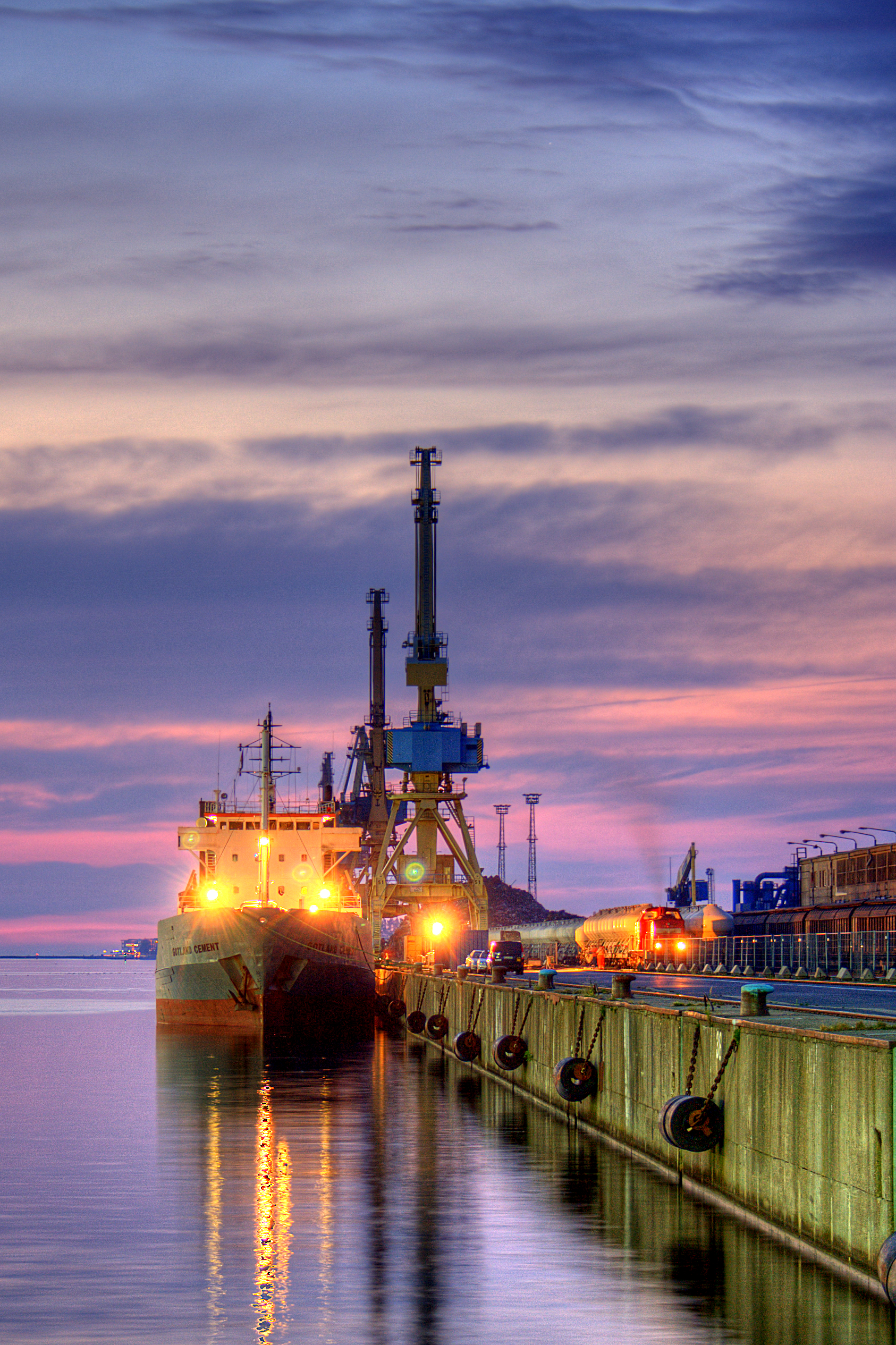
Rostock harbour at sunset

=== Car ===
Rostock can be reached by motorway (Autobahn) A 1 from Hamburg via Lübeck on A 20 and by A 19 from Berlin and A 20 from Szczecin in Poland.

=== Public transport ===
Rostock Hauptbahnhof offers fast rail connections to Hamburg and Berlin and from there to almost any other European city.

Rostock is served by the Rostock tramway network, with six tram lines that serve the inner city as well as the suburbs. The city is also served by an extensive bus fleet, as well as a handful of ferries that cross the Warnow.

=== Ferry/ship ===
Rostock is Germany's largest Baltic port, and receives the highest number of cruise tourists in Germany every year. It is also home to a large ferry port, being a main base for ferry operators Scandlines and TT-Line, which both connect Rostock with major Scandinavian destinations. Ferries leave Rostock for Helsinki (Finland), Gedser (Denmark), and Trelleborg, Nynäshamn and Visby (Sweden).

=== Air ===
The Rostock–Laage Airport offers seasonal flights to Antalya Airport in Turkey. The nearest larger international airports are in Hamburg and Berlin. There are also a number of airfields for smaller aircraft, such as Purkshof.

Rostock is also directly connected to Berlin Brandenburg Airport by the IC 17.

== Twin towns and sister cities ==
Rostock is twinned with:

- Szczecin, Poland (1957)
- Turku, Finland (1959)
- Dunkirk, France (1960)
- Riga, Latvia (1961)
- Antwerp, Belgium (1963)
- Aarhus, Denmark (1964)
- Gothenburg, Sweden (1965)
- Bergen, Norway (1965)
- Rijeka, Croatia (1966)
- Varna, Bulgaria (1966)
- Bremen, Germany (1987)
- Dalian, China (1988)
- Raleigh, United States (2001)
- Guldborgsund, Denmark (2014)

== Notable people ==
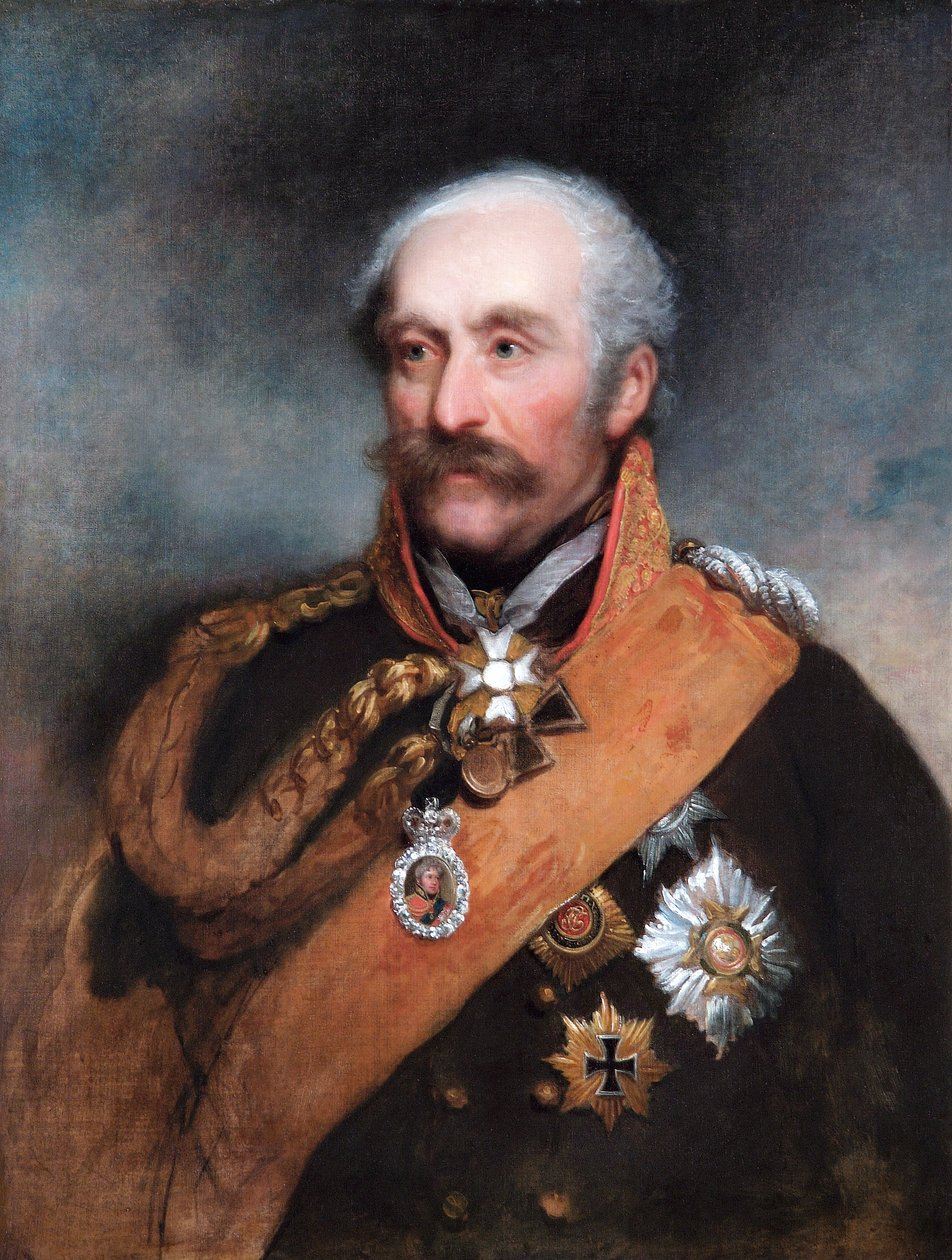
Gebhard Leberecht von Blücher, 1818

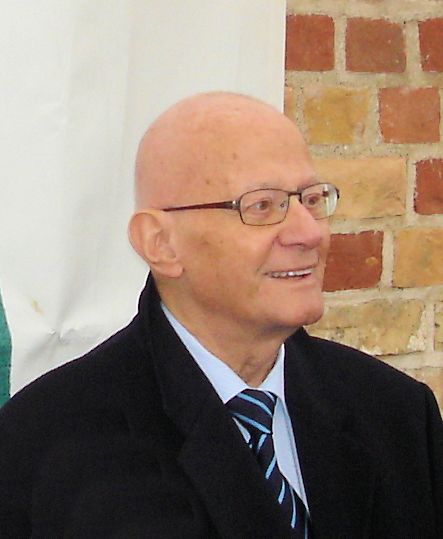
Peter Schulz, 2010

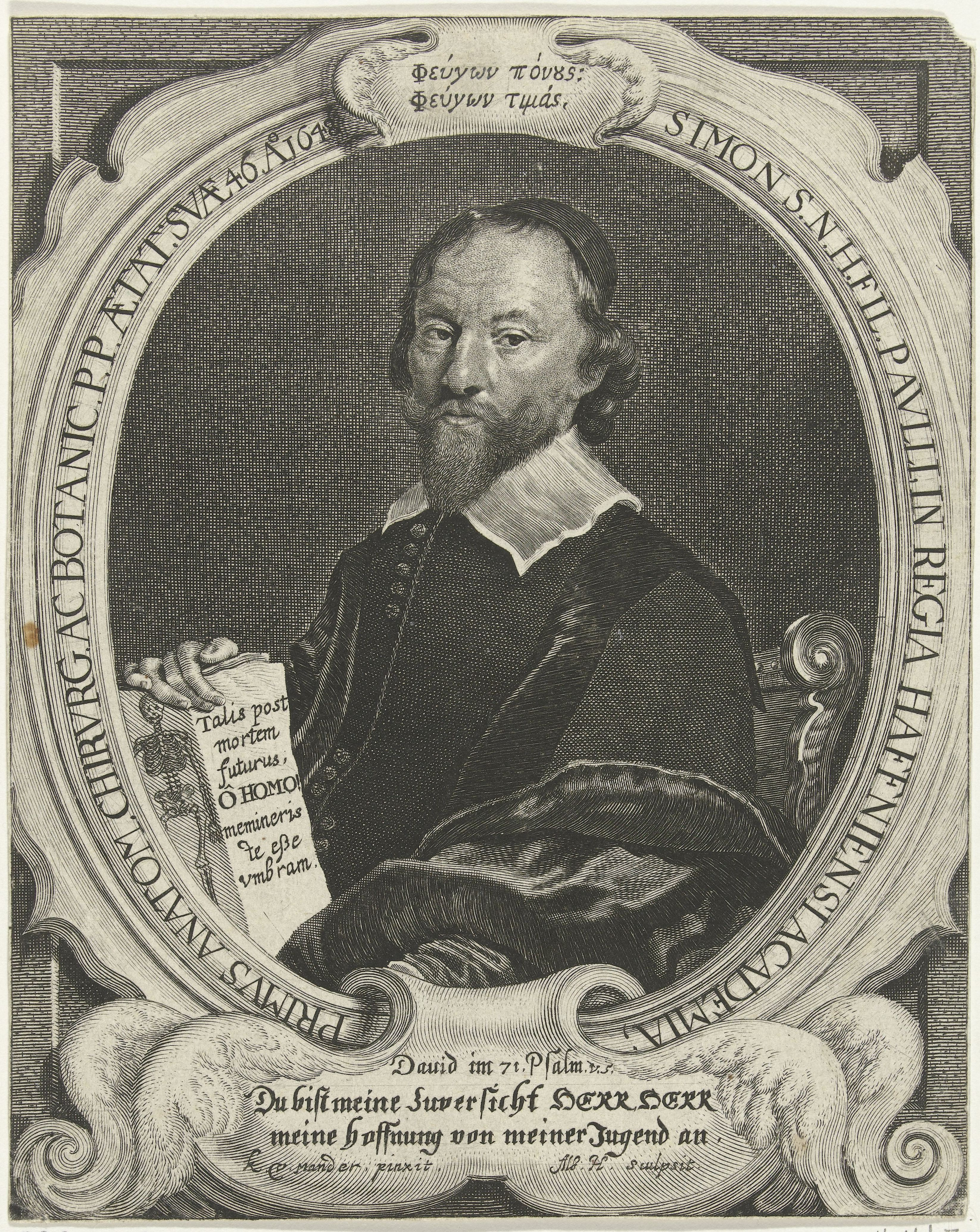
Simon Paulli, 1648

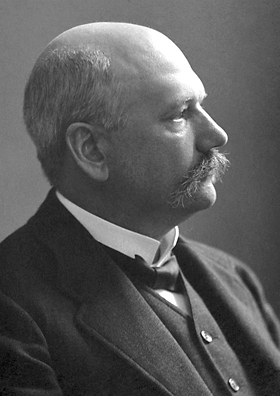
Albrecht Kossel

=== Public service & thinking ===
- Henry Borwin I, Lord of Mecklenburg (??–1227), Lord of Mecklenburg
- Carl Friedrich Behrens (1701–1750), German sailor and soldier, landed in Easter Island
- Franz Aepinus (1724–1802), German-Russian natural philosopher
- Gebhard Leberecht von Blücher (1742–1819), Prussian field marshal
- Moritz Wiggers (1816–1894), politician, lawyer and notary
- Rudolph Sohm (1841–1917), jurist, Church historian and theologian
- Mathilde Mann (1859–1925), prominent German translator and editor
- Carl Brockelmann (1868–1956), semiticist and orientalist
- Hans Paasche (1881–1920), politician and pacifist
- Ernst Heinkel (1888–1958), aviation pioneer, worked in Warnemünde
- Erika Fuchs (1906–2005), translator
- Duchess Woizlawa Feodora of Mecklenburg (1918–2019), member of the House of Mecklenburg-Schwerin
- Berndt von Staden (1919–2014), diplomat, Ambassador to the United States 1973–1979
- Peter Schulz (1930–2013), politician (SPD) and first Mayor of Hamburg 1971–1974
- Klaus Kilimann (born 1938), politician (SPD), physicist and Mayor of Rostock 1990–1993
- Joachim Gauck (born 1940), politician, civil rights activist and President of Germany 2012–2017
- Heinz Eggert (born 1946), theologian and CDU politician
- Stefanie Drese (born 1976), politician (SPD)
- Eva-Maria Kröger (born 1982), politician, Mayor of Rostock since February 2023

=== Science and academia ===
- Tycho Brahe (1546–1601), Danish astronomer and alchemist. Student and scientist at the University of Rostock.
- Simon Paulli (1603–1680), Danish physician and naturalist
- Matthias Christian Sprengel (1746–1803), geographer and historian
- Christian Martin Frähn (1782–1851), German-Russian numismatist and historian
- Sir Ferdinand Jacob Heinrich von Mueller (1825–1896), German-Australian physician, geographer and botanist
- Clara Wehl (1833–1901), Australian botanist
- Johann Georg Noel Dragendorff (1836–1898), pharmacist and chemist
- Hermann von Maltzan (1843–1891), malacologist, worked in the field of conchology
- Albrecht Kossel (1853–1927), biochemist and pioneer in genetics, recipient of 1910 Nobel Prize in Physiology or Medicine for determining the chemical composition of nucleic acids
- Paul Walden (1863–1957), Latvian-German chemist, lived and worked in Rostock
- Gustav Mie (1868–1957), physicist, worked on electromagnetic waves
- Karl Leo Heinrich Lehmann (1894–1960), American art historian, archaeologist and professor
- Arthur R. von Hippel (1898–2003), German-American materials scientist and physicist
- Hans von Ohain (1911–1998), physicist and engineer, worked in Warnemünde
- Egbert Brieskorn (1936–2013), mathematician who introduced Brieskorn spheres
- Sibylle Günter (born 1964), theoretical physicist, since 2011 heads the Max Planck Institute for Plasma Physics

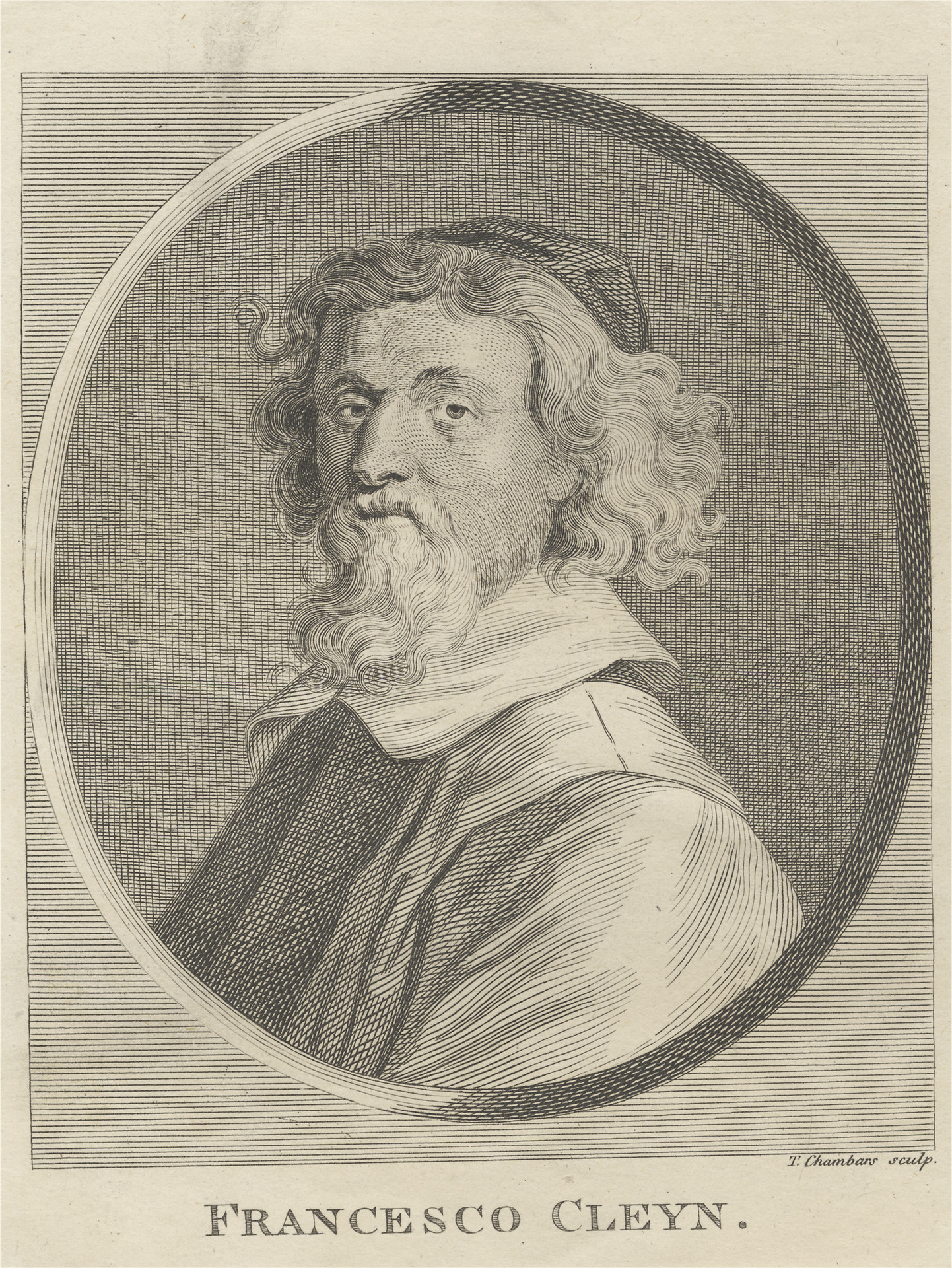
Francis Cleyn

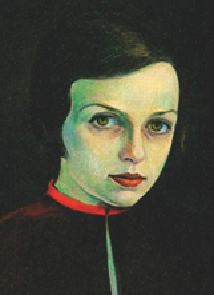
Dörte Helm, pre-1941

=== The Arts ===
- Francis Cleyn (c. 1582 – 1658), painter and tapestry designer
- Johann Heinrich Bartholomäus Walther (1734–1802), Baltic-German architect, worked in Tartu
- John Brinckman (1814–1870), poet and short story writer in Low German
- Brothers Friedrich Eggers (1819-1872, art historian & Karl Eggers (1826–1900), lyric poet
- Paul Tischbein (1820–1874), illustrator and painter primarily of landscapes; part of the Tischbein family
- Adolf Wilbrandt (1837–1911), German novelist and dramatist
- Edvard Munch (1863–1944), Norwegian painter, lived in Rostock 1907/08
- Heinrich Tessenow (1876–1950), architect, professor and urban planner
- Paul Wallat (1879–1964), landscape artist, draftsman and sculptor
- Margarete Scheel (1881–1969), artist, specializing in sculpture and ceramics
- Bruno Gimpel, (DE Wiki) (1886–1943), painter and illustrator
- Egon Tschirch (1889–1948), painter and illustrator.
- Dörte Helm (1898–1941), Bauhaus artist, painter and graphic designer
- Jessie Rindom (1903–1981), Danish film actress
- Marianne Hoppe (1909–2002), actress
- Peter Borgelt (1927–1994), actor
- Jo Jastram (1928–2011), sculptor
- Walter Kempowski (1929–2007), writer
- Erik Smith (1931–2004), British record producer, pianist and harpsichordist
- Mario Frank (born 1958), writer, CEO of Der Spiegel 2007/8; now a political biographer
- Franziska Knuppe (born 1974), fashion model
- Hinnerk Schönemann (born 1974), actor
- Marteria (born 1982), hip hop artist
- Vicke Schorler (born 1560), German merchant

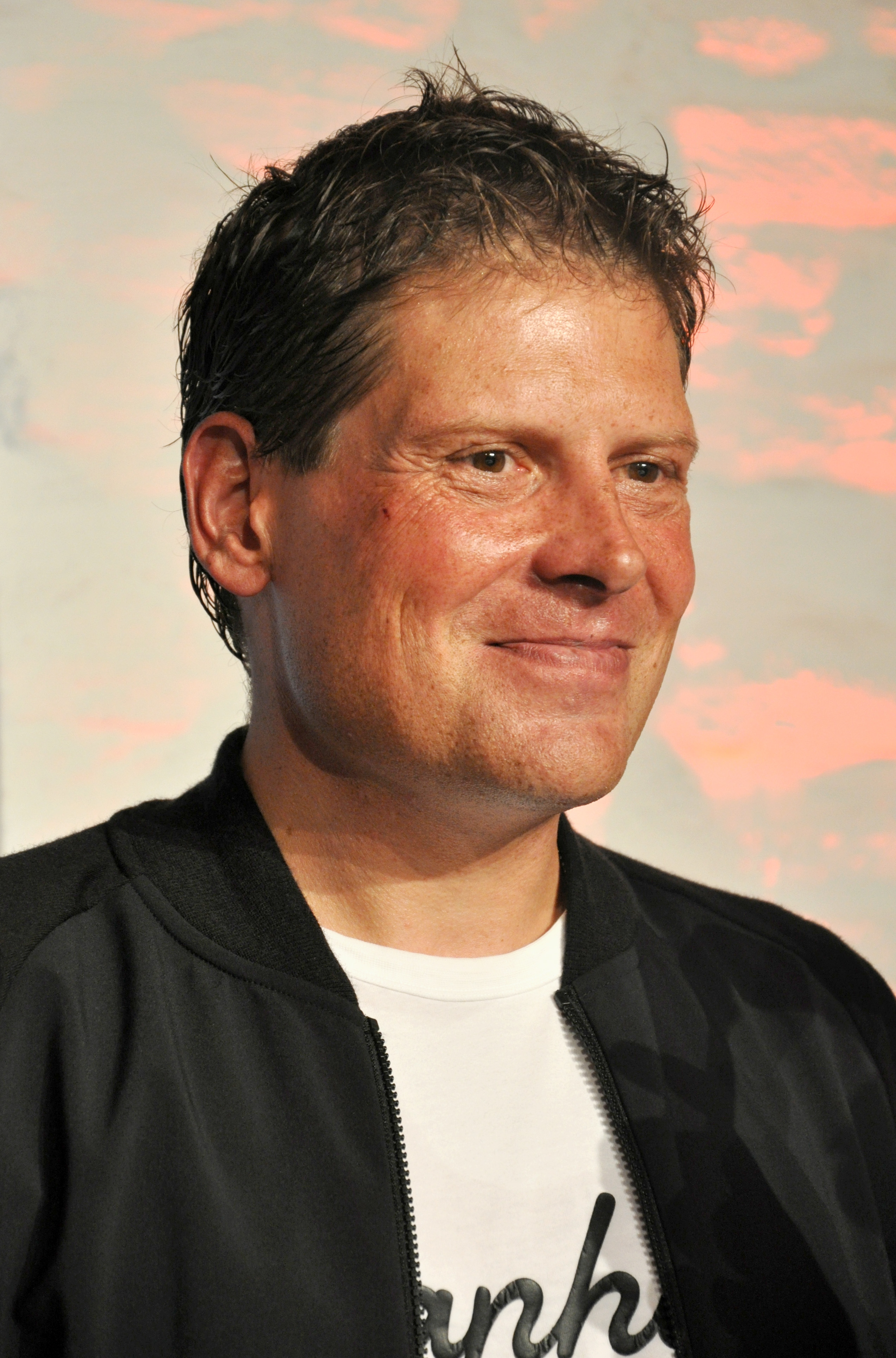
Jan Ullrich, 2016

=== Sports ===
- Friedrich Wilhelm Rahe (1888–1949), tennis and field hockey player
- Siegfried Brietzke (born 1952), German rower and Olympic team gold medallist
- Hansjörg Kunze (born 1959), track and field athlete, bronze medallist at the 1988 Summer Olympics
- Frank Rohde (born 1960), footballer and coach, played over 250 games and 42 for East Germany
- Martina Proeber (born 1963), diver, silver medallist at the 1980 Summer Olympics
- Christian Schenk (born 1965), decathlete, gold medallist at the 1988 Summer Olympics
- Ramona Portwich (born 1967), canoe sprinter and multiple team medallist at three Summer Olympics
- Andreas Tews (born 1968), flyweight boxer, won two medals at two Summer Olympics
- Jörn Lenz (born 1969), footballer who played over 430 games
- Jan Quast (born 1970), light flyweight boxer, bronze medallist at the 1992 Summer Olympics
- Steffen Baumgart (born 1972), football manager and former player who played 535 games
- Rolf Kohnert (born 1938), cyclist, 3 times Australian Masters Champion
- Jan Ullrich (born 1973), cyclist, Tour de France winner, won two medals at the 2000 Summer Olympics
- Dörte Lindner (born 1974), diver, bronze medallist at the 2000 Summer Olympics
- Annika Walter (born 1975), diver silver medallist at the 1996 Summer Olympics
- Britta Kamrau (born 1979), long-distance swimmer
- André Greipel (born 1982), road bicycle racer
- Jennifer Zietz (born 1983), footballer, played 278 games and 15 for Germany women
- Hannes Ocik (born 1991), rower, three-time world champion, twice an Olympic team silver medallist

== See also ==
- Music in Rostock
