= Max Samuel =

German businessman (1883–1942)

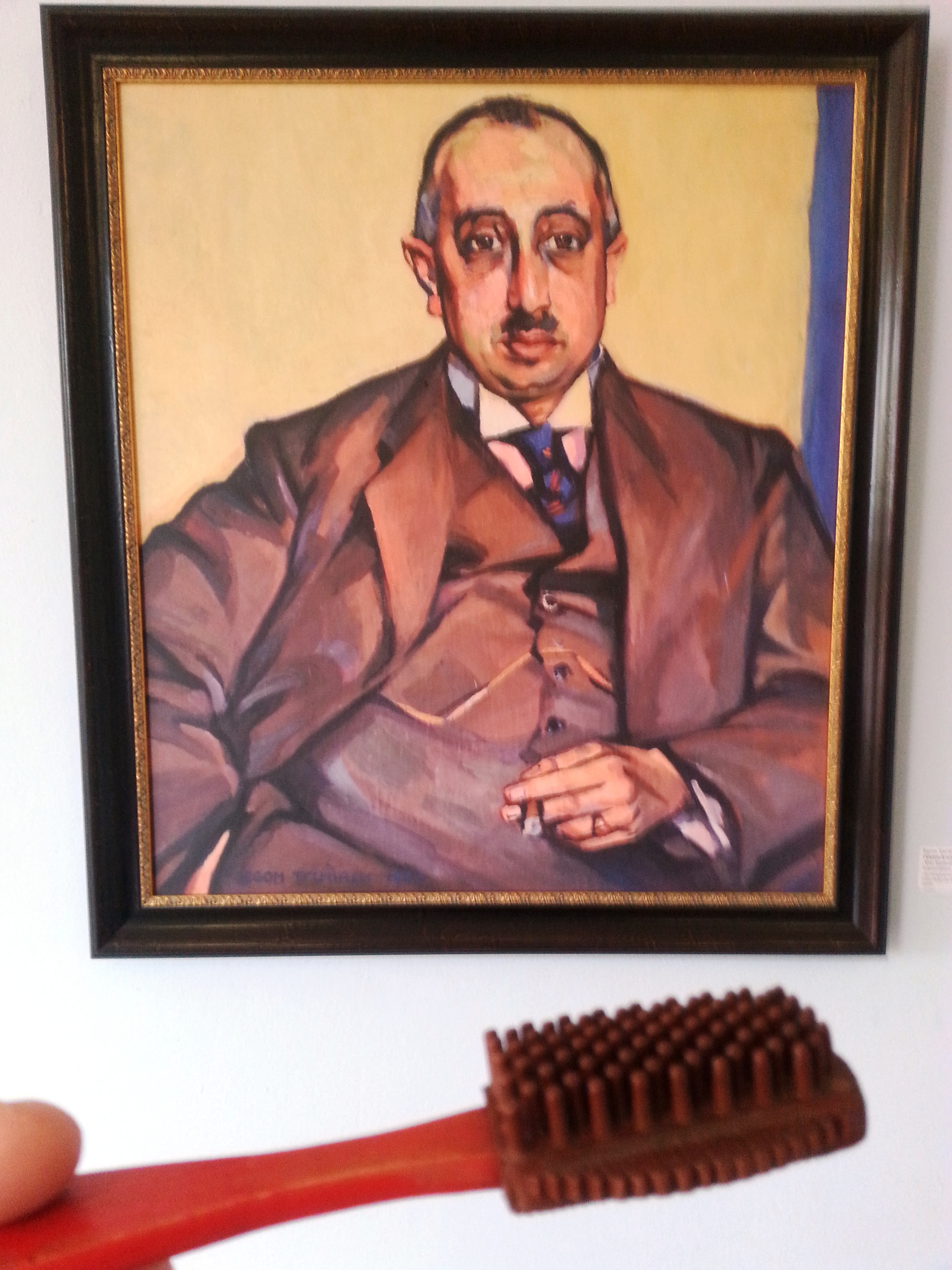
- Max Samuel as a 37-year-old with his invention, the suede rubber brush

Chair of the Rostock Israelite Congregation
- In office 1923–1938
- Preceded by: Siegmund Bernhard (1846–1934)
- Succeeded by: Arnold Bernhard (1886–1944)

President of the Israelite Upper Council of Mecklenburg(-Schwerin)
- In office 1930–1938
- Preceded by: Siegfried Silberstein (1866–1935)
- Succeeded by: Max Marcus (1876–1945)

Personal details
- Born: Max Itzig; 9 January 1883 Argenau, Kingdom of Prussia
- Died: 2 September 1942 (aged 59) Blackburn, England
- Resting place: Blackburn Old Cemetery, Jewish Section, Whalley New Road
- Citizenship: German (till 1941) stateless (after)
- Party: 1918–1930: German Democratic Party (DDP)
- Other political affiliations: 1930–1933: German State Party (DStP)
- Spouse: Berta Geßner (1878–1937)
- Children: Herbert Gerson (גֵּרְשׁוֹן) Samuel (1907–1992) and Käte (Kate) Gitel (גיטל) Kaiser (1910–1987)
- Parents: Jacob Itzig (1840–1918) (father); Rosalie Schrubski (1849–1934) (mother)
- Relatives: George Kaiser (grandson), Tim Blake Nelson (great-grandson)
- Education: apprenticeship in shoemaking and business
- Occupation: self-employed
- Profession: businessman
- Known for: rubber brush for suède
- Salary: ℛℳ 3,000 per month

Max Samuel (9 January 1883 – 2 September 1942) was a German businessman and self-made man, founder and managing-director of the EMSA-Werke, chair of the Jewish congregation in Rostock and head deputy of the Israelite Upper Council of Mecklenburg-Schwerin (board of deputies of Mecklenburg Jews).

== Life ==
=== Years until 1920 ===
Max Samuel was born into a poor family as penultimate child of seven siblings. His parents were Jacob Itzig (1840–1918) and Rosalie Schrubski (1849–1934). When Max was five years old the Itzig family altered its surname to Samuel, as on 2 June 1888 the Royal Bromberg Regional Government granted the family's request. He left primary education on Easter 1897 at the age of 14 and went to live and work with his elder brother James Samuel (1871–1933) in Güstrow (Grand Duchy of Mecklenburg-Schwerin) where the latter had opened a shoe business (Schuhwaarenhaus J. Samuel). In Güstrow Max Samuel was educated in the trades of shoemaking and business and then also worked as a travelling salesman.

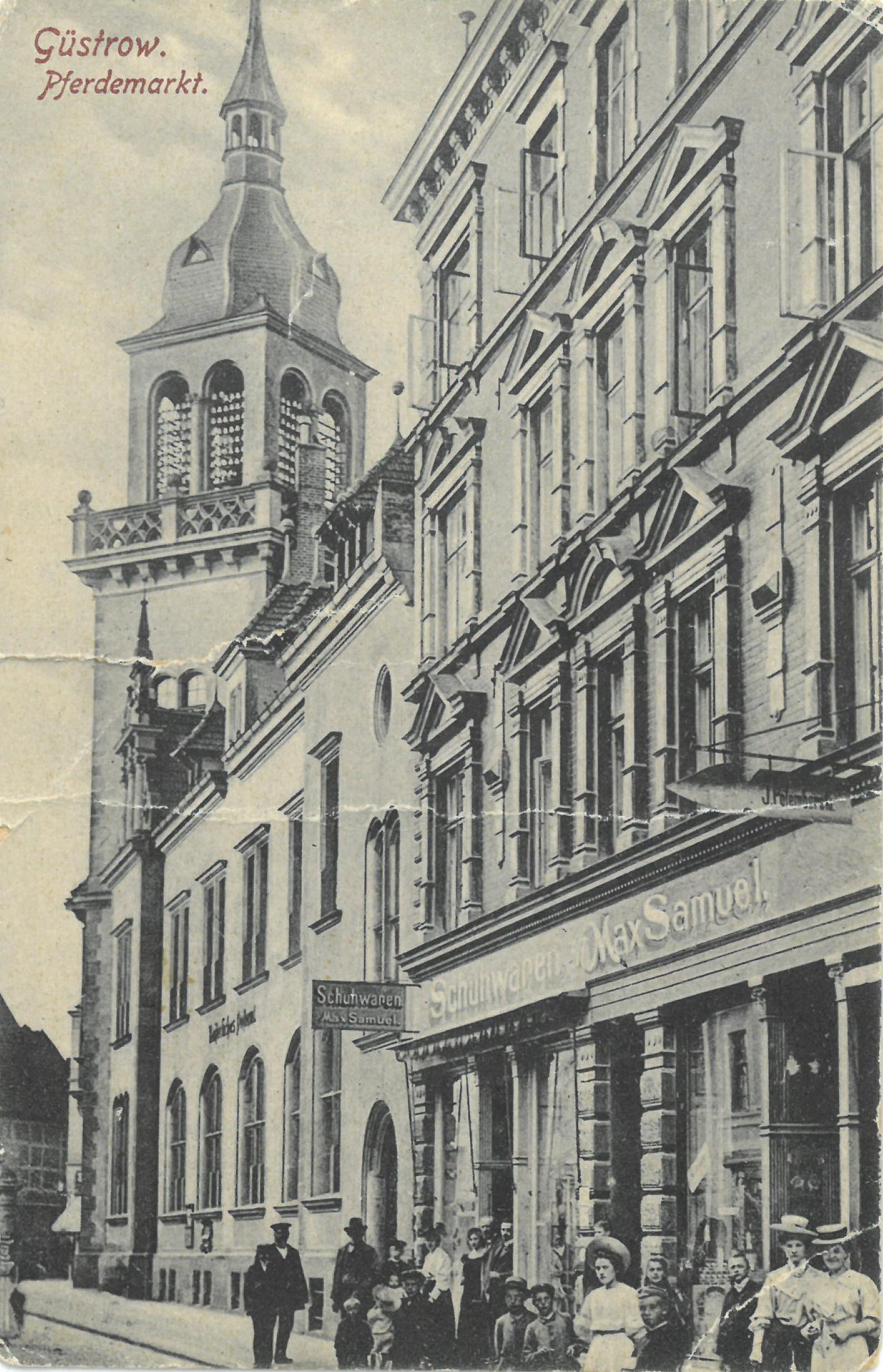
Max Samuel's shoe shop on Pferdemarkt 57 in Güstrow, by 1910

He was very ambitious and tried to develop many inventions using the early opportunity provided by his brother's shoemaking workshop. For example, in 1907 he invented a brush for maintaining suede shoes which was patented in Germany in 1926 and in the United States in 1931, as Max Samuel's business was export-oriented. Max Samuel called in specialists to contribute their medical or orthopedic expertise for new inventions, such as Willi Sawitz (1893–1957), Joseph May or Paul Lengemann.

On 1 June 1906 his brother gave him control of the shoe business which Max Samuel renamed the EMSA-Werke. Later that year Max Samuel and Berta Geßner (1878–1937) married, and their children, Herbert Gerson (גֵּרְשׁוֹן, transliterated Gershon; 1907–1992) and Käte Gitel (גיטל; 1910–1987; later Kate), were born in Güstrow. Rosa and Jacob Samuel came to Herbert's briss on 25 May 1907 to Güstrow, where they served as kvatters.

The conditions in Güstrow were not opportune for Max Samuel's expanding business. In 1916 he therefore rented a plot on Rostock's Friedrichstraße 28 in Rostock's Kröpeliner-Tor-Vorstadt neighbourhood and had his factory moved there, where, at the company's zenith, about 150 people were employed. On 17 October 1918 Max Samuel attended as groomsman his cousin Gustav Schrubski's (1879–1971) wedding with Toska Gunkel (1884–1967) in Stettin.

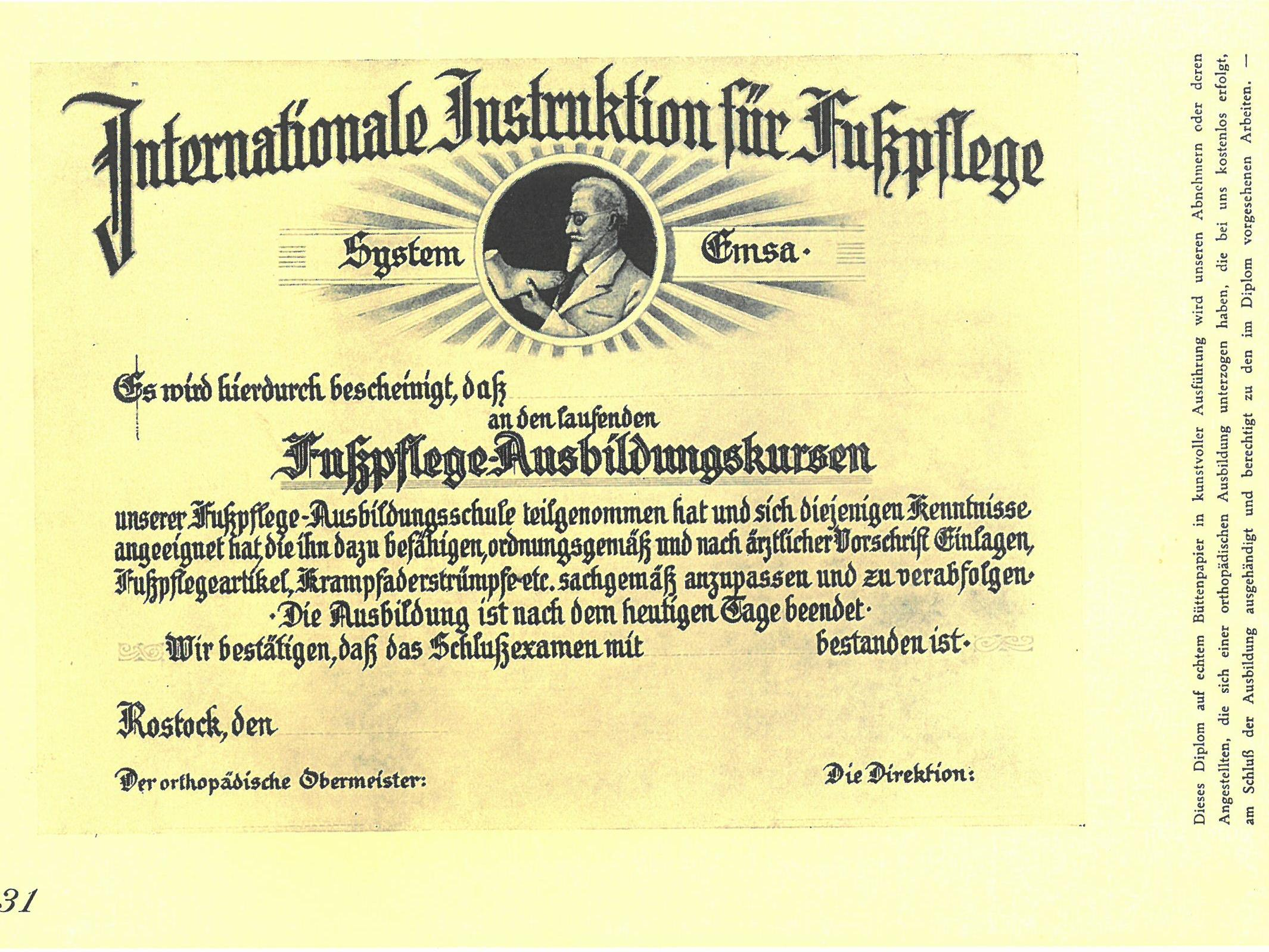
Notice for trainings by EMSA in its EMSA catalogue, 1931

In 1919 Max Samuel purchased the said premises on Friedrichstraße from their owner Kurt Orth. At the factory was also a training centre for salespeople, shoe artisans and chiropodists. Max Samuel usually concerned himself directly with factory matters.

At first the Samuels lived in a rented flat on Schröderstraße 20, as of 1919 they rented a flat in the house on Stephanstraße 8a on the corner of Schillerplatz. Their landlords there were Richard Siegmann (1872–1943, Theresienstadt) and his wife Margarete (née Salomon; 1881–1943, Theresienstadt). Richard Siegmann was the majority shareholder and director of the Rostocker Straßenbahn AG, running the trams in Rostock.

Max Samuel and Richard Siegmann became friends, and when in October 1919 Samuel had a dangerous car accident Siegmann replaced him as managing director till his reconvalescence in November 1920. On 11 April 1921 Samuel acquired from Gustav Adolf Reinbeck, lord of the manor of Röstenberg, as his home a villa at Schillerplatz 10 in Rostock which was erected in 1912 and designed by Paul Korff (1875–1945, suicide) for the professor of physiology Hans Winterstein (1879–1963). In the famine years during the war and the inflation, Max Samuel donated to supply emergency kitchens.

=== Max Samuel's commitment to humans and society ===
Max Samuel did not really observe the sabbath rest and did not maintain a kosher diet, but diligently avoided snubbing feelings of those who did, such as his father-in-law Jakob Geßner (1848–1937). However, he was very and authentically Jewish in appreciating and valuing human life, aiming to support, maintain, rescue, or protect it, he wanted to take away problems from humans so that they could truly live, thus he sanctified life, the highest Jewish value. According to Herbert, Max Samuel was very impulsive and generous, and he was excited by opportunities to help people. He was very compassionate and his sympathy could be quickly excited. In religious matters he wanted to support the troubled Jewish congregation, which – having lost all its savings in the inflation between 1914 and 1924 as so many private people and charities – was brought back into solvency with his financial acumen.

In January 1923, the Rostock Jewish Congregation (German: Israelitische Gemeinde Rostock) had amended its constitution, accounting for the separation of state and religion in Mecklenburg-Schwerin, as prescribed by her new constitution of April 1919, Constitution of the Free State of Mecklenburg-Schwerin (German: Verfassung des Freistaates Mecklenburg-Schwerin), mainly authored by the liberal Jewish lawyer Felix Löwenthal (1853–1929) from Schwerin in Mecklenburg. In February 1923 Max Samuel succeeded Siegmund Bernhard (1846–1934) as chair of Rostock's Jewish congregation which was the largest in the then two Mecklenburgs. He reformed the congregation's taxes (member dues).

While a businessman in Rostock, Max Samuel liked playing football with his dog (a competition he referred to as the dog team vs. EMSA-Werke). He wanted his children to be extensively educated, as he had left school at the age of 14 and did not want his children to experience that. Although he was not academically trained, he was very pragmatic and socially intelligent. As his granddaughter Ruth Kaiser Nelson recalled – when he had time for himself, he enjoyed being engrossed in reading newspapers. In politics he also joined and supported the new German Democratic Party (DDP), founded in 1918. In 1930 he was elected a member of Mecklenburg-Schwerin's five-person state executive committee of the German State Party (DStP) which was the DDP's successor.

He often had visitors in his home and enjoyed socialising. Every two weeks he collected an economic and political 'club' to his fireplace room for coffee, cognac, and cigars. This group was a circle of democrats, among them the liberal local chief postmaster Heinrich Greve (1868–1936), Ludwig Klein (insurance broker), Peter Emil Erichson (1881–1963; publisher und art patron), Leo Glaser (1876–1950; owner of the Haliflor perfume and cosmetics factory), Friedrich Carl Witte (1864–1938; chemical manufacturer), and seldom Otto Hörsing (Social Democratic Party of Germany [SPD]).

Occasionally joining them was Herbert Samuel's classmate and Greve's son Otto Heinrich Greve (1908–1968), who was then a member of the German central board of the Young Democrats (DDP's youth wing) and speaker of Rostock's General Students Committee. He later, as a lawyer and Lower Saxon delegate to the Parliamentary Council co-authored the West German constitution, the Grundgesetz, and was elected into the Bundestag for the SPD, strongly advocating the West German Wiedergutmachung legislation.

As the chair of Mecklenburg-Schwerin's biggest Jewish congregation (counting about 350 souls), directly elected for the first time in 1923 and re-elected for the last time on 17 February 1937, he managed to combine the German members of more liberal western mainstream Jewish observance, among which were many of Mecklenburg's long-established families, with the newcomers from Poland and Russia who were of more traditional Jewish leaning. These immigrants had been arriving since the 1890s, and there was an increase in immigration after the First World War.

Also the Mecklenburg-Schwerin Jewish estate, the 1764-founded Israelitische Landesgemeinde Mecklenburg-Schwerin, ILM (literally: Mecklenburg-Schwerin State(wide) Israelite Community), lost its status as an estate of the realm with semi-governmental authority thus needing constitutional reforms which started in 1924. So Max Samuel with Löwenthal, Siegmann and further allies, since long campaigning for all kinds of reforms in backward Mecklenburg, excelled in reconstituting the Israelitische Landesgemeinde Mecklenburg-Schwerin from a body of compulsory membership for all Jews in the pre-1918 Mecklenburg-Schwerin, into a statewide umbrella body of Jewish congregations of voluntary membership, but maintaining its statutory corporation status.

As part of the reforms, inspired by those of the Israelite Religious Community of Württemberg, the members were directly, instead of indirectly, represented in the umbrella body by its new 14-person general assembly (German: Israelitische Landesversammlung), established in 1926. ILM's four-person executive Israelite Upper Council (German: Israelitischer Oberrat, additionally the chief rabbi was an ex officio member), also established in 1764, became responsible to the new general assembly.

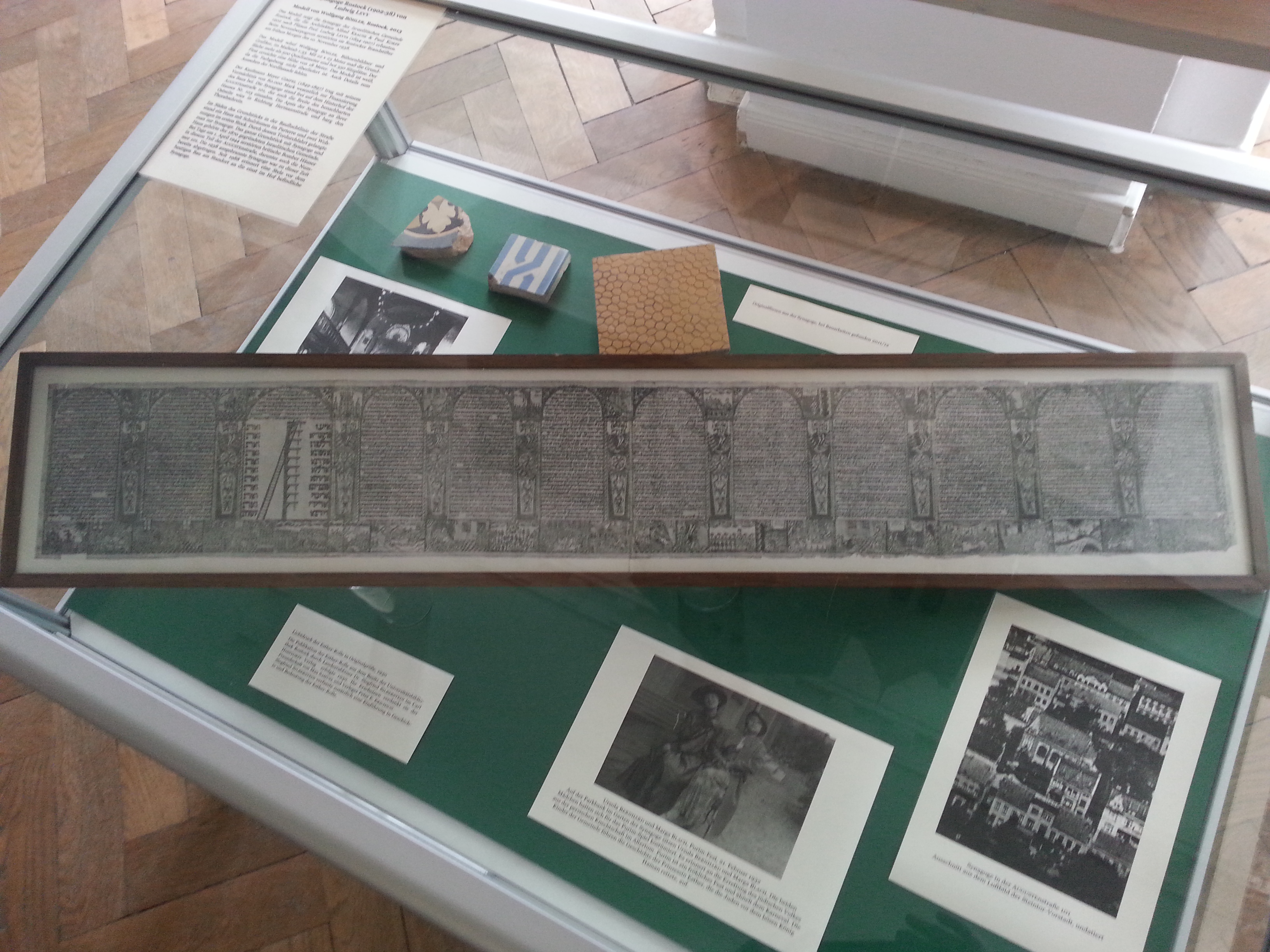
Reprint of the Megillath Esther which Max Samuel helped finance in 1930.

Inspired by Erichson, Max Samuel helped finance the 1930 reprint of the Esther Scroll which was originally printed in the 1700s and acquired for the Rostock university library through then chief librarian Oluf Gerhard Tychsen (1734–1815). Mecklenburg-Schwerin's chief rabbi and historian Siegfried Silberstein wrote the introduction to the reprint of this Megillath Esther. Another circle of friends consisted of city councillor Fritz Dahse (1876–1931), Richard Siegmann, director of Rostock's trams (1898 to 1919, and again 1920 to 1935) and coalyard accountant Otto Wiechmann, who met at the Samuels' house to listen to sports programmes with Max on his radio.

On 7 March 1926 Max Samuel won eight votes over five in the general assembly in Schwerin to decide the transferral of ILM's chief rabbinate (German: Landesrabbinat; from 1910 to 1934 held by Silberstein, 1866–1935) and upper council from Schwerin in Mecklenburg to Rostock. In 1929 he helped found the Jewish youth federation 'Ivria עִבְרִיָּה' in Rostock. In 1926 the general assembly elected him a deputy of the upper council, which again elected him its president in 1930, succeeding Silberstein, and once more for a second term until 1938.

As member, and later president of the Upper Council, Max Samuel was, for example, busy with protests at the Mecklenburg-Schwerin ministry of education against an anti-Semitic poem and image in the 1929-issued new reader for German lessons or welcoming Jewish intellectuals like Harry Torczyner (future Naftali Herz Tur-Sinai) at a seminar on Jewish Biblical exegesis at the foundation Akademische Gesellschaft Hausmann-Stiftung Arendsee in Arendsee in Mecklenburg in August 1932.

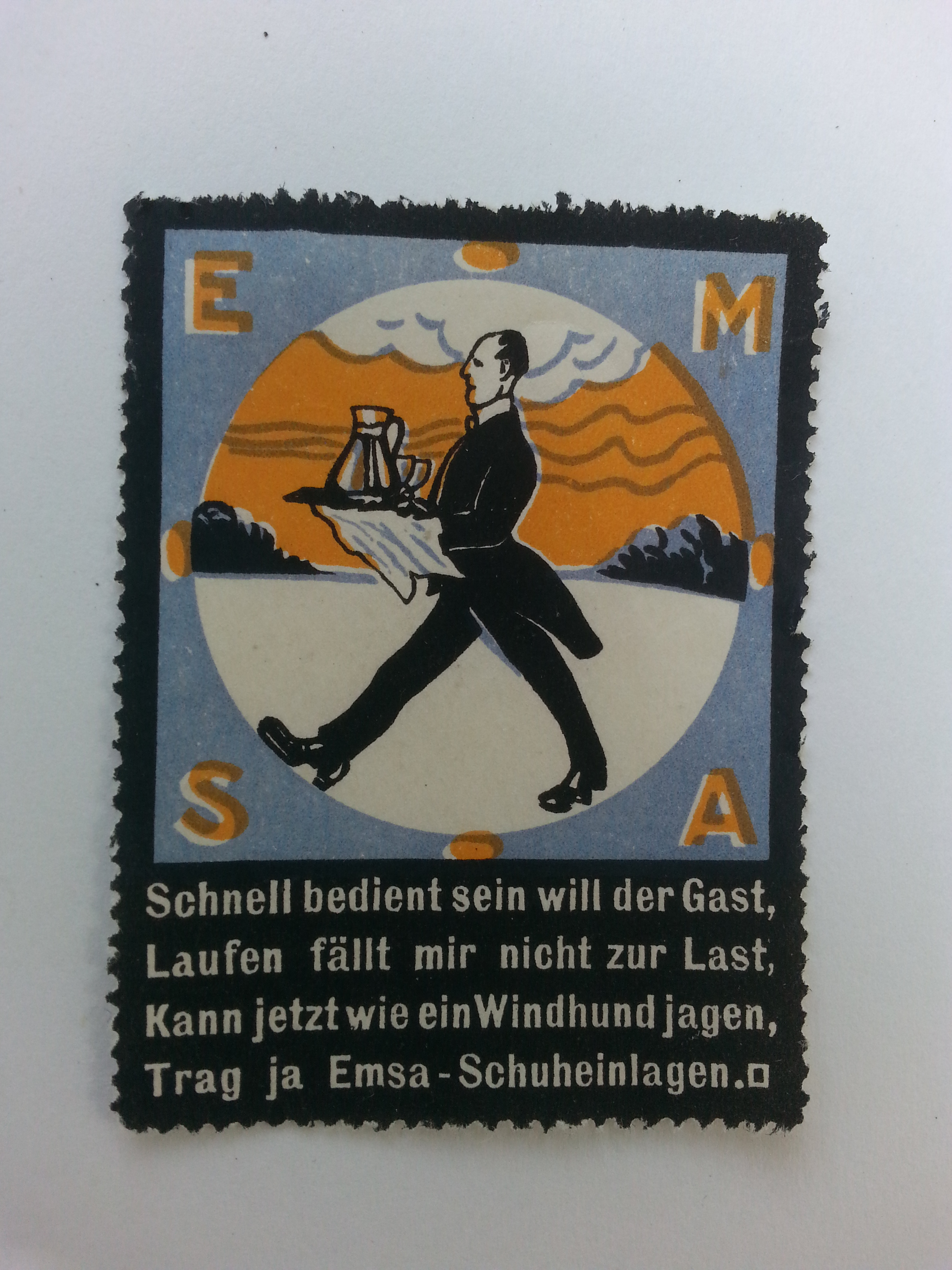
Poster stamp advertising EMSA's arch supports to waiters, 1930s

He was societally engaged via membership in the association of Rostock's University (German: Landes-Universitäts-Gesellschaft, a booster club, from 1927 to 1933) and the fraternity of businesspeople (German: Korporation der Kaufmannschaft, from 1918 to 1933). As head of the Rostock congregation Max Samuel called upon his fellow members to vote for Siegmann (Economic Party) in the elections for the Rostock city parliament on 13 November 1927.

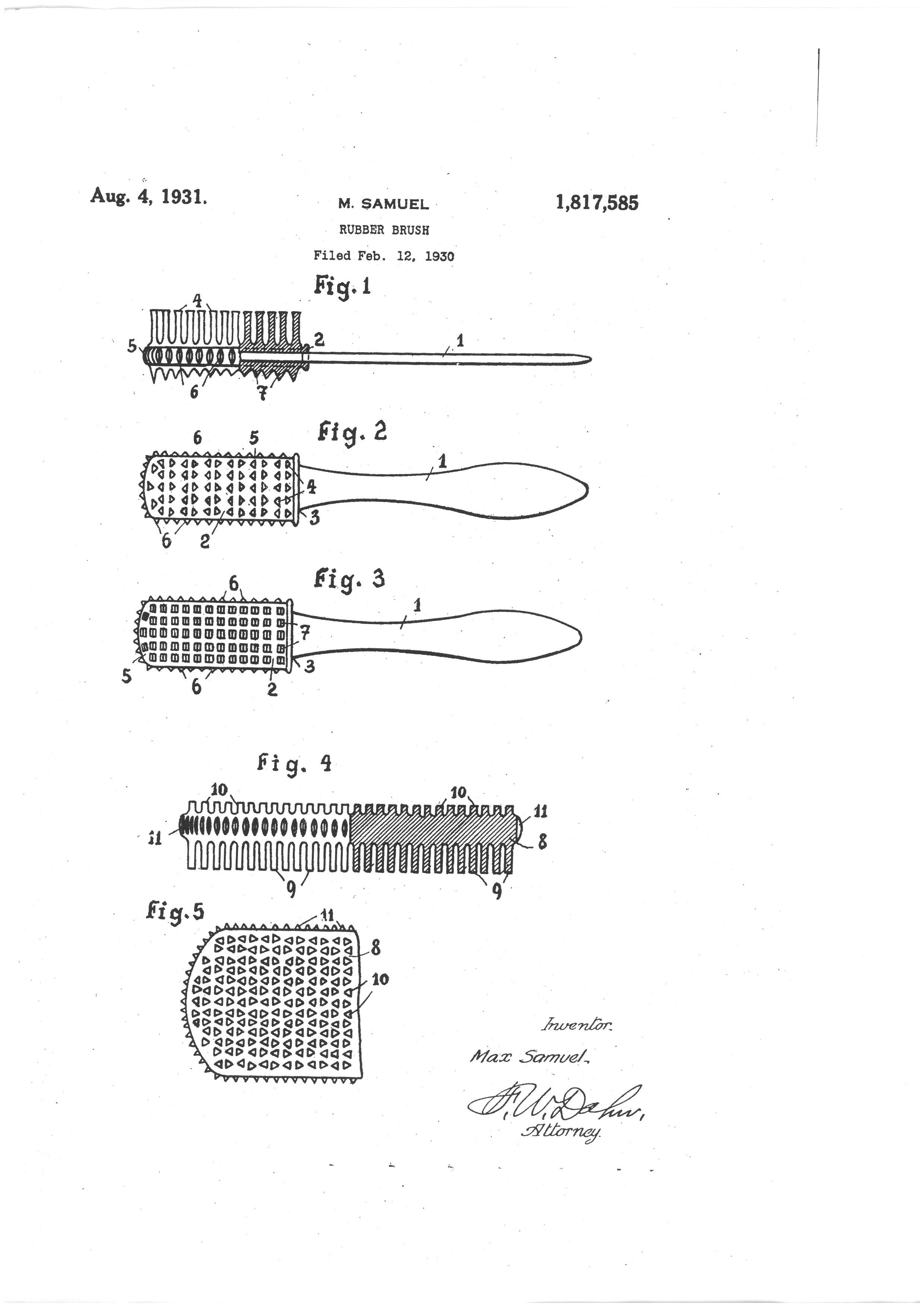
Sketches of the suede rubber brush from a 1931 patent specification

Just before the Great Depression, the EMSA-Werke exported items from a catalogue of hundreds of shoes, shoe accessories, and orthopedic devices to stores in, among other countries, Austria, Czechoslovakia, Palestine, Sweden, Switzerland, the United Kingdom, and the United States. On 23 June 1930 Max Samuel changed his private business into a stock company, but all the shares remained his private possession. In 1931 Max Samuel and his brother-in-law Hermann Geßner (1875–1950) travelled together to Italy. When in Rome both incapable of Italian, Geßner with his education in classical languages was unable to make himself understood whereas the practical Max Samuel succeeded communicating with shop assistants by gestures and mimics.

The EMSA-Werke suffered an economic decline during the Great Depression, but survived the crisis intact. Instead of firing staff, Max Samuel maintained the previous levels of employment and production, accumulating stocks and causing shrinking profits in 1931 and a net loss in 1932, the first ever recorded for EMSA, which Max Samuel compensated with reserve capital formed in earlier profitable years. He even helped other firms in calamities, such as Paul Bründel's Herren-Wäsche und feine Herren-Artikel on then Hopfenmarkt 3 (now named Kröpeliner Straße 20) in Rostock, which was a men's underwear shop patronised by Max Samuel.

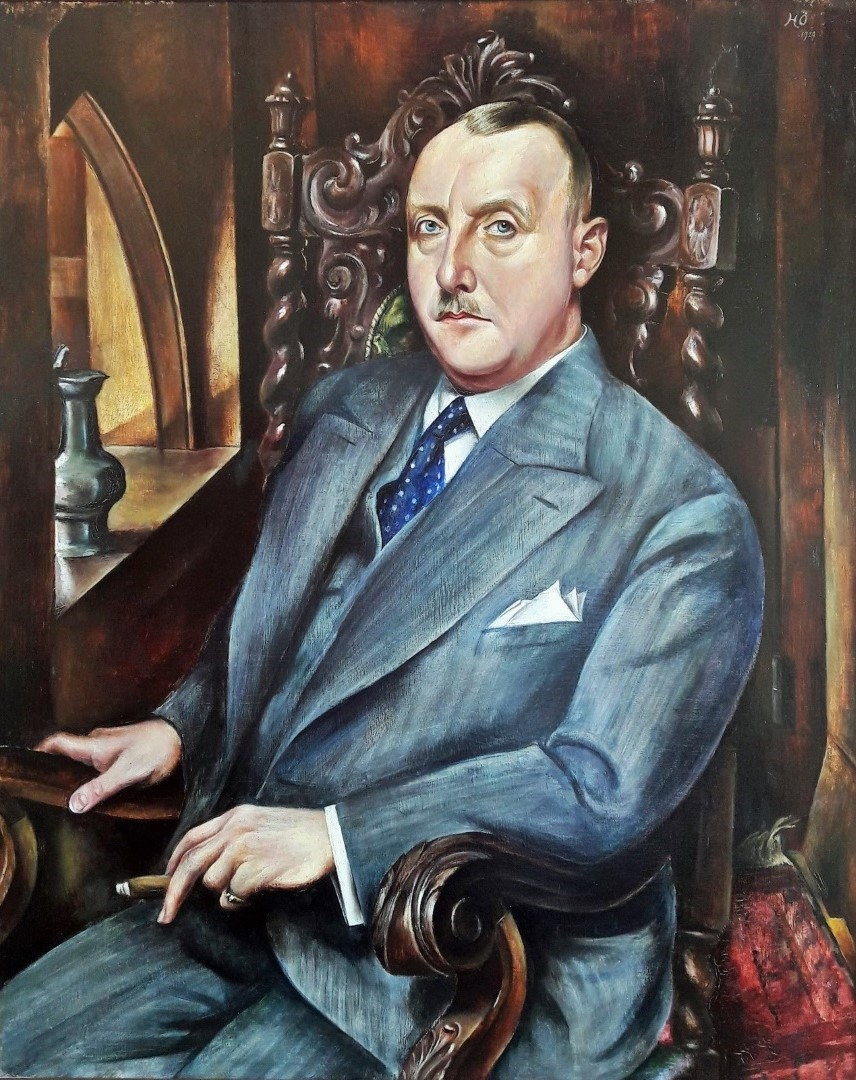
Senator Gustav Adolf Fuhrmann at home (Schillerplatz 9), 1929 by Hans Emil Oberländer

Berta Geßner, Max Samuel's wife, was very musically-oriented and well-read. She was the daughter of the teacher and hazzan Jakob Geßner, who, as a widower, had lived with his daughter and her husband since 1906. The Geßners were a well-educated, but rather poor, middle-class family from Lower Franconia. Thus she was still not considered worthy by old-established Mecklenburg Jews of manor-owning background, like the Samuels' neighbour Margarete Siegmann, née Salomon (1881–1943, Theresienstadt), wife of Richard Siegmann.

Despite this, the husbands of Margarete und Berta were friends. In 1932 Max Samuel employed as an unskilled office worker Richard's son Hans [John Bernard] Siegmann (1905–1992), who since 1923 had been unproductive and something like a perpetual student. The Samuels' relations with Lutheran neighbours, such as the Senator Gustav Adolf Fuhrmann (1881–1960) and his family in Schillerplatz 9, who had moved there in the 1920s, were friendly. The Fuhrmanns competed with the Siegmanns to annually host the best ball in Rostock's high society.

Also living near Schillerplatz were several other Jews, namely Leo Glaser (owner of the perfume company Haliflor and, between 1924 and 1928, president of the Mecklenburg Chamber of Commerce in Rostock), Prof. David Katz and Rosa Katz (1885–1976; pioneers of psychology at Rostock's University), Friedrich Rubensohn (lawyer), Richard Josephy (1890–1944; lawyer), and Franz Josephy (1893–1944, Auschwitz; lawyer), who had worked in Rostock, the venue of Mecklenburg's main courthouses. Rubensohn (1893–1978), an SPD-member, was also a colleague in the board of directors of Rostock's Jewish congregation and in the Israelite Upper Council.

=== Between 1933 and 1938 ===
On 21 February 1933 the Nazi government of the Free State of Mecklenburg-Schwerin, ministry of the interior, in office since 13 July 1932, banned the Mecklenburgische Blätter, a 1928-founded liberal biweekly magazine which Max Samuel helped finance and was edited by his friend Heinrich Greve (1868–1936), after it published an article critical of Hitler's government. Greve's lawyers Gustav Goldstaub (1878–1963) and Rubensohn could do nothing against this despite attempting to defend him.

After the Nazis' seizure of power in 1933, during the first weeks after issuing the Reichstag Fire Decree on 28 February, they intimidated their actual and alleged opponents with temporary arrests. Max Samuel's neighbour Rubensohn, who was warned by detective constable Meyer a few weeks after the Nazis came to power that he was in imminent danger because he was a social democrat (that is, a member of the SPD), fled with his son Eli Rubensohn and wife Alice, née Guggenheim, to her family in Basel and wrote a letter to Max Samuel on 18 March 1933.

In this letter he explained his flight and made clear his opinion that he had needed to flee due to being a social democrat, not due to being a Jew. He thought that Jews were not in such danger, and Max Samuel agreed in his answer on 21 March: “I think that as long as we live in a lawful state like Germany, which has been built on correctness for centuries and has a claim to culture, hardly anything serious can happen to us.” By the end of March 1933 the police had warned Max Samuel that he would be arrested, so he had to hide for some weeks with his friend Hörsing in Berlin.

The government-imposed segregation of Jews, even where not provided by new anti-Semitic laws, was often performed with preëmptive obedience, and this excluded Max Samuel from the university booster club and the fraternity of businesspeople. In April 1933 the Rostock tax office presented its demand for back taxes for the years 1927 and 1932, however, accelerating them for immediate execution and thus indicating how fast the treatment of Jewish taxpayers had changed. Therefore, the tax office charged a compulsory mortgage on Max Samuel's private villa on Schillerplatz 10.

At the same time his son-in-law Hermann Kaiser (1904–1992) was deprived of his attorney's certificate at the Berlin Kammergericht due to new anti-Semitic laws and joined the EMSA-Werke as Max Samuel's proxy agent and member of the company's supervisory board. Thus he and his wife Käte moved to Rostock, Alexandrinenstraße 8a. Max limited his societal activity to the Jewish community. As president of the upper council he was concerned with the maintenance and protection of Jewish graveyards in Mecklenburg, where congregations – mostly due to the general rural exodus of Mecklenburgers since the 1870s – had ceased to exist.

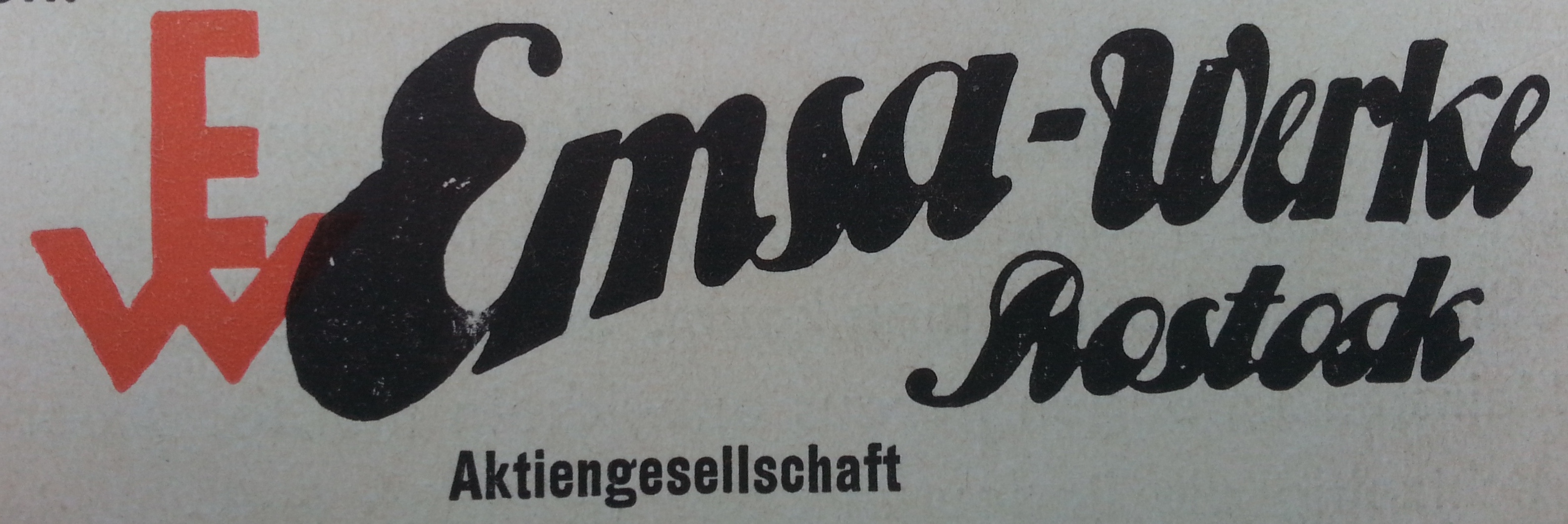
EMSA's signet

With the ever-increasing anti-Jewish legislation in prewar Nazi Germany, Max Samuel became very active in efforts to help persecuted Jews. The EMSA-Werke's audit report for 1934 reported that Max Samuel had given reichsmarks (ℛℳ) 19,000 in 'loans' which were to be written off, as they were meant to support fleeing Jewish Germans who would likely not be able to repay him.

Like other foreign-currency earning companies, the EMSA-Werke were obliged to provide the Nazi government with the convertible foreign exchange in return for inconvertible paper reichsmarks (ℛℳ). Due to this regulation, the EMSA-Werke did not see an increase in convertible currency even though export profits were rising. However, since the company could provide foreign exchange, it enjoyed a certain precarious protection from damaging arbitrary government acts.

In early 1934, Herbert, who was a graduate with a doctorate in law but – as a Jew – denied a career as a lawyer, had left Germany and was granted immigration to the United Kingdom on the grounds of investing and creating jobs in a poor area. Before emigrating he worked with his father to learn the trades of shoemaking and business. Herbert then founded in 1934 Herbert Foot Appliance Ltd., redistributing EMSA products received through S. Kogel leder en schoenfournituren (leather and shoe fittings), Amsterdam, EMSA's central distributor abroad.

Max Samuel advised hundreds of people seeking consultation (sometimes ten per day) and helped them acquire foreign currencies or immigration papers to refuge countries. He also paid emigration fees, and thereby he was able by November 1935 to have helped 45 people flee Germany. After this he continued to help people, but the number is unknown. Many Jewish workers who had been fired due to religion came to work in his factory. The number of EMSA's employees grew from 54 in 1933 to 64 in 1936.

These various aid activities were financially supported by the company funds of the EMSA-Werke as well as by Herbert Samuel. Also, the increasingly difficult paperwork of the ILM was carried out by clerks in the EMSA-Werke. The company thus fell under increasing financial duress even though export profits were rising. Max Samuel reacted by running the EMSA-Werke on deteriorating machinery which he saw no point in replacing in view of the difficulties imposed by the Nazi government, and the factory building was also decaying.

On 30 and 31 August 1935, Max Samuel and ILM's syndic Richard Josephy visited many of Mecklenburg's Jewish congregations, especially all those recently dissolved or on the verge of dissolution, in order to collect all religious objects from defunct synagogues. Max Samuel concluded from these visits to the congregations that their financial situations, like that of the ILM, were terrible and continuously deteriorating. The anti-Semitic discriminations made the congregations' well-earning contributors lose their incomes and/or emigrate, while more destitute members increasingly needed aid. The congregations and their umbrella ILM were running out of money because dues had dropped to a third of their pre-1933 level. So in 1935 the Upper Council had to increase ILM's religious tax, a surplus on the regular state income tax progressing with rising income, by 10 to 20 percent (also progressing).

In 1935 Max Samuel's engagement in the ILM, including its paperwork and correspondence by his staff in the EMSA-Werke, aroused criticism in the upper council from the deputy Max Marcus (1876–1945), a lawyer from Güstrow, reproaching Max Samuel for acting without authorisation and in contradiction to the principle of collegiality in the upper council, thus entering disputes about his leadership. Richard Josephy pleaded with Marcus to cooperate with rather than confront Max Samuel.

Marcus ended the disputes after Max Samuel, Richard Siegmann, and Richard Josephy presented their plan for how to continue the ILM's activity under financial and personal stress under the ongoing Nazi discrimination and combined their suggestions with their joint offer to resign if the general assembly would not agree. This offer must have seemed to the members of ILM's general assembly to be a threat. Max Samuel further pleaded to the general assembly to vote for the ILM to apply for accession to the Prussian State(wide) Association of Jewish Congregations (German: Preußischer Landesverband jüdischer Gemeinden), hoping for monetary support from the bigger and financially stronger Prussian umbrella body.

In November 1935, the upper council under Max Samuel fulfilled a request from Rubensohn by sending Torah scrolls from the dissolved Teterow congregation to Pardes Hanna for a new congregation there. Later [1945 to 1950] Rubensohn (שלמה רובינזון, transliterated Shlomoh Rubinzon) became mayor of that town and a candidate for the 2nd Knesset running for the Progressives.

Also in November 1935 Käte travelled to Herbert and gave birth to her daughter Ruth in London, meaning she was born a British subject, the first Briton in the Samuel family. On 7 December 1935 the Rostock tax office sent Käte an order to provide collateral funds amounting to ℛℳ 29,500, presuming that she and her husband's emigration was pending, in order to secure for the tax office the flight tax on capital. They avoided this payment by returning to Rostock.

On 12 January 1936 at ILM's general assembly in Güstrow, Max Samuel, as head of the upper council, gave a farewell address to his friend and neighbour Richard Siegmann, who was resigning from membership and presidency of ILM's general assembly after, with effect of 31 December 1935, the Rostock tram company had dismissed him as its chief executive. On 6 April 1936 the ILM and the Prussian Landesverband agreed that the latter would contribute 20% to the ℛℳ 5,000 retirement grant of the chief rabbi's widow Helene Silberstein, née Weißbrem (1879–1952). In the same year Helene and daughter Edith Sarah Silberstein (1906–2000) emigrated to Palestine, where the other daughter lived.

Since by corporate law (Handelsgesetzbuch § 248 in its version of 1936) employees could not simultaneously be in the supervisory board of their employer company, on 30 September 1936 Kaiser left the board and was succeeded by the Rostock lawyer Paul Bernhard (1883–1974). The other members were Berta Samuel and the chairing Samson Kogel (1884–1967), Amsterdam, EMSA's central distributor abroad and a major creditor of the EMSA-Werke.

On behalf of the Upper Council Max Samuel, accompanied by Richard Josephy and – at times – the latter's son Albrecht, travelled overland, officially dissolving depopulated rural Jewish congregations such as those in Tessin bei Rostock on 2 May 1937 or later that year in Waren upon Müritz and collecting religious objects (such as Torah scrolls, menorot, etc.) and archival material and depositing them with Mecklenburg-Schwerin's State Main Archive in Schwerin. This is why these objects and archival matters are mostly preserved while so many Jews were murdered and their institutions destroyed by German anti-Semites and their helpers.

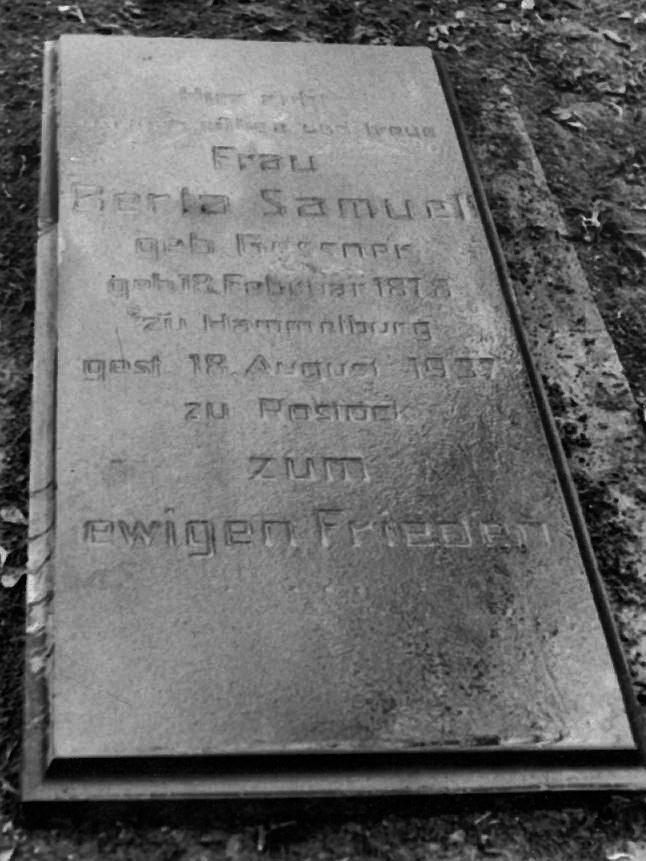
Grave of Berta Samuel, née Geßner (1878–1937), on Rostock's Old Jewish Cemetery, 2016

In 1937 the three Kaisers moved into the villa on Schillerplatz 10, Käte nursing her fatally ill mother. Seven months after her father had deceased, Berta died on 18 August 1937 from breast cancer, from which she had suffered since 1930 and which had been unsuccessfully treated among others in Marienbad. Herbert returned to Rostock for the last time to attend her funeral in Rostock's old Jewish cemetery, during which he was under Gestapo surveillance.

On 30 April 1937 Max Samuel sold his villa on Schillerplatz to his EMSA-Werke for ℛℳ 80,000 (double the then usual price for premises of this size in this location), thus effectively tapping money from his company for his free disposal without losing his home. However, he concealed this sale from the authorities by not registering it with the land registry, probably for good reasons, as the city of Rostock had had a right of preëmption on every piece of land in the Steintor-Vorstadt area around the train station since the time of its urban development.

In September 1937 Otto Heinrich Greve visited Herbert and Ilse Samuel in London, delivering important company documents. Also, Hermann Kaiser occasionally travelled abroad for the EMSA-Werke until at one point the German authorities tried to blackmail him by saying that they would deny the prolongation of his passport unless he would report about activities of other Germans travelling abroad and German exiles. He said he would think it over and left Germany immediately, staying in various countries as long as visitor's visas would allow him until Herbert obtained a British entry permit for him.

Scraping all the money together they had tenaciously saved in the previous four years, in 1938 Herbert and Ilse Samuel bought used machinery and moved their company to the Paterson Street Mill (now a scrapyard) between the homonymous street and the Leeds and Liverpool Canal, in Blackburn (Lancashire), renaming it as EMSA Works & Herbert Foot Appliance Ltd., extending from solely selling to also producing EMSA products. In early summer 1937 Max Samuel travelled to Amsterdam, where he also met his son Herbert who persuaded him not to return to Germany. Max Samuel then left Germany through Italy embarking in Genoa the Marnix van St. Aldegonde, debarking her in Southampton on 27 November 1937.

Käte concealed her father's and husband's emigration in order to prevent a pending flight tax on capital from becoming due by claiming that he would only visit, and that she and her daughter were still in Rostock. Käte didn't want to leave Rostock, as she was worried about the future of the many Jewish employees of the EMSA-Werke. She also helped the Lutheran Otto Heinrich Greve, hiring him on 1 September 1938 for the EMSA-Werke as a clerk after his dismissal as assessor from the public prosecution department (he had rejected to join the Nazi party) on 31 July, however, he had to leave by the end of September 1939, when the 'Arianisers' fired confidants of the actual Jewish owner and the Jewish employees.

On 5 September 1938 Käte took in her uncle Hermann Geßner, the medical doctor, and his wife Julie Stern (1875–1940), who had been given notice to vacate their flat in Nuremberg after Geßner had to shut down his medical practice following the Nazi government's revocation of approbations of Jewish physicians as of 5 August that year. Also in August 1938 the Nazi government banned Jews from working as manufacturers' representatives, till then a loophole in the anti-Semitic vocational bans much used by Jews barred from other earlier jobs, and within three months the EMSA-Werke effectively lost their distribution networks in Germany and abroad, dramatically reducing sales.

In mid September a Berlin notary informed the Rostock police that Käte's imminent emigration was likely, and simultaneously asked them not to issue a passport for her unless she would pay his bill for a service provided in June. However, she had not even applied for a passport. Thus the police were made aware of this and began processing a file on not issuing her passport before she even applied for it. According to Herbert, the family members in Wembley telegraphed her, explaining that her father was very ill and that they wanted her to see him. But Kate worried about the family, Jewish friends, and employees to be left behind, and so Max Samuel sent EMSA's Danish and Norwegian representatives to his daughter to help her understand the gravity of the situation. A few days later the notary sent a letter explaining that the bill had been paid so he would no longer object issuing her passport. So soon after when Käte applied for her passport she received it and left with her daughter Ruth, arriving in Britain on 30 September 1938.

On 18 September 1938, after his previous plenipotentiary and son-in-law Hermann Kaiser had left for Britain by May, Max Samuel commissioned his proxy agent Dr. Paul Hoffmann (1896–1969), one of the clerks employed in the EMSA-Werke after they had been fired as Jews in the mid-1930s, to liquidate the EMSA-Werke. Thus Hoffmann directed the EMSA-Werke and fulfilled the obligations of an executive, however, it remains unclear if he ever took action to liquidate since the anti-Semitic atrocities performed by the Nazi regime on 9 November 1938 (November Pogrom, aka Kristallnacht) accelerated the government-imposed dispossession of Jewish enterprises.

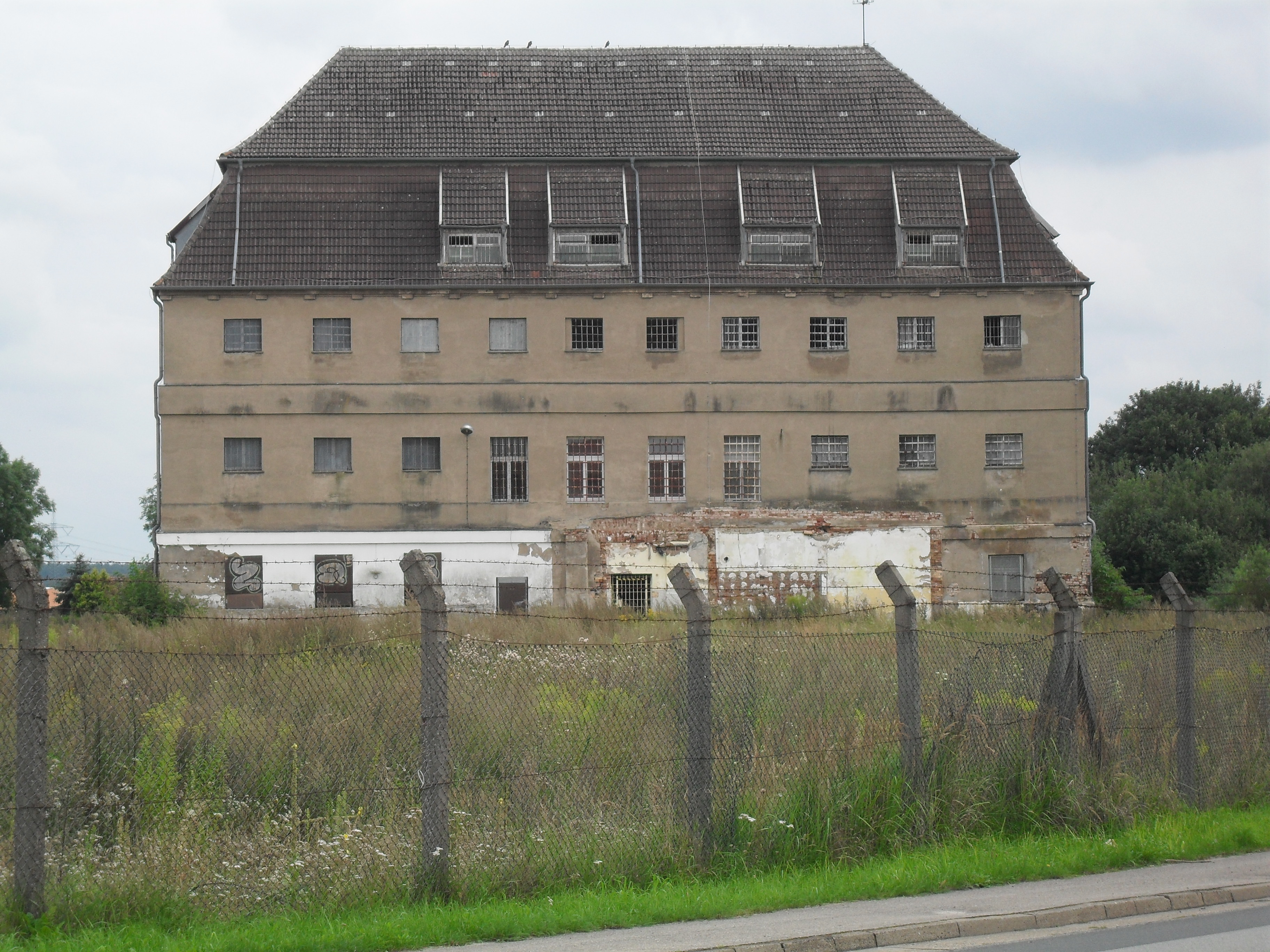
Then Landesanstalt prison where Hermann Geßner was detained, photo 2011

In the villa at Schillerplatz only Julie and Hermann Geßner, and the Lutheran cook Miss Lange, nicknamed Grössing, remained. They had to live through the atrocities of Kristallnacht, when Hermann Geßner was arrested like tens of thousands of other Jewish German men in that night and on 11 November at 1 o'clock in the night he was committed with others to the Landesanstalt prison in Neustrelitz. He was released from imprisonment on 19 November 1938. Max Samuel's villa was so vandalised that the Geßners could not stay. Rostock's renowned author Walter Kempowski (1929–2007), then attending the conservatory on Schillerplatz, recalled that music records (Herbert was a passionate collector of Jazz records) lay in the front garden and curtains flew in the wind through the broken windows of the villa.

The Geßners returned to Nuremberg, where they found refuge in the Jewish home for the elderly led by his future second wife Selma Stern (1893–1975) from Heinrichs, a locality of today's Suhl. On 11 February 1939 the Samuels in Britain obtained British residence permits for Hermann and Julie Geßner, but these were restricted to six months only. According to the purchase contract of 3 May 1939 for the sequestered villa on Schillerplatz 10 it was then still uninhabited and had not yet been cleared of the Samuels' furniture and household items. Max Samuel's EMSA-Werke were subsequently seized in 1939 and 'Aryanised'. Meanwhile, Herbert travelled to Scandinavia and gained faithful EMSA clients to redirect their orders to Blackburn.

=== Last years in Britain ===
Among the Samuel family the three Kaisers were the first to find a new home in Britain, a house near Corporation Park, Blackburn, taking in Ilse Samuel and in the course of 1939 Hermann Kaiser's parents Simon Kaiser (1876–1950) and Fanny Wertheim (1875–1948) from Mardorf in Hesse, their other son Hugo, daughter-in-law Dinah and the latters' twin sons, while Herbert first stayed in London preparing the move of the company office. Max Samuel first lived in a hotel in Blackburn until in 1939 he found a house on 2, Azalea Road to move in with Julie and Hermann Geßner, having arrived in Britain after a two day journey on 30 June 1939, first staying with the Kaisers. By the time of the British 1939 National Registration also Hoffmann lived with Max Samuel.

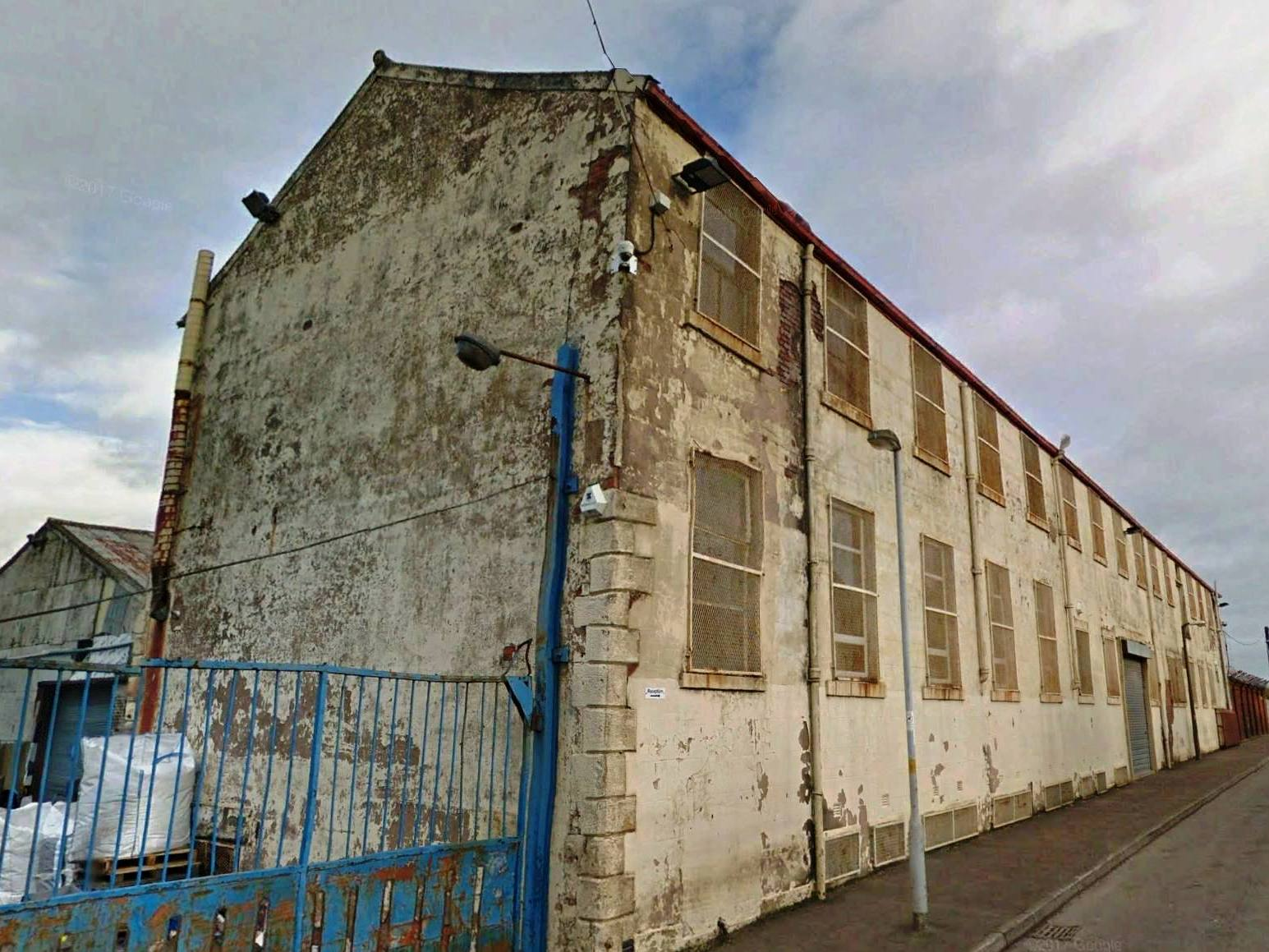
Blackburn: Cotton Mill on Paterson Street, EMSA was on the ground floor, by 2012

Kate, her husband, and their daughter left in January 1940 for Tulsa, Oklahoma, receiving Affidavits of Support and Sponsorship by the Kaisers' relatives there. Soon after, the German and Soviet invasion of Poland had been followed by the German occupation of much of western and central Europe and the Soviet occupation of much of eastern Europe. The British government, alone in its military resistance to Nazi Germany, ordered the internment of enemy aliens. Hugo Kaiser was interned and only released shortly before emigrating with his wife to Tulsa in May 1940, while Herbert Samuel was spared from internment on the grounds of his task as business manager and Max Samuel due to his bad heart condition.

On 16 May 1940 a fire broke out in the rooms of Lancashire Manufacturers Ltd. on the floor above the EMSA-works in the Paterson Street Mill premises, with Herbert and Max Samuel racing to help, fighting damages by leaking quench water with machinery and stocks of the EMSA-Works, while Hermann Geßner attended his dying wife at the Herbert's and Ilse's, then on Barker Lane.

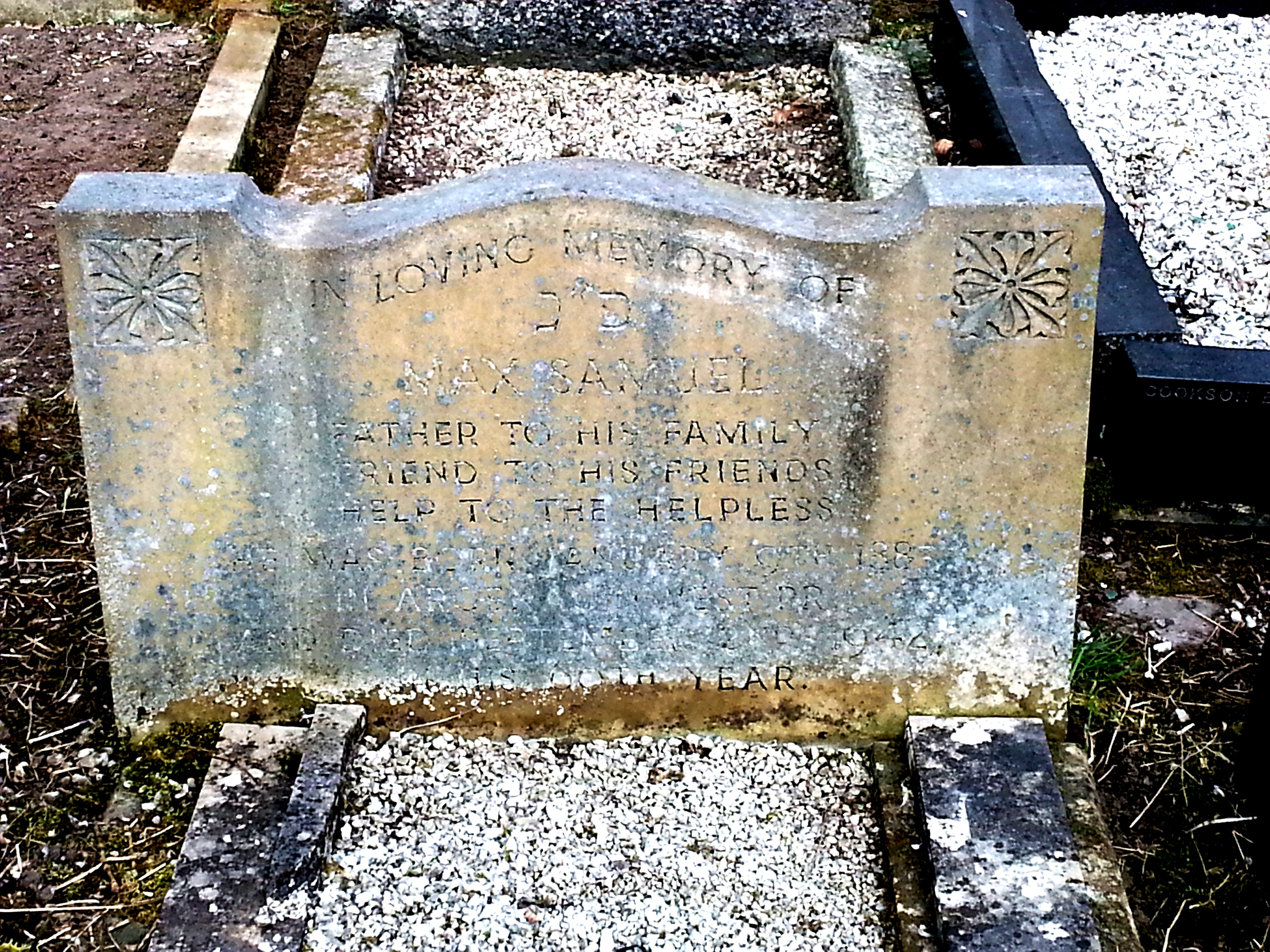
Max Samuel's grave in the Blackburn Old Cemetery, Jewish Section, Whalley New Road, 2019

In his last years in Britain Max Samuel became very gloomy, melancholic, and pessimistic. Denaturalised, like about 250,000 other Jewish Germans, by a German decree issued on 25 November 1941, Max Samuel remained stateless until his death. Not long before his death he received the information about the birth of his grandson George Kaiser. Max Samuel died in Blackburn at the age of 59. He was buried in the Jewish section of the Blackburn Old Cemetery, now, simply Blackburn Cemetery. The Friends of Blackburn Old Cemetery take care of his grave and those of his relatives (brother-in-law Geßner and the latter's two wives) buried in the same cemetery.

== Family ==
His parents Jacob Itzig and Rosalie (Rosa), née Schrubski from Inowrazlaw, were pious Jews and very poor. His father was a pedlar of everyday items who travelled between villages with a horse-drawn cart. Eventually the children had to leave, which is why Max Samuel's school education stopped when he was 14 years old. Max Samuel had five brothers and one sister, and their surname at birth was Itzig, but the family changed their name to Samuel when he was five years old.

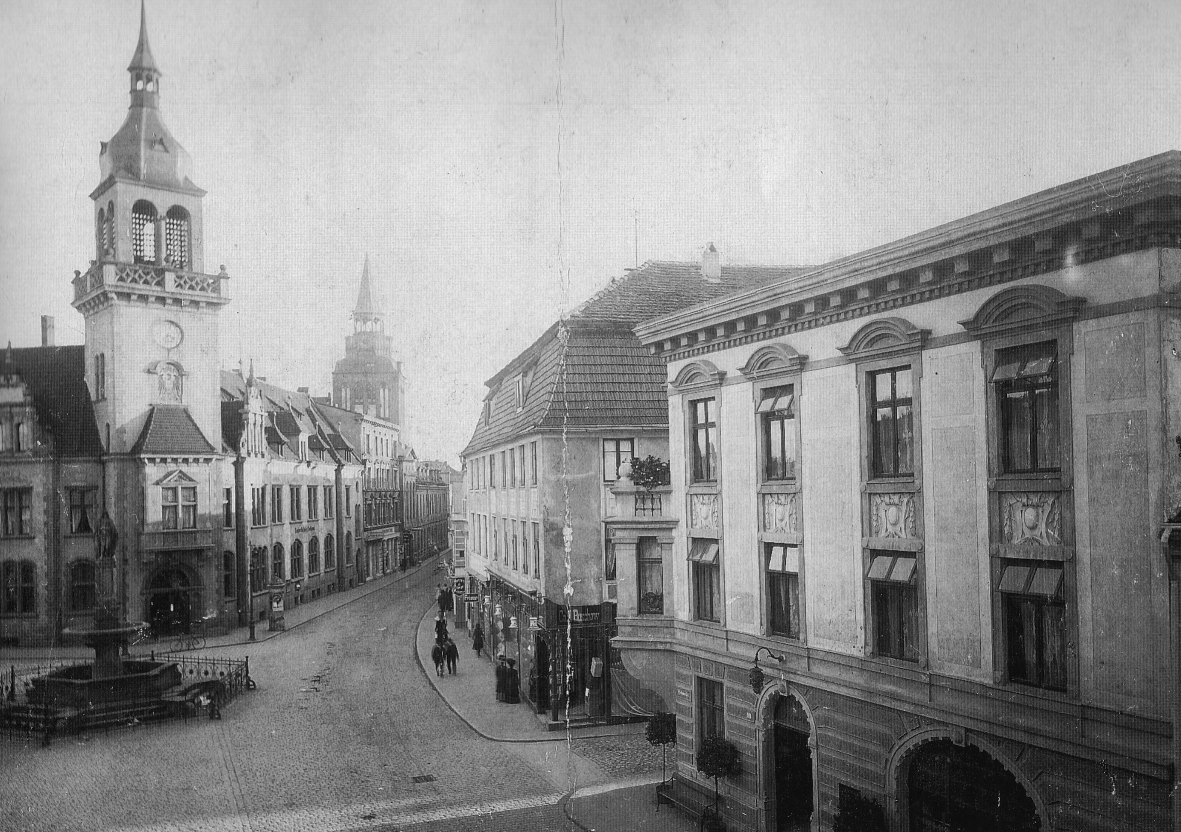
Güstrow: Schuhwaaren J. Samuel on Pferdemarkt 57 on the right of the Post Office with corner tower, by 1900

After giving control of the shoe business to Max Samuel in 1906, Isidor 'James' Samuel (1871–1933) kept his 1905-founded rubber factory in Güstrow, which supplied rubber parts for the EMSA-Werke, and operated it until his death from diabetes. James Samuel was active as the treasurer in Güstrow's Jewish congregation (German: Israelitische Gemeinde Güstrow) and worked with his partner Paul Eggert, who took control of the factory after James' death. In 1938 Max Samuel's sister Frieda (1886–1965) emigrated to Chile with her Dutch husband John Joseph Meibergen (1875–1958) and his sister Karoline (1877–1953), who was James Samuel's widow.

Two of Max Samuel's brothers were murdered in the Shoah: the tailor Gustav Samuel (1881–1943, Bełżec Camp) was deported on 12 February 1940 from Stettin to Bełżyce Ghetto and on 15 August 1941 onwards to Bełżec Camp, and the watchmaker Julius Samuel (1878–1943, Sobibór Camp) with wife Gertrude, née Gellhorn (1878–1943, Sobibór Camp), and son Kurt (1905–1942, Auschwitz), all the three and the surviving elder son Heinz Samuel (1904–1993) having moved to Delmenhorst in 1920, when their home place Argenau had been seized by Poland, and the former three escaped from Delmenhorst to the Netherlands, where they were deported from Westerbork in 1943, whereas Heinz Samuel survived in Britain. Max and his siblings' brother Feo(dor) Samuel survived in the French Foreign Legion and lived as a pensioner in Strasbourg in Alsace. His daughter Carla Claudie survived hidden in a French nunnery. The brother Wilhelm 'William' Samuel (1876–1948), who had lived with his first wife Paula Dreyfus (1880–1926), their three sons, and his widowed mother Rosalie (1849–1934) in Cologne, later escaped with his sons to New York, where he remarried in 1946.

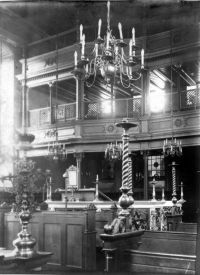
Halberstadt Synagogue interior, about 1930

Before his marriage Max Samuel lived with his elder brother James and his wife Karoline Meibergen in their flat right above the shoe shop on Pferdemarkt 57 in Güstrow. On 14 August 1906 Max Samuel and Berta Geßner (1878–1937) married in Halberstadt, whose Jewish community (German: Synagogengemeinde zu Halberstadt) formed a centre of Modern Orthodoxy, where at times her father Jakob Geßner (1848–1937) had served as the hazzan. Jakob Geßner was a Bavarian teacher, long serving in Hammelburg, where Max Samuel, travelling as a salesman, got to know Berta. While living in Güstrow the members of the Jewish congregation there elected Jakob Geßner their vice chair. Berta's and Max Samuel's son Herbert (1907–1992) and daughter Käte (1910–1987, later altered to Kate) were born in Güstrow. In Rostock on 17 March 1930 Käte married Hermann Georg Kaiser (1904–1992, later altered to Herman Geo. Kaiser) from Mardorf in Hesse. One of Käte's grandchildren is Tim Blake Nelson.

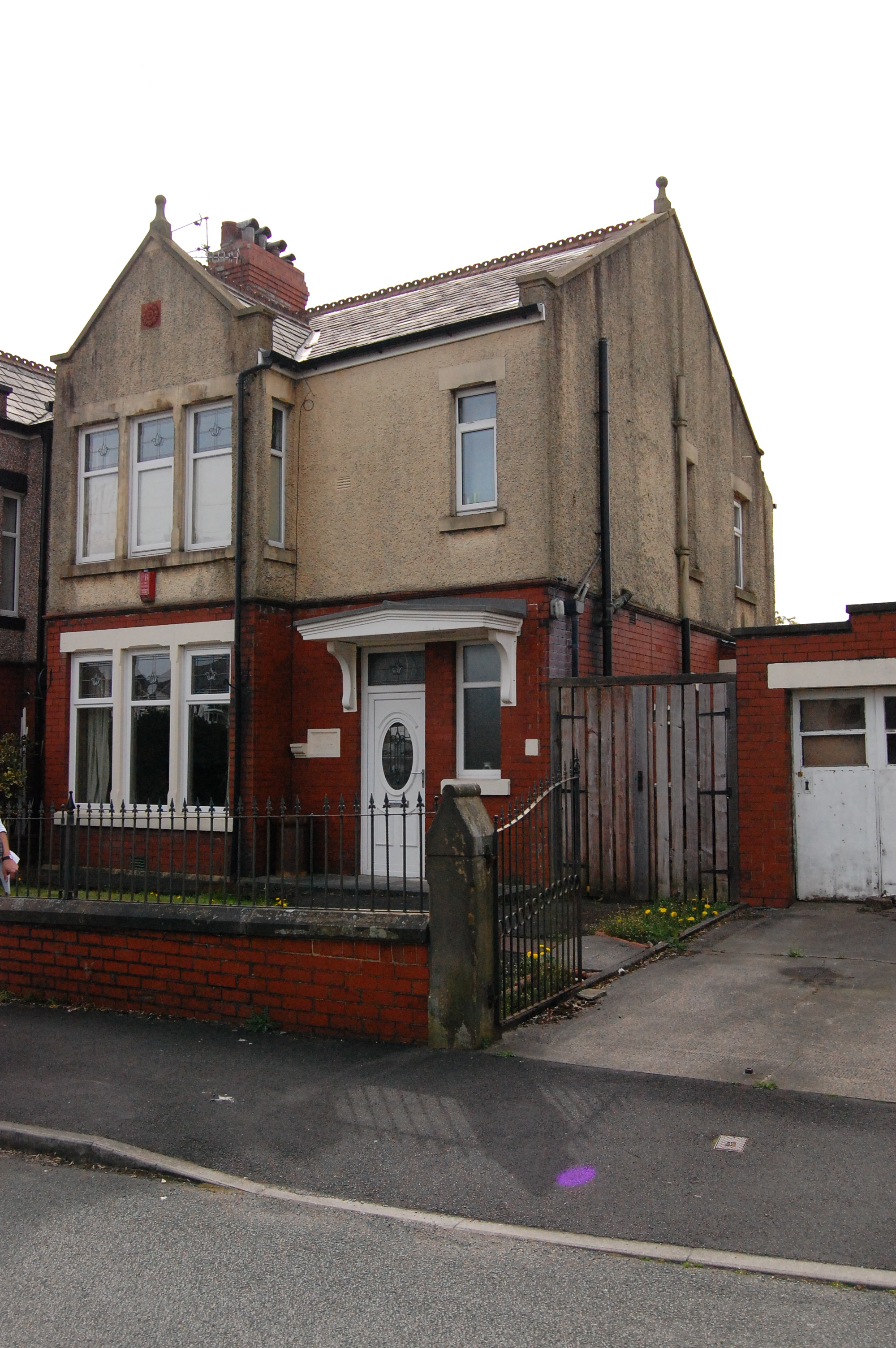
Lower Darwen: 73, Higher Croft Road, from 1943 to 1992 Herbert and Ilse Samuel's home, 2019

On 5 December 1936 Herbert Samuel married Ilse Steinfeld, whom he had known for two years. Between Christmas 1936 and New Year 1937 they then visited family in Rostock and Berlin, where their families bought them real furniture with paper reichsmarks and exported it to furnish their recently found two-room flat in 139, Empire Court, Wembley. Both working, they saved every penny to establish themselves and help friends escaping Germany. From their first Blackburn home on Barker Lane they moved in 1943 with the Geßners to their last home on 73, Higher Croft Road in Lower Darwen.

They were naturalised as British subjects only in 1946, thus between 1941 and the end of the war they were stateless. During the war Herbert and Ilse housed many refugees, three to seven at a time, and gave them funds and employment. Although they suffered many difficulties, including Security Service (MI5) surveillance (1932 to 1951) due to Ilse's acquaintance to Germans who, once in British refuge, sided with the Soviet Union, Hitler's war ally in subjecting eastern Europe, they were glad to have escaped the Nazis. Between 1959 and 1963 Ilse studied at Manchester's university Germanistics, philosophy and Russian, receiving a BA in 1962, adding comparative literature without MA in the end, then working as a teacher at Darwen Grammar School (1963 to 1973).

== Expropriation of the Samuels in Germany ==
After the emigration of the Samuel family became obvious to the authorities, the tax office issued a flight tax demand amounting to ℛℳ 200,000, based on the ℛℳ 900,000 company value of the EMSA-Werke as estimated by the tax office in 1932. On 3 January 1939 the Mecklenburg State Administration took the EMSA-Werke under custody, appointing auditor Karl Deutler as custodian commissioned to sell them in order to recover the tax demand.

On 21 January Deutler 'Aryanised' the EMSA-Werke AG stock company (German: Aktiengesellschaft, AG) by selling it to the EMSA-Werke KG, a limited partnership (German: Kommanditgesellschaft, KG) the foundation of which had officially only been concluded on 17 April 1939. Its new owners were two Rostock investors, department store owner Erich Voß and bank director Harry Helmers, who paid only ℛℳ 146,000 for the EMSA-Werke. The 'Arianisers' of EMSA shamelessly sent the tax bills to England, hoping Max Samuel would pay them.

Voß and Helmers appointed Otto Schröder and manager Wilhelm Eder, a foreman of Max Samuel who was to meet Herbert in London in 1939, but never appeared, as executives with procuration. The Jewish employees were fired within the following months. On 10 July 1939 Voß and Helmers gave Eder a 10% share in the EMSA-Werke, only effective as of 9 January 1940, as confidants of Jewish businessmen were excluded from 'Aryanisations' probably due to suspicion that they would conceal a continued proprietorship of the previous Jewish owner.

Due to supply shortages during the war, production declined after 1939, and exports continued only to Sweden and Switzerland. Production was concentrated on orthopedics. In 1941 the EMSA-Werke were renamed Voß-Werke KG, however the usage of the trademark EMSA was continued.

Deutler also found an 'Aryaniser' for the villa, and on 3 May 1939 he signed a contract with the newly founded Kaiser-Wilhelm-Institut für Tierzuchtforschung Rostock-Dummerstorf (institute of the Kaiser-Wilhelm-Gesellschaft for research in animal breeding), represented by its administrator Julius Ost, paying ℛℳ 70,000. The contract would only become effective once the city waived its right of preëmption and once various Nazi authorities would confirm it, such as the authority rationing convertible foreign exchange (German: Devisenstelle) and the price control office (German: Preisbehörde), established in 1935, dictating prices in order to repress the surging inflation caused by the Nazis' steady money printing. The Rostock tax office was to be paid its tax demand against the EMSA-Werke, which since June 1933 was partially secured by a mortgage of ℛℳ 50,000 on Max Samuel's private premises on Schillerplatz 10.

However, Deutler did not know that the villa was legally not under his custodianship, since its sale to the EMSA-Werke had not been registered in the land registry, so it still documented Max Samuel personally as the proprietor. Once aware of this Deutler achieved his official appointment as custodian of the villa with effect of 24 July in order to fulfill the requirements of the purchase contract of 3 May. On 5 September 1939 the Mecklenburg state government approved the sale of Schillerplatz 10. After the tax office had confirmed its demand was fulfilled, its mortgage on the villa was cancelled on 22 April 1940 and the land registrar registered the Reich's Ministry for Nutrition and Agriculture, the legal representative of the institute for animal breeding, as proprietor of Schillerplatz 10.

In 1945 Rostock became part of the Soviet occupation zone in Germany. The Soviet-appointed new pro-communist administration expropriated the absent Voß, who had fled Rostock before the Soviet invasion on 1 May 1945, and Helmers, who then followed Voß to the British zone. The business' name was changed to Rostocker Schuhfabrik (Rostock shoe factory). The minority holder Eder successfully reclaimed his share. After the foundation of the East German Democratic Republic (1949; GDR) he was expropriated too in 1951.

The Mecklenburg government then made the shoe factory a part of the combine called Vereinigung volkseigener Betriebe Textil-Bekleidung-Leder des Landes Mecklenburg (union of publicly owned companies for textiles, clothing, and leather of the state of Mecklenburg), which was combined with other businesses in 1957 to make the even bigger combine Rostocker Elektro-Gerätebau (Rostock electric equipment manufacturing), which later was changed again into the Deutsche Handelszentrale für Pharmazie- und Krankenhausbedarf (German trade centre for pharmaceutical und hospital supplies). Presumably through all these name changes the same or similar orthopedic products continued to be produced. This combine withdrew from its location in the Friedrichstraße 28 and on 25 March 1966 the city of Rostock reallocated the premises to its VEB Stadtbeleuchtung Rostock (Rostock street lighting).

In July 1945 the institute for animal breeding was ordered to evacuate the villa and the Rostock local branch of the Cultural Federation for Germany's democratic renewal moved in with the cultural office of the city and tenants in the attic flat. In 1955 Ilse-Dore Eckardt, a child nurse then in charge of furnishing and installations of daycares, converted the villa for its usage into Kinderkrippe Schillerplatz, as more and more mothers were employed in the communist production system. However, the Schillerplatz 10 premises remained state property, and Rostock's public daycare department (German: Krippen und Heime der Stadt Rostock) was not the proprietor.

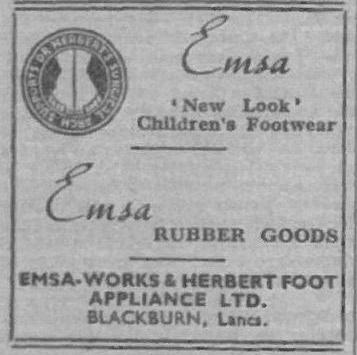
Advertising for EMSA products, 1951

== Legacy and restitution ==
Starting 1952 Herbert Samuel, judicially supported by his friend Magnus, as Otto Heinrich Greve was nicknamed, successfully requested recompense from West Germany for foregoing the use of the EMSA-Werke and the villa in Rostock, East Germany. In 1960 Herbert sold the EMSA Works & Herbert Foot Appliance to an international rubber company. and, as his 1929 German law degree was not accepted in the United Kingdom, worked as freelance consultant agent.

In 1982, after lengthily searching, the West German August-Wilhelm Bründel, son of Paul Bründel, found Herbert Samuel in Lower Darwen in order to learn about the fate of the Samuels after they had left Rostock. As a collector of information of historical interest on Rostock, then behind the Iron Curtain, Bründel shared copies of articles about the Samuels authored by Frank Schröder (1958–2014) with his fellow ex-Rostocker Herbert Samuel in December 1986. Also, Ilse[marie] Sawitz (1912–2006), niece of Willi Sawitz, in Manchester, shared the articles of Schröder, then city archivist of Rostock, with the Samuels. So Herbert Samuel came into contact with a group of activists in Rostock trying to reconstruct the events of the Nazi period beyond the doctrines of the communists, who unilaterally valorised their comrades as antifascist fighters.

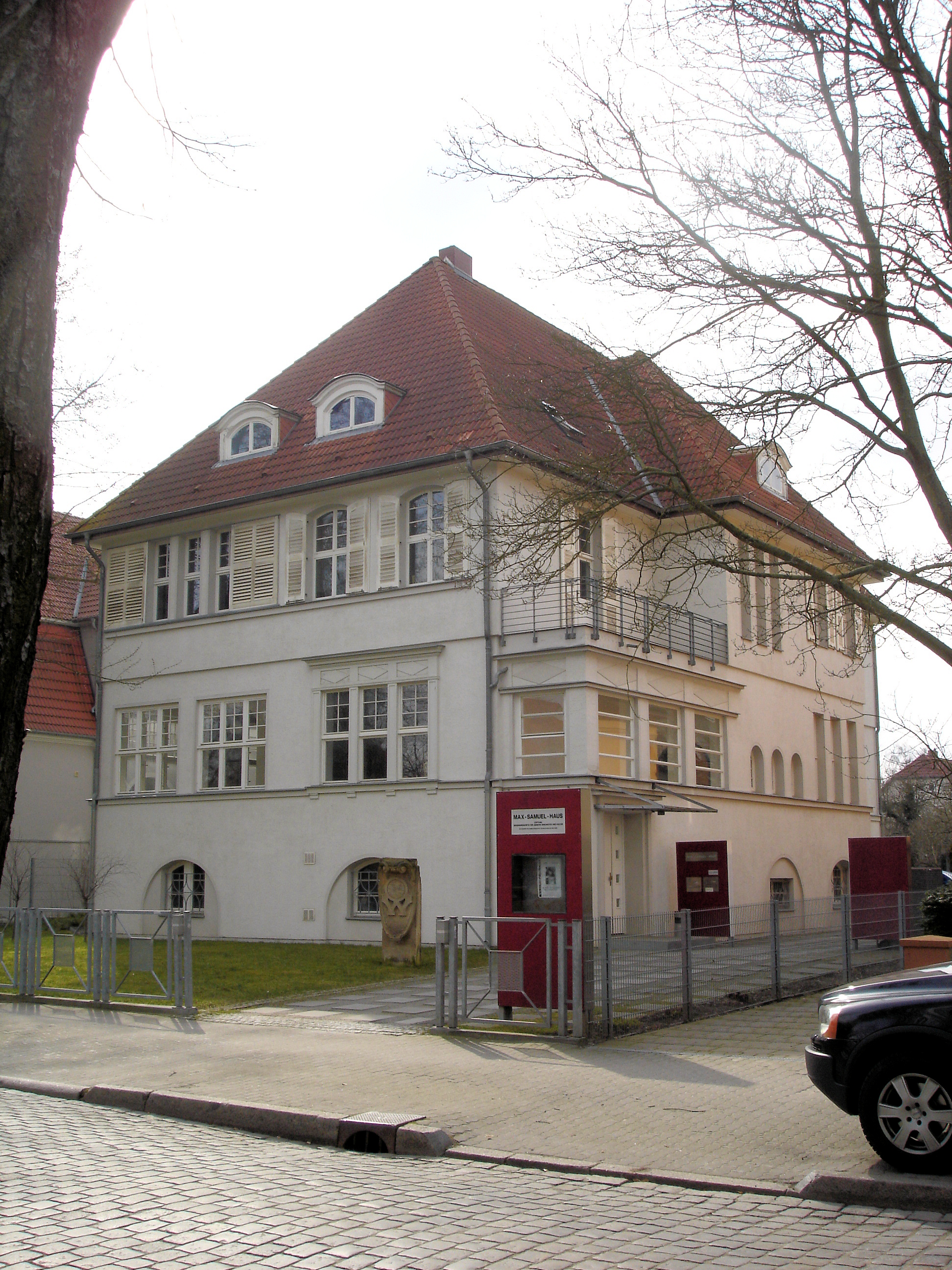
Villa at Schillerplatz 10, now called Max-Samuel-Haus, 2009

The villa at Schillerplatz in Rostock was reacquired by Herbert Samuel via a restitution request, with – confronted with that claim – the Rostock street lighting offering him recompense in order to remain in the premises, which was only possible after the end of the communist dictatorship in East Germany in 1989, as this allowed Schröder and his fellow activists to found an association for the research and presentation of Jewish history and culture in Rostock and then formalise their effort in June 1990.

Herbert Samuel and Schröder developed the idea of the Schillerplatz 10 villa becoming a home for this association after February 1991. Then the Samuels envoyed Greve's eldest daughter Julia Asher-Greve to research on the Samuels' former homes and enterprises in Güstrow and Rostock. In mid-July 1991, the foundation was able to move into a first room in the villa's attic flat.

=== Max-Samuel-Haus in Rostock ===
By his signature on 22 August 1991, shortly before his death, Herbert Samuel donated the villa to the Stiftung Begegnungsstätte für jüdische Geschichte und Kultur in Rostock (literally: Foundation of the Meeting Place for Jewish History and Culture in Rostock), as the foundation is officially termed. Herbert Samuel decided to donate the villa in an effort towards reconciliation between Jews and others, as he explained to the attending Schröder and Prof. Dieter Neßelmann, Senator of finances of Rostock city between 1990 and 1997. In October 1991 Herbert Samuel informed the staff of the Max-Samuel-Haus that his brother-in-law Herman Geo. Kaiser fully supported Herbert's idea to donate the villa to the foundation.

On 2 September 1991, the 49th anniversary of Max Samuel's death, the foundation's board held its opening session. The daycare moved out and on 2 October 1991 the villa, named Max-Samuel-Haus since, was dedicated to its new purpose as the Rostock Jewish Heritage Centre, a meeting place, cultural venue and research institute, run by the foundation. In the beginning the foundation was also seen as a counter project to the Lichtenhagen riots of 1992 in Rostock.

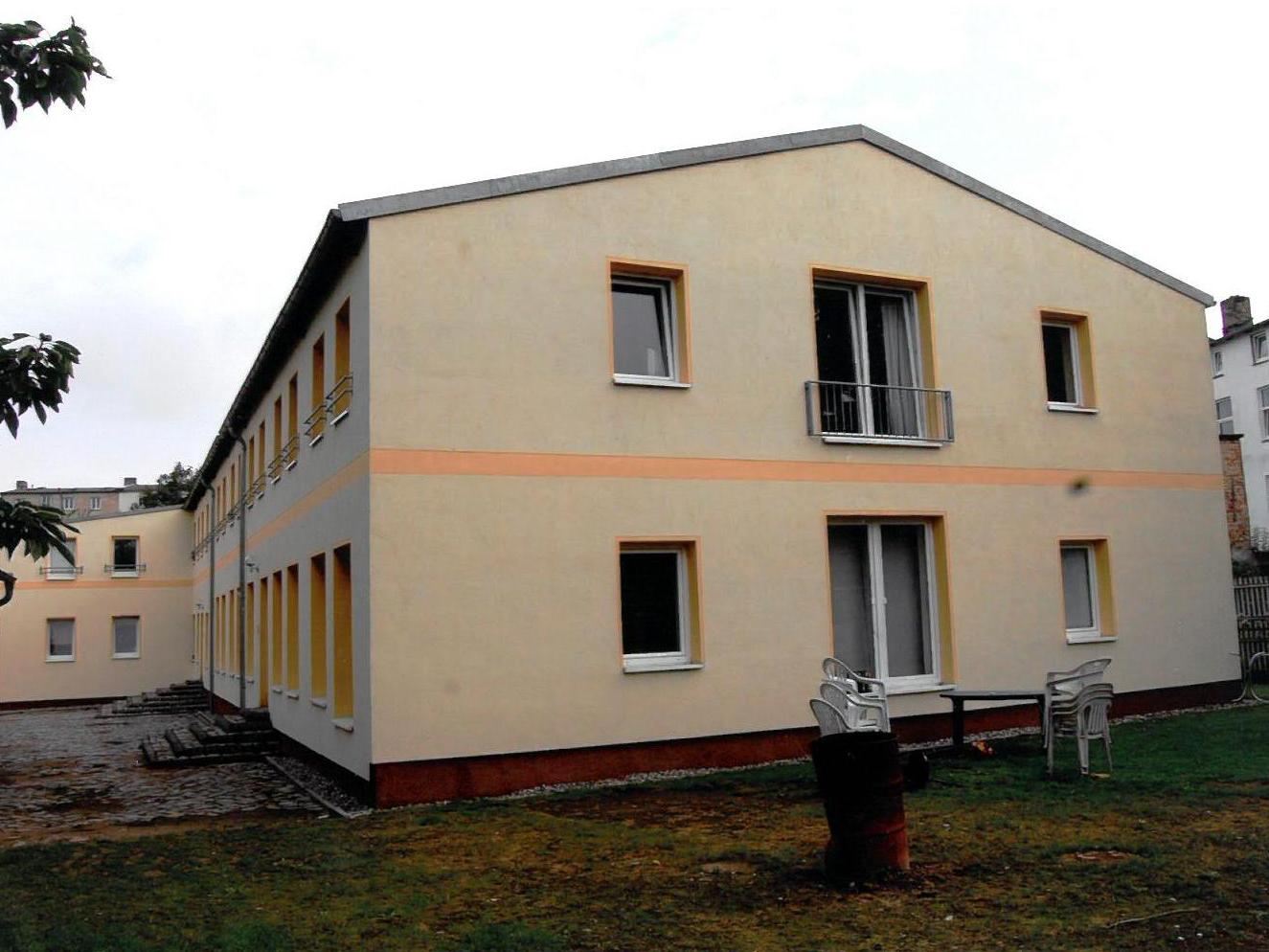
Premises on Friedrichstraße 28, 2011

On 7 July 1991 Herbert Samuel was compensated for the loss of the former EMSA-Werke at Friedrichstraße 28 with DM 200,000. The book collection of Herbert and his wife Ilse, née Steinfeld (1911–1992), including books of his parents from Rostock (and of hers), was donated to the Max-Samuel-Haus after her death through Elsie Peel. The first Samuel family members visiting the villa since its reopening as Max-Samuel-Haus were Ruth Kaiser Nelson and her niece Emily Kaiser in mid-August 1993.

In memory and honour of Max Samuel and his works, the foundation arranged four events in the Max-Samuel-Haus, first in 1991 on the occasion of naming of the villa after him, second from 17 February to 17 March 2006 (the exhibition: Max Samuel: Unternehmer – Gemeindevorsitzender – Flüchtling), third from 2 September 2010 to 6 February 2011 (the exhibition: Die Familie Samuel: Ein jüdischer Unternehmer in Rostock), and fourth from 20 September to 20 October 2016 (presentation of the rediscovered 1920 portrait of Max Samuel by Egon Tschirch). This was supplemented on the evening of the vernissage by an eyewitness interview with Ruth Kaiser Nelson, Max Samuel's granddaughter.
