= Otto Heinrich Greve =

German politician (1908–1968)

Member of the Bundestag; for Nienburg – Schaumburg-Lippe
- In office 7 September 1949 – 17 October 1961
- Preceded by: Constituency established
- Succeeded by: Gustav Heinemann

Member of the Landtag of Lower Saxony
- In office May 1947 – June 1951
- Constituency: State list

Personal details
- Born: Otto Heinrich Luis Paul Magnus Georg Greve; 30 January 1908 Rostock, Germany
- Died: 11 June 1968 (aged 60) Ascona, Switzerland
- Party: Social Democratic (after 1948)
- Other political affiliations: DDP (1926–1933); FDP (1945–1948)
- Education: LMU Munich; Nancy-Université; University of Paris; University of Rostock

Otto Heinrich Greve (30 January 1908 – 11 June 1968) was a German lawyer by profession and a politician of the German Democratic Party (DDP) and its successor German State Party (DStP; 1926 to 1933, when the Nazis banned that party), the Free Democratic Party (FDP; 1945 to 1947) and Social Democratic Party of Germany (SPD; since 1948) and a member of the German Bundestag.

== Early life and education ==
Greve, born the only child to Rostock's politically active liberal chief postmaster Heinrich Greve (1868–1936), grew up in the liberal merchant circles of Rostock and developed a childhood friendship with Herbert Samuel (1907–1992), son of Max Samuel, a close friend of Greve's father Heinrich Greve. After finishing Rostock's Große Stadtschule grammar school he studied law at the Ludwig-Maximilians-Universität München, Nancy-Université, the University of Paris, and the University of Rostock.

In 1926, Otto Heinrich Greve joined the German Democratic Party and was elected a member of the German central board of the Young Democrats (DDP's youth wing) and speaker of Rostock's General Students Committee. He was also active in the Reichsbanner Schwarz-Rot-Gold, a cross-party alliance of activists for developing and defending democracy. All this ended with the Nazis' government take-over when they banned democratic parties, their youth wings and other civil society activities.

== Legal career ==
As a graduate of law, Greve joined the Mecklenburg state prosecution department, while his friend and fellow law-graduate Herbert Samuel was denied to practise at all as a lawyer because the new Nazi government banned him as a Jew from doing so. So Samuel prepared for emigration and left to Britain in 1934. The Nazis as dictators newly having access to every governmental authority suspiciously eyed Greve because he had exposed himself as a democrat before 1933.

Greve graduated with a doctorate in law on an unpolitical subject, published by him in 1936. In September 1937 Greve visited Samuel in London, delivering important company documents of Max Samuel's EMSA Werke company on the verge of relocating its production from Germany to Britain.

On 31 July 1938, Greve was dismissed as assessor from the public prosecution department after he had rejected the call of superiors to join the Nazi party. His friends helped him find a job, so on 1 September 1938 the EMSA-Werke company hired him as a clerk, but he had to leave again by the end of September 1939, after 'Aryanisers' had taken over the company.

Greve then found a job as a general counsel with an industrial company in Middle Germany and married Helene Greve from Greiz. He left his work close before the German defeat to live with his parents-in-law. By the end of the Second World War the liberating US occupiers appointed Greve the first post-Nazi era county commissioner (Landrat) of the Greiz District in Thuringia, however, when in July 1945 the area was handed over to the Soviet occupation zone in Germany the new Soviet occupiers dismissed him as county commissioner and he, his wife and their three daughters, took refuge in Wagenfeld, meanwhile in the British occupation zone in Germany. Living in Wagenfeld he received the legal mandate of his exiled co-sister-in-law, member of the displaced Heilbrunn family of textile industrialists, to reclaim their assets there from the Aryanisers in which he succeeded already in 1945 – with ranks of German authorities still interspersed with more or less identifiable supporters and former members of the Nazi party.

He soon moved to Hanover, then capital of the new Lower Saxony, and opened a law office and stood up again as a democrat in Germany becoming a founding member of the DDP's successor party, the Free Democratic Party (FDP), and being elected into its British zonal party executive board. However, he quit the FDP by the end of 1947 when he remained without sufficient support among his fellow board members to take action against too lax a practice in admitting former Nazis as new party members. In 1948 he joined the Social Democratic Party of Germany (SPD).

== Political career ==
Greve was a member of the state parliament of Lower Saxony from 1947 to 1951. He later, as a lawyer and Lower Saxon delegate to the Parliamentary Council, the West German constituent assembly, was thus one of the "parents of the Basic Law" who co-authored that West German constitution. He was then elected a member of the German Bundestag from the first post-World War Two general elections in 1949 to 1961. He was always directly elected in the then constituency of Nienburg – Schaumburg-Lippe.

Greve was strongly advocating West German Wiedergutmachung in parliamentary legislation and practice as a lawyer. He also helped many clients getting recompense by way of West Germany's Lastenausgleich for assets expropriated and/or withheld in German territory under communist rule (the Soviet sector of Berlin, the Soviet zone in Middle Germany and the Polish- and Soviet-annexed Eastern Germany) for undeniable foregoing the use of those assets, else – as maintained by the West German legal situation – to be restituted once communism would be over.

== Literature ==
- Herbst, Ludolf; Jahn, Bruno (2002). Vierhaus, Rudolf (ed.). Biographisches Handbuch der Mitglieder des Deutschen Bundestages. 1949–2002 [Biographical Handbook of the Members of the German Bundestag. 1949–2002] (in German). München: De Gruyter - De Gruyter Saur. p. 1715. ISBN 978-3-11-184511-1.
- Heiko Holste, „Im Profil: Wider den Geist der Rosenburg – Vor 50 Jahren starb der Rechtsanwalt und Rechtspolitiker Otto Heinrich Greve“, in: Neue Juristische Wochenschrift, Beilage 'NJW-aktuell', No. 51 (2017), pp. 18seq.
- Heiko Holste, „Jurist im Porträt: Otto Heinrich Greve (1908–1968): Anwalt für die Wiedergutmachung und gegen die Renazifizierung der Nachkriegsjustiz“, in: Recht und Politik, No. 2 (vol. 54, 2018), pp. 220–231.
