= Egon Tschirch =

German painter

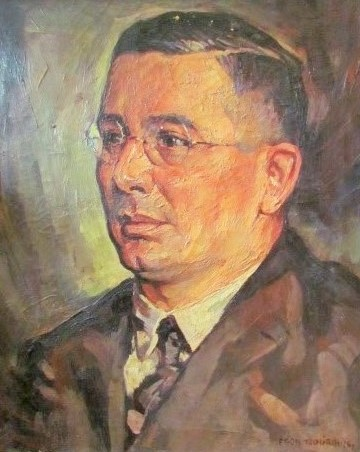
- Self-portrait (1926)
- Born: 22 January 1889; Rostock, German Empire
- Died: 5 February 1948 (aged 58); Rostock, Soviet occupation zone
- Education: Academy of Arts Berlin

Egon Tschirch (Rostock, 22 June 1889–5 February 1948) was a German painter and illustrator. In the 1920s, he was regarded as one of the most important artists of Mecklenburg. After the 1930s, Tschirch was viewed with skepticism due to his affiliation with National Socialism and being a member of the Nazi Party. In 2015, the rediscovery of a major work of his, his Song of Songs picture cycle, initiated discussion and re-evaluation of the artist and his work.

== Early years in the German Empire ==
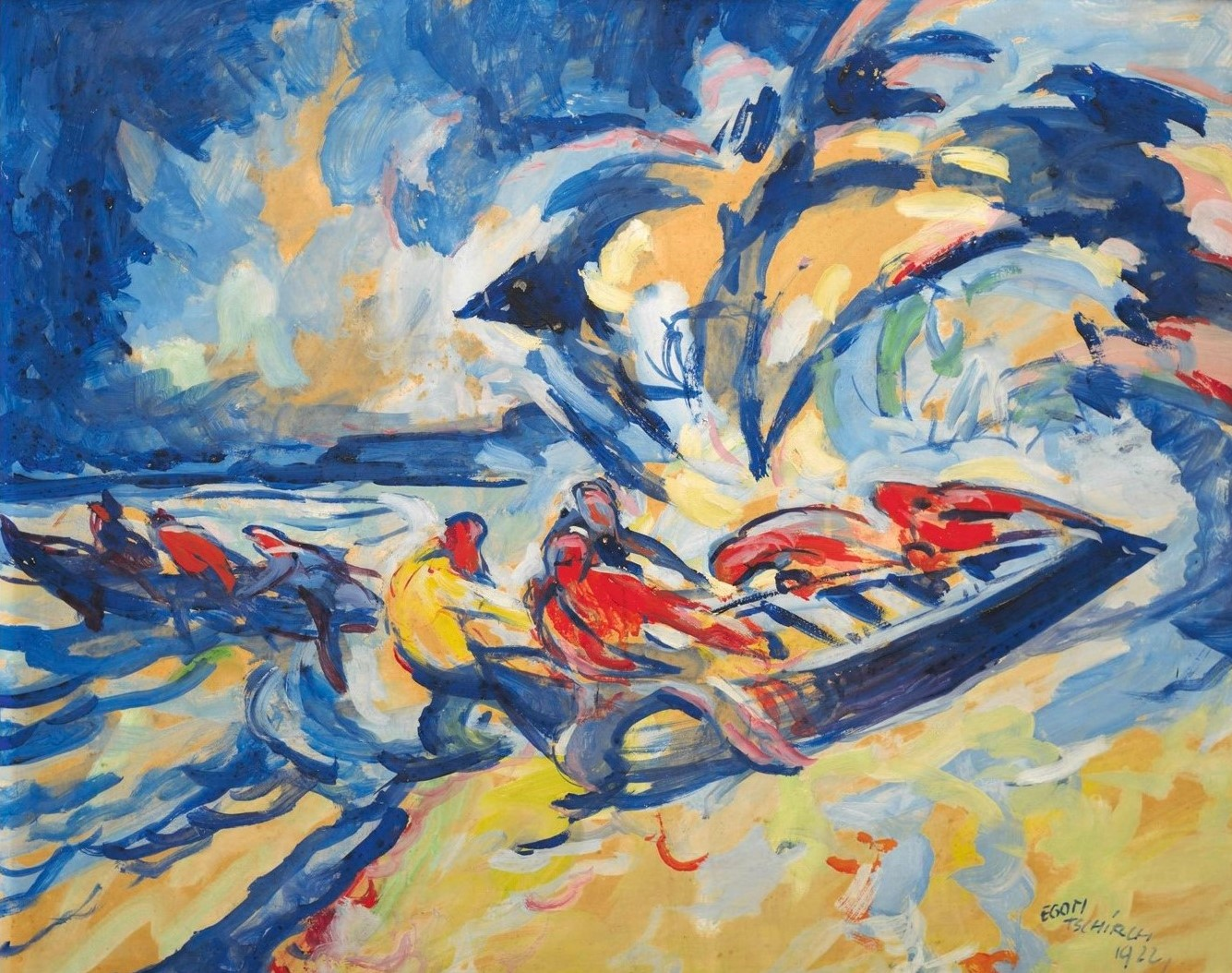
Boote mit Fischern, Boats with Fishermen (1922)

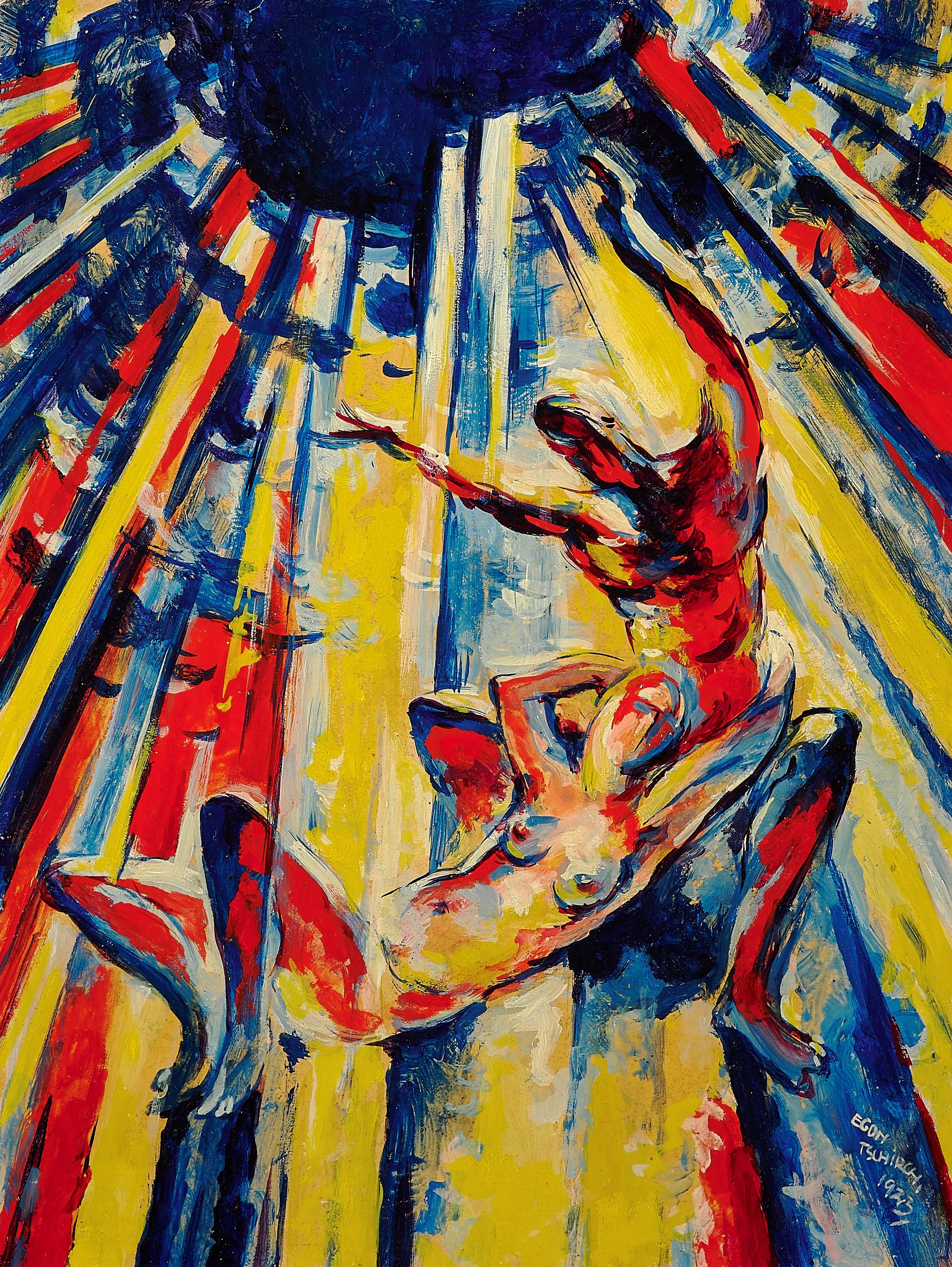
Das Hohelied Salomos, Song of Songs, No. 11 (picture cycle 1923)

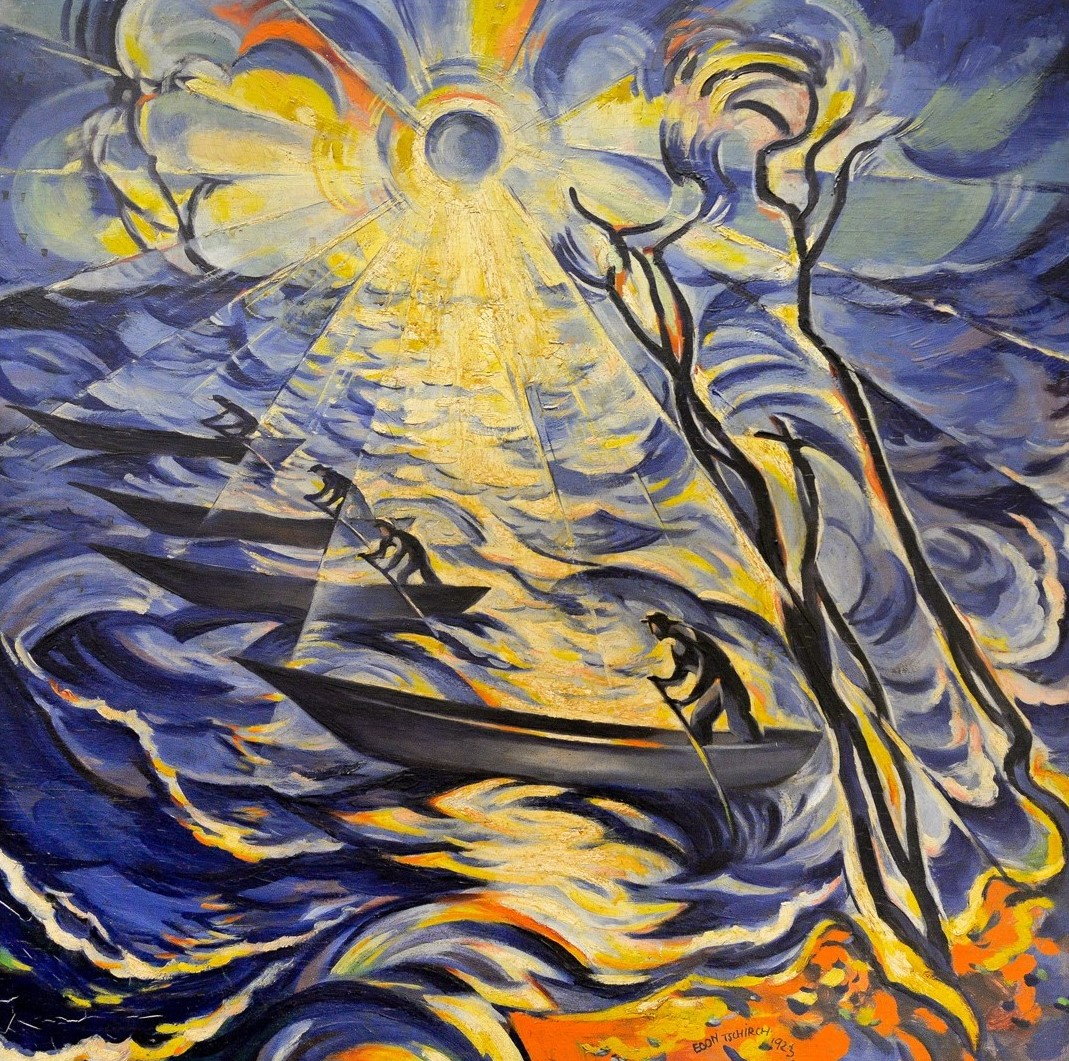
Warnowfischer, Warnow Fishermen (1923)

From 1907 to 1912, Egon Tschirch attended three prestigious art academies in Berlin. Among his teachers were Bruno Paul and Anton von Werner. In 1919, a study trip to Southern France and Tunisia awakened his preference for vibrant colours. Tschirch fought in World War I. After being injured, he worked at the Imperial army press office in Berlin, producing posters for the department of pictorial propaganda from 1916 to the end of the war. These posters featured darkly colored war targets with corresponding text and messages encouraging wartime perseverance. He returned to Rostock after the war.

== Artistic breakthrough in the Weimar Republic ==
His most important creative period lasted from 1919 to the late 1920s. His productivity and willingness to experiment made him a fitful, yet successful, artist in Mecklenburg during the early Golden Twenties. Some prominent examples of his work during this time were Boats with Fishermen (1922) at the Rostock Museum of Cultural History and Warnow Fishermen (1923) at Rostock Art Gallery. In 1923, Tschirch created his expressionist cycle of paintings centered around the biblical Song of Songs. They were rediscovered in 2015 after being lost for more than 90 years. Tschirch was also considered a master of portrait art who was adept at capturing the character and traits of his clients. Several members of Mecklenburg's bourgeoisie were portrayed by him. Examples of this are the portrait Max Samuel (1920) and the series of twenty Heads (1921), the latter of which was only labeled with numbers.

== Affiliation with Nazism ==
Beginning in the early 1930s, there was little significant artistic development in Tschirch's work. His art consisted of objective and realistic themes. In the emerging era of Nazism, Egon Tschirch identified with national socialist views. In 1931 he joined the Nazi Party. He produced several works on commission in the service of the Nazi regime as well as commissions from private individuals that enabled him to live a comfortable life until the beginning of the Second World War.

When the Holocaust, the genocide of Jews by Nazi Germany, began and his hometown was destroyed in 1942, Tschirch began to criticise the Nazi regime. One of his paintings from this time hangs in St. Mary's Church in Rostock, depicting the church surrounded by the city's ruins.

In 1948, Egon Tschirch died childless in Rostock at the age of 58.

== Reception ==
In the summer of 1937, there were discussions about whether some of his works from the early 1920s should be classified as degenerate art and removed from the State Museum Schwerin. The intervention of advocates on his behalf prevented this.

Tschirch was treated with caution and largely forgotten in East Germany. Since 1998 several exhibitions have taken place in Rostock and Ahrenshoop.

The first monograph on his life and work was published in 2020. Tschirch has a street named after him in Rostock.

== Selected images ==
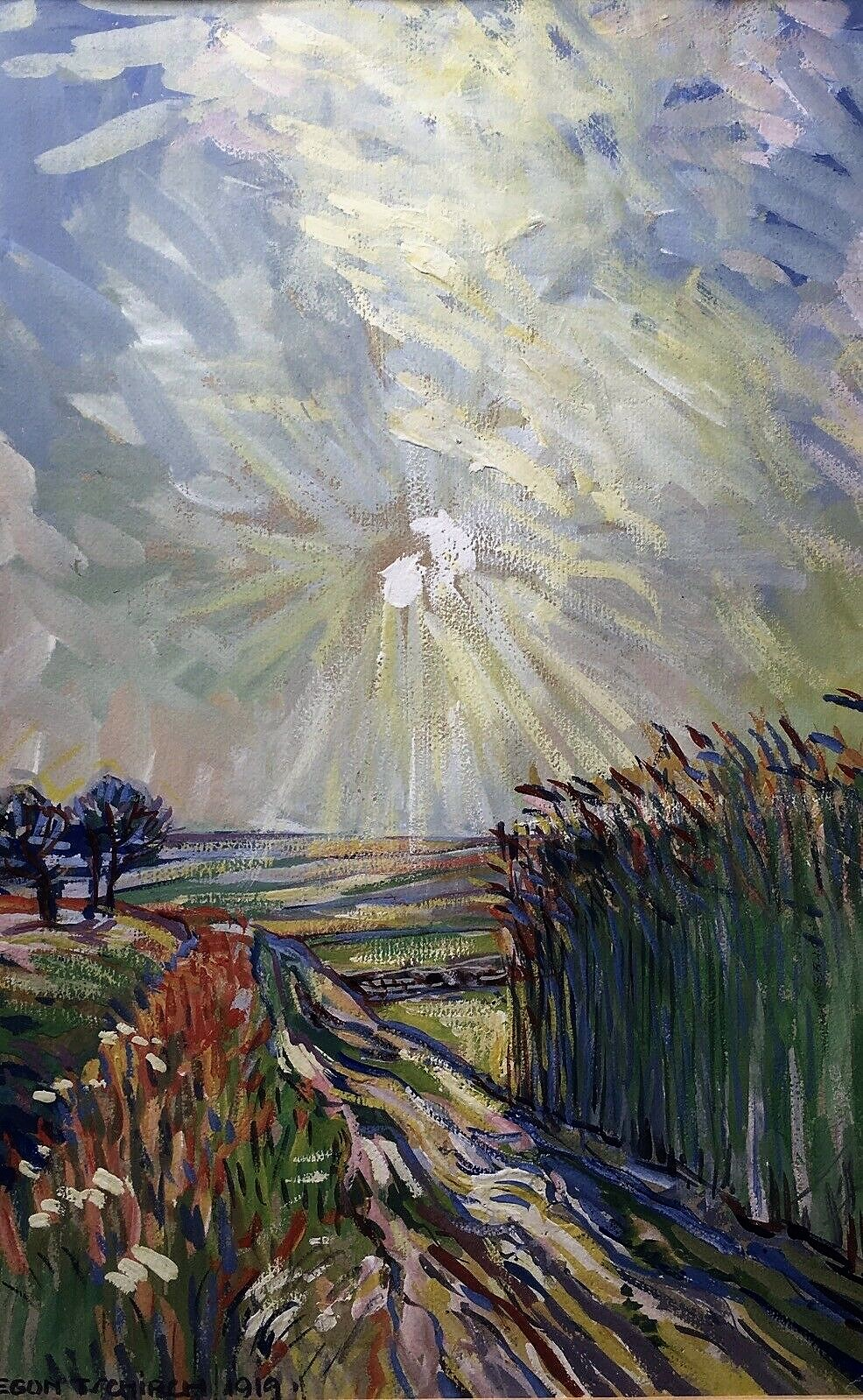
Sommertag, Summer day (1919)

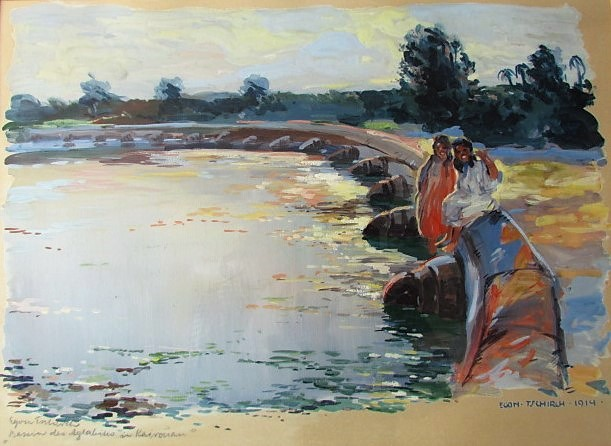
Bassins des Aglabites, Kairouan (Tunisia) (1914)

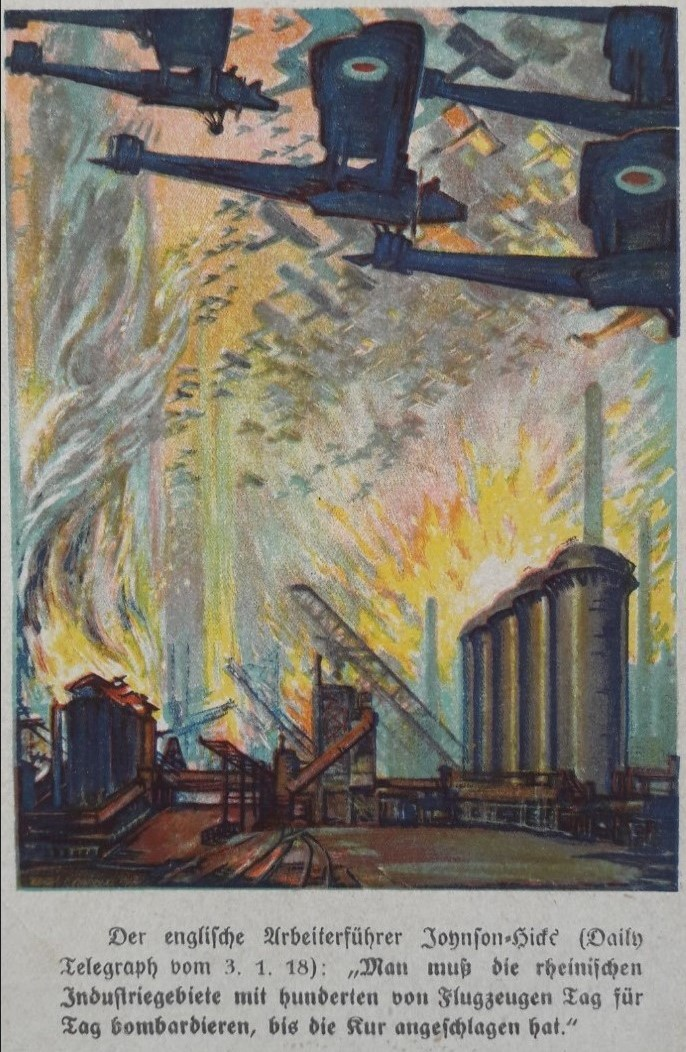
Was der Feind will, What the enemy wants (1917/18)

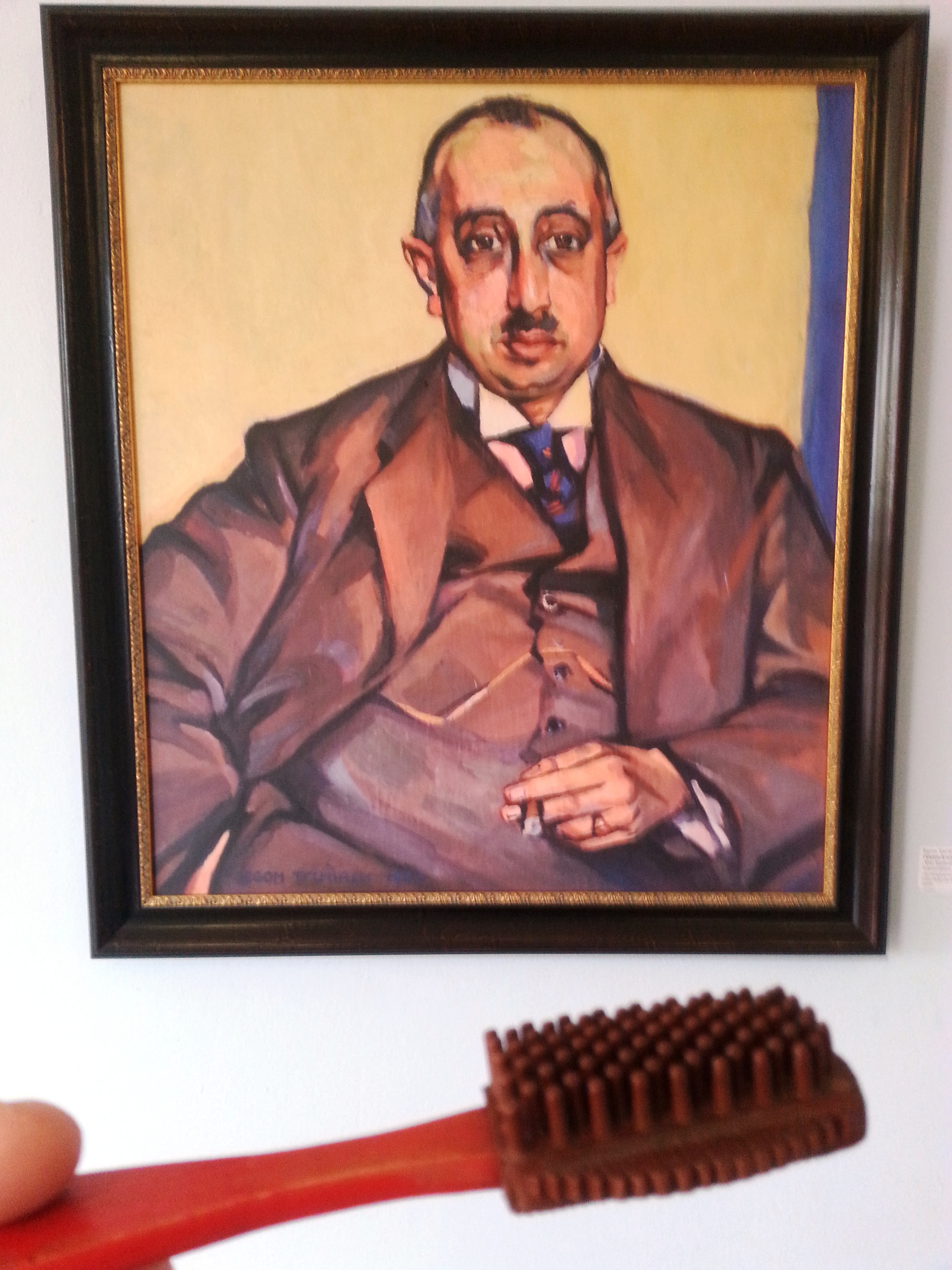
Max Samuel (1920),(Portrait with suede brush)

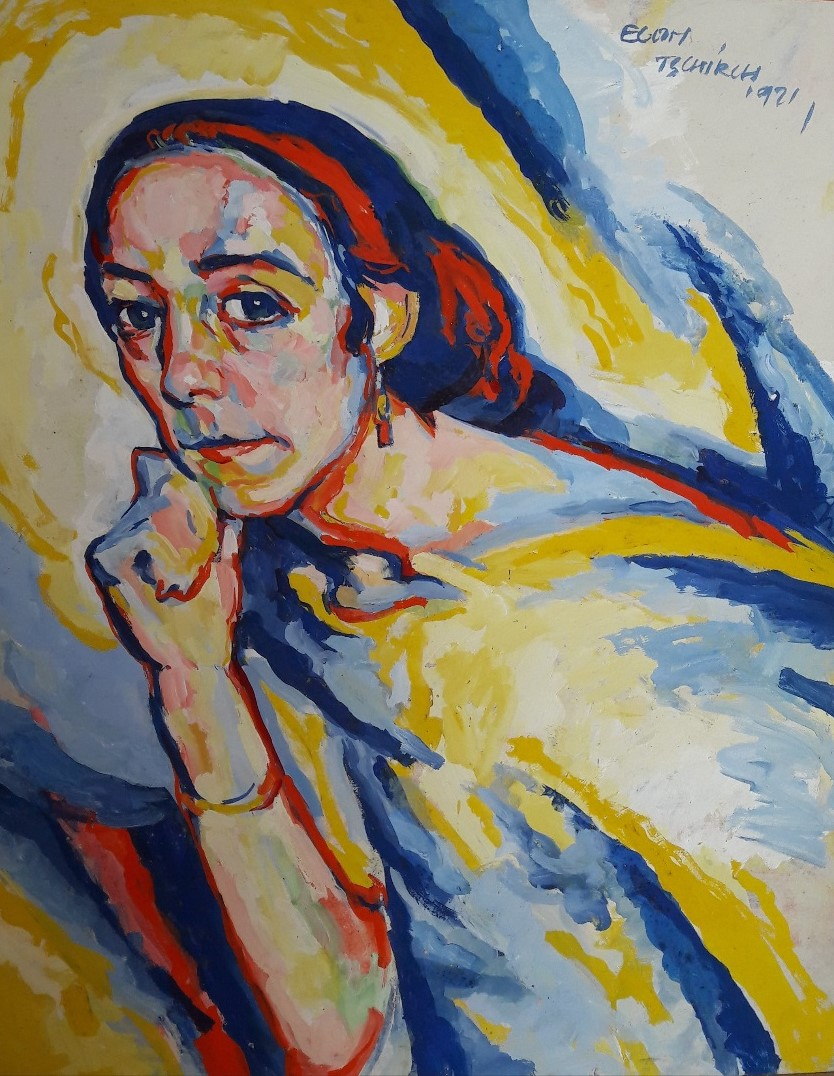
Köpfe, Heads (1921), (Portrait Line Ristow)

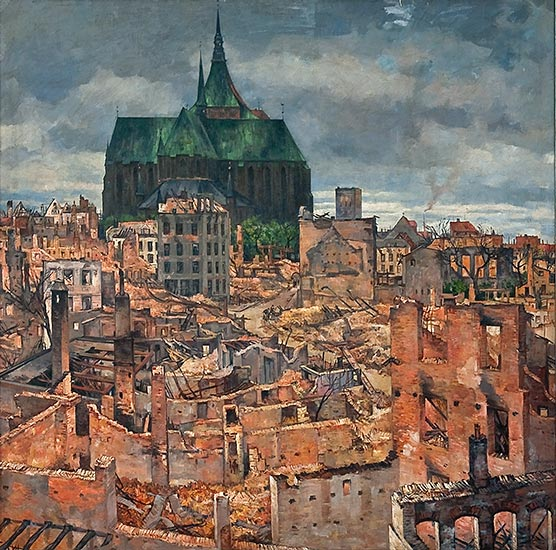
Die zerstörte Stadt, The destroyed town (Rostock)(1942)

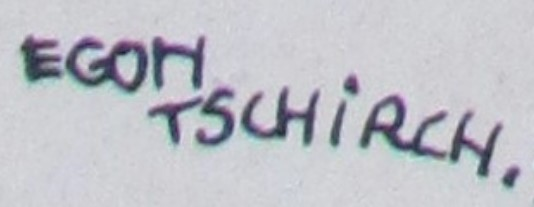
Egon Tschirch´s signature
