= JungdemokratInnen/Junge Linke =

Left-leaning political youth organization in Germany

Young Democrats/Young Left JungdemokratInnen/Junge Linke
- Founded: 1919
- Headquarters: Bonn
- Mother party: German Democratic Party until 1930; Free Democratic Party until 1983

The JungdemokratInnen/Junge Linke (German: JD/JL, Junge Demokraten, JuDos) is a left-leaning political youth organization in Germany, founded in 1919. It was the youth wing associated with the German Democratic Party (DDP) and, after the Second World War, of the Free Democratic Party (FDP) until 1983, after which it became party-independent.

== History ==
The Young Democrats or JuDos, in German, were founded in 1919. They were the official youth wing of the Free Democratic Party (FDP) until 1983. In 1980 the Young Liberals (JuLis) were founded and the two youth organizations existed side by side. The JuLis benefitted from the Wende with the election of CDU party chairman Helmut Kohl as the new Chancellor in October 1982, after which the FDP recognized the JuLis as the official FDP youth wing in 1983. The Young Democrats split from the FDP and became a party-independent youth organization.
