= AStA =

Allgemeiner Studierendenausschuss
- General Students' Committee
- Allgemeiner Studierendenausschuss
- Abbreviation: AStA
- Type: Student government, Executive Body
- Purpose: Student representation, social and political activism
- Region served: Germany
- Services: Legal advice, BAföG counseling, social services, cultural events
- Main organ: Student Parliament (StuPa)

The General Students' Committee (German: Allgemeiner Studierendenausschuss) or AStA, is the acting executive board and the external representing agency of the (constituted) student body at universities in most German states. It is therefore considered the student government and student representative organization. The AStA fulfills a similar function as the Students' Union at a British university.

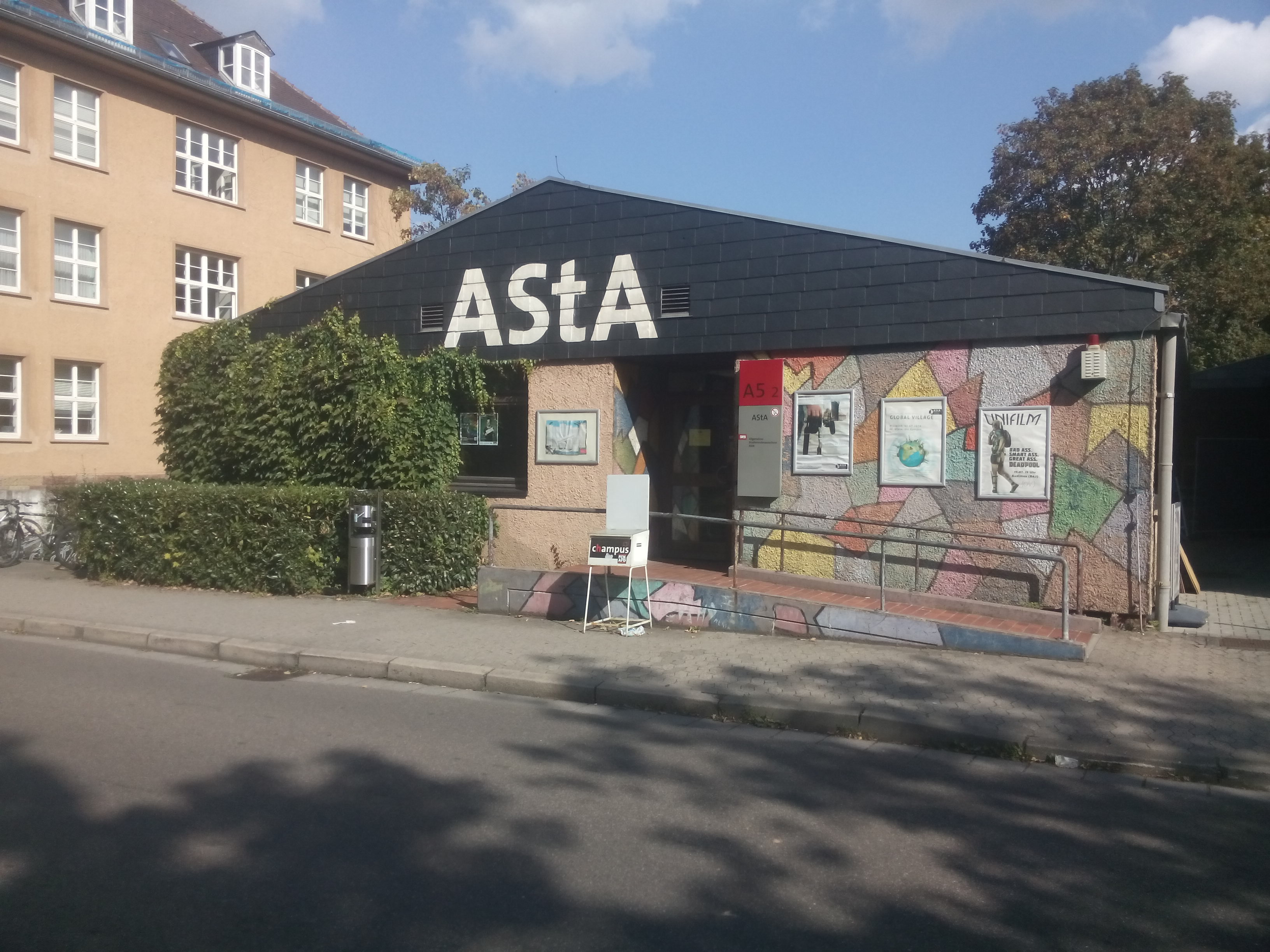
The AStA headquarters at Saarland University

== Committee ==
AStA committees are usually elected by the student parliament and consist of one or more chairpersons as well as a set of consultants from different fields of study. Sometimes AStA includes so called Autonome Referate (Autonomous consultants) representing minorities which are elected by the members of their peer groups (not by student parliament).

== See also ==
- Student voice
