= Song of Songs (disambiguation) =

The Song of Songs is a book of the Hebrew Bible or Old Testament.

Song of Songs may also refer to:

== Films ==
- The Song of Songs (1918 film), based on Edward Sheldon's 1914 play
- The Song of Songs (1922 film), a German silent film
- The Song of Songs (1933 film), partially based on the Sheldon play, starring Marlene Dietrich and Brian Aherne
- Song of Songs (2005 film), starring Natalie Press and Joel Chalfen, directed by Josh Appignanesi
- Song of Songs (2015 film)

== Literature ==
- The Song of Songs (novel), 1908, by Hermann Sudermann
- "The Song of Songs", a poem by Wilfred Owen
- "The Song of Songs", a story in the 1930 P. G. Wodehouse collection Very Good, Jeeves

== Music ==
- Song of Songs, a cantata by Lukas Foss, 1946
- Song of Songs, a 1977 album by David and the Giants
- Song of Songs (album), 1972, by Woody Shaw
- Shir Hashirim (album), a 2013 album by composer John Zorn

== Plays ==
- Song of Songs (Giraudoux), a 1938 play
- The Song of Songs (play), a 1914 play by Edward Sheldon based on Hermann Sudermann's novel
- The Song of Songs (Giesmių giesmė), a play directed by Eimuntas Nekrošius in 2005

== Other ==
- Song of Songs (Egon Tschirch), a 1920s picture cycle

== See also ==
- Shir Hashirim (disambiguation)
- Canticle (disambiguation)
