= Shir Hashirim (disambiguation) =

Shir Hashirim is Hebrew for the erotic poem The Song of Songs.

Shir Hashirim may also refer to:

- Shir Hashirim (album), 2008 album of vocal music by John Zorn
- Shir Hashirim (film), 1935 Yiddish-language film adaptation of the operetta
- Shir Hashirim (operetta), 1911 operetta by Anshel Schorr with music by Joseph Rumshinsky

== See also ==
- Song of Songs (disambiguation)
