= Canticle (disambiguation) =

A canticle is a hymn, psalm or other song of praise taken from biblical or holy texts other than the Psalms.

Canticle or canticles may also refer to:

- Canticle, a book in The Cleric Quintet by R. A. Salvatore
- Canticle, a 2009 book by Ken Scholes in the Psalms of Isaak series
- "Scarborough Fair/Canticle", a 1968 setting by Simon & Garfunkel
- Canticles, another name for the Song of Songs (Song of Solomon)
- Canticles (Britten), a series of five musical works by Benjamin Britten

== See also ==
- A Canticle for Leibowitz, 1960 novel by Walter M. Miller, Jr.
- Song of Songs (disambiguation)
