= Song of Songs (Egon Tschirch) =

1923 paintings by Egon Tschirch

Song of Songs, No. 11
- Das Hohelied Salomos (German)
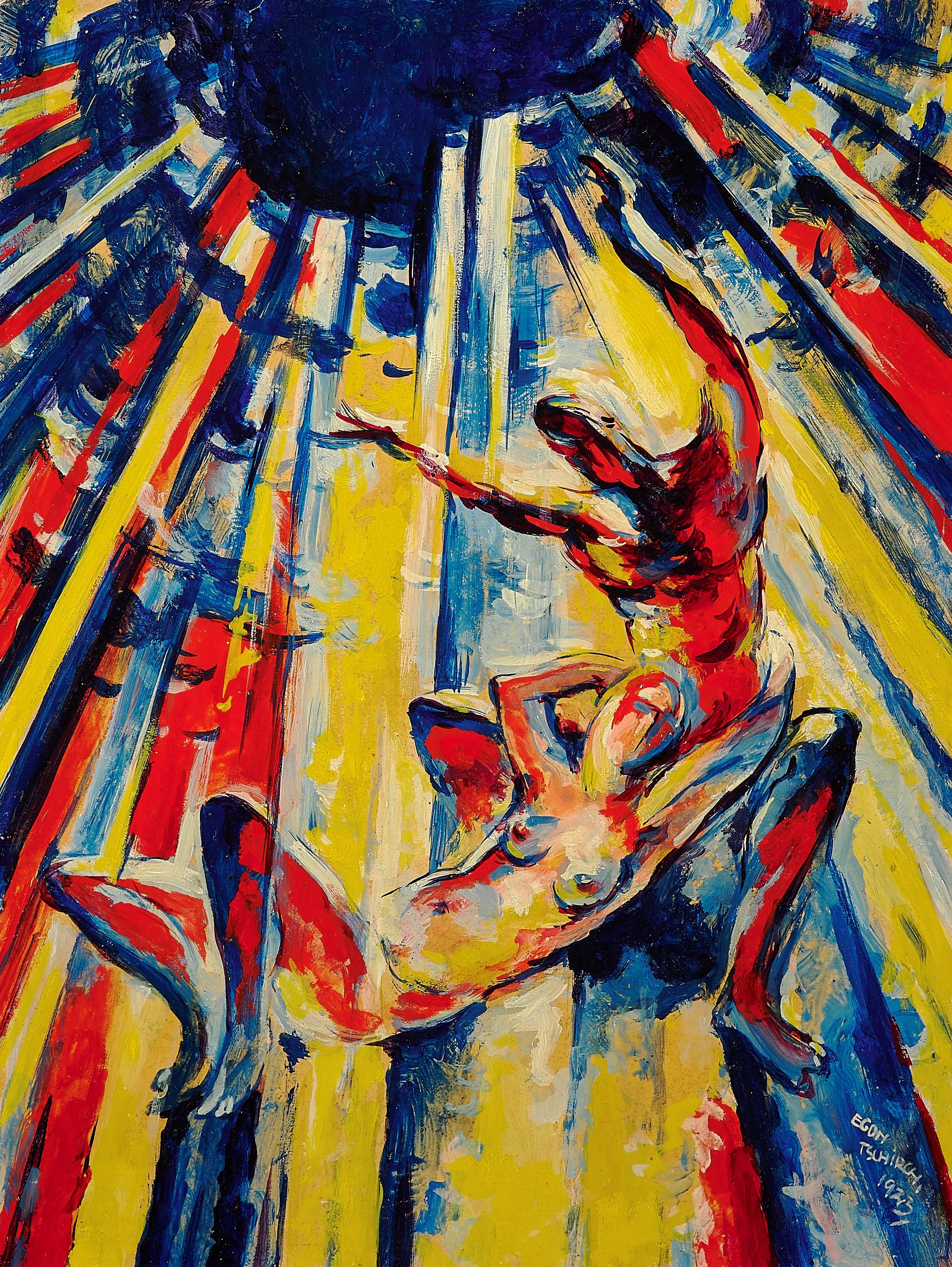
- Artist: Egon Tschirch
- Year: 1923
- Type: tempera on cardboard
- Dimensions: 64 cm × 47 cm (25 in × 19 in)
- Location: Ahrenshoop Art Museum, Germany

The Song of Songs (German: Das Hohelied Salomos, pronounced [das hoːəˈliːt ˈzaːlomos]) is an expressionist painting cycle created by German painter Egon Tschirch in 1923.

Therein Tschirch interprets the texts of the Song of Songs from the Old Testament. The artwork was lost for more than 90 years until it was rediscovered in 2015.

== Description and interpretation ==
Tschirch had his most experimental phase in the early 1920s. He developed a style characterized by the use of the primary colors red, yellow and blue. The saturated colors and the expressive, dynamic compositions of his works are present in this series of paintings.

During this period Tschirch's intellectual involvement turned to the texts from the Old Testament's Song of Solomon. In his series of paintings, he depicted a man and a woman alternating in professing their love for one another, using interplay to extol their longing and fulfillment, separation and reunion. Throughout this time Tschirch created more than 50 painted sheets of interpretations. These paintings depicted themes such as the power of nature, the sensuality and the spirit in these paintings that reportedly invoke a cathartic effect. Tschirch also used light and shadow to depict warmth and coldness in nature. Tschirch selected 19 of his works on this topic and numbered them by the order in which he intended them to be arranged in expositions and when on display.

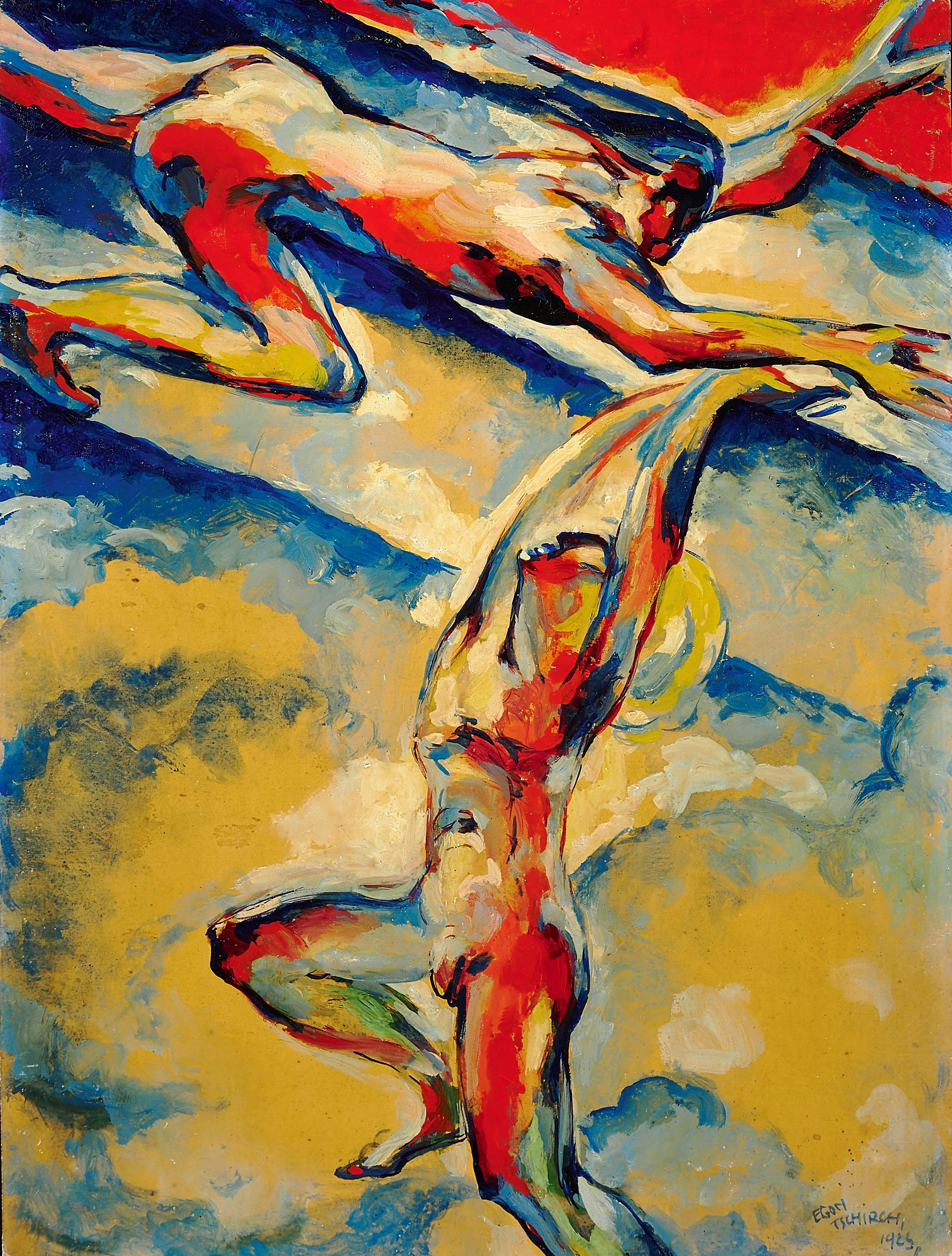
No. 1

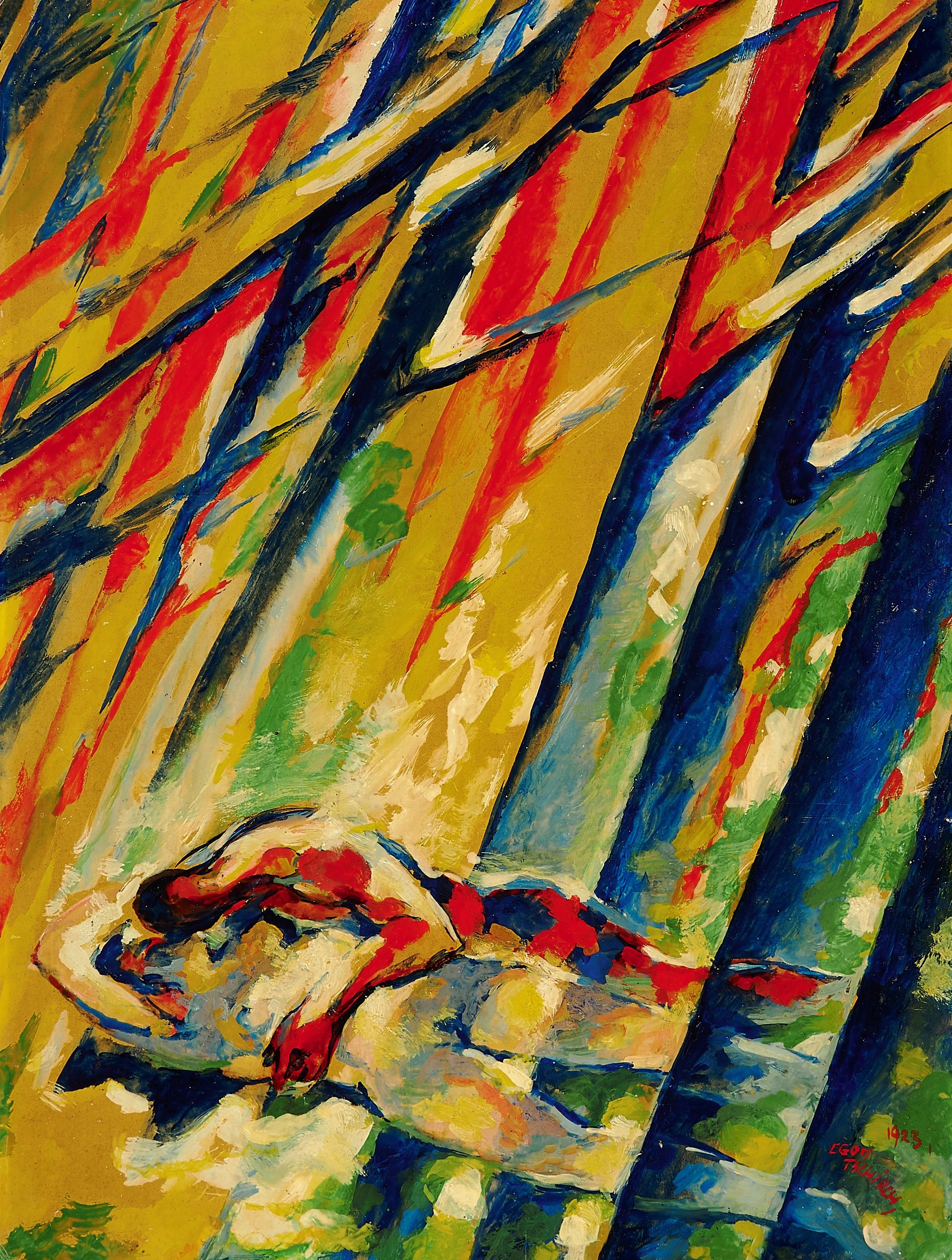
No. 2

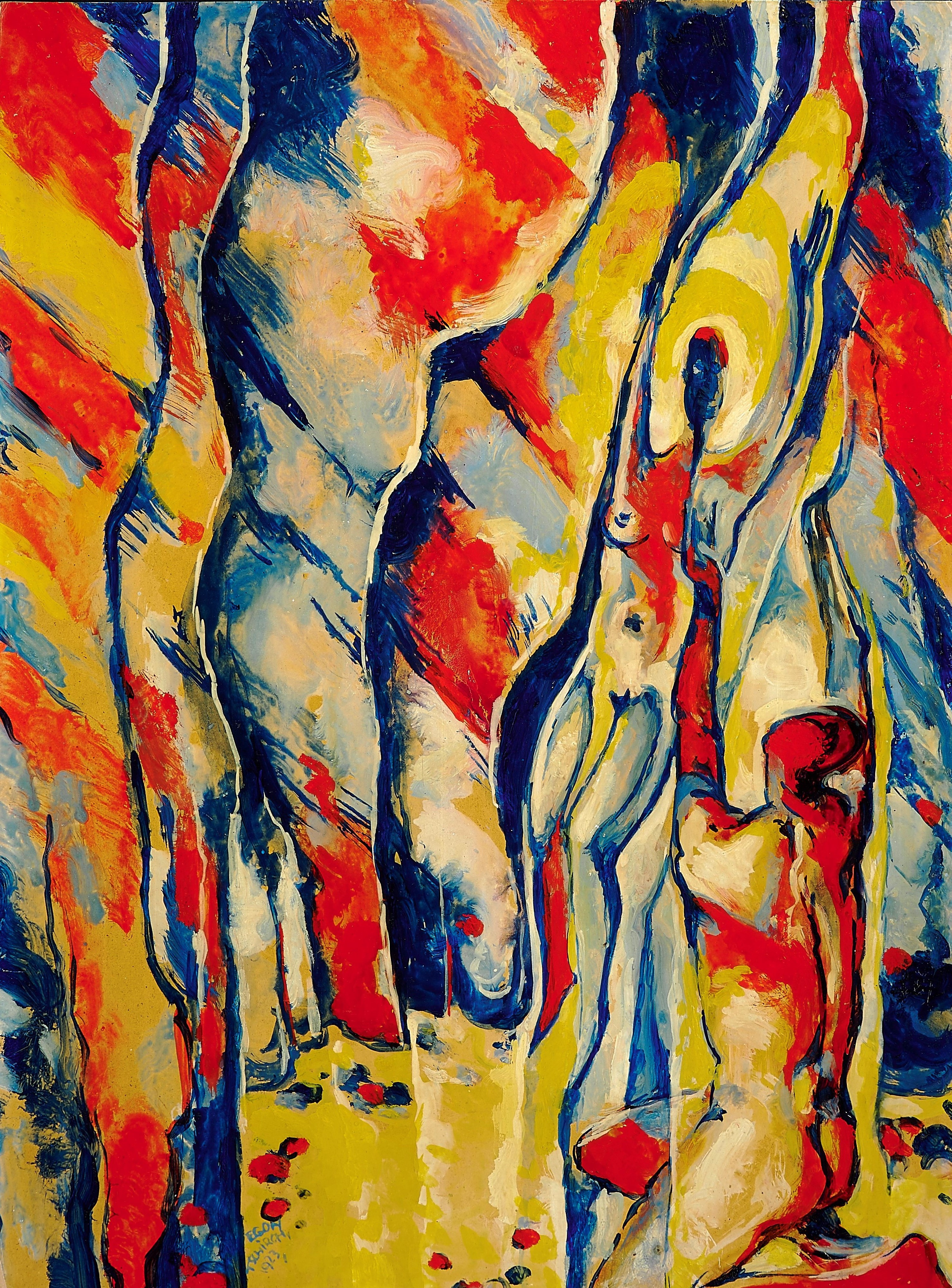
No. 3

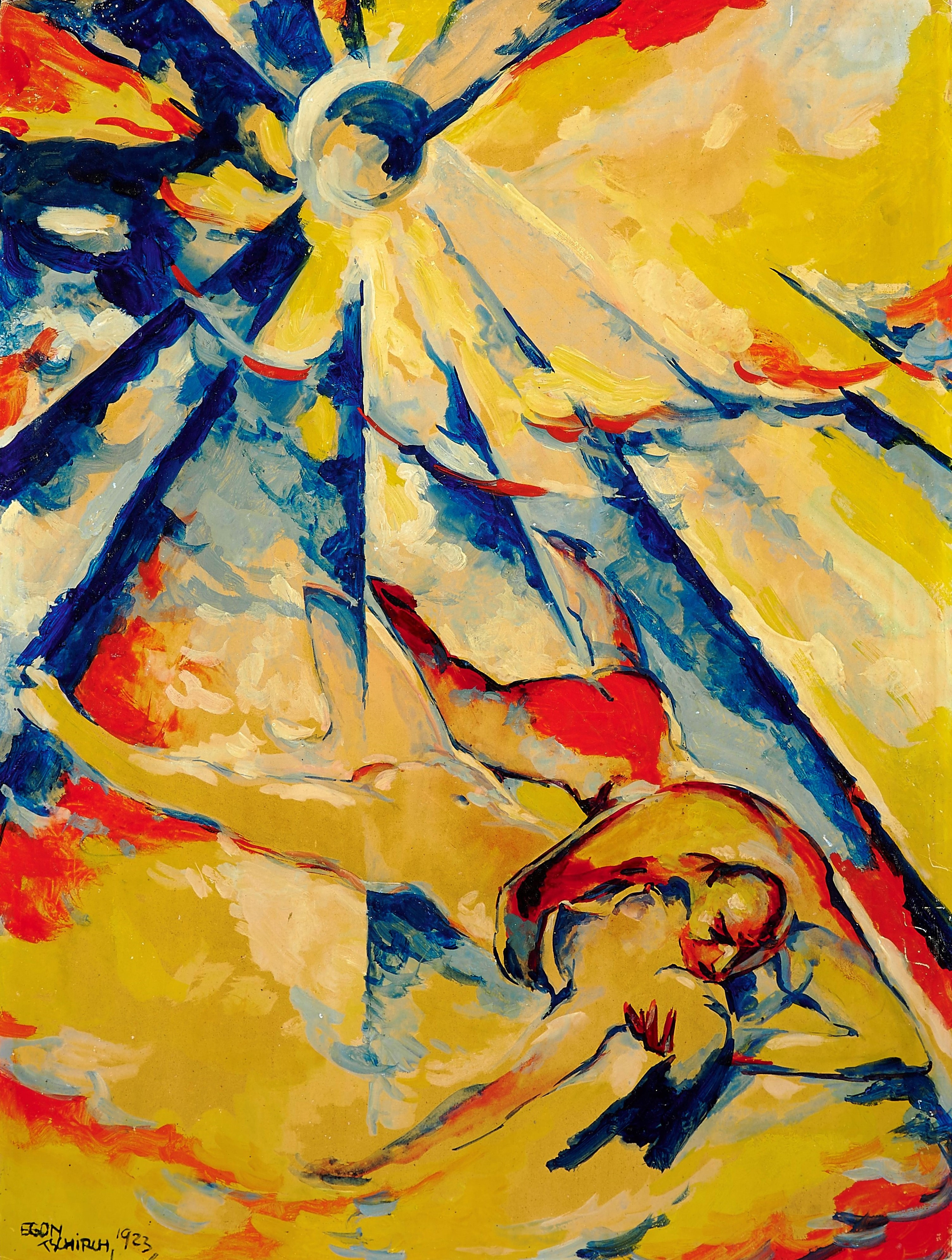
No. 4

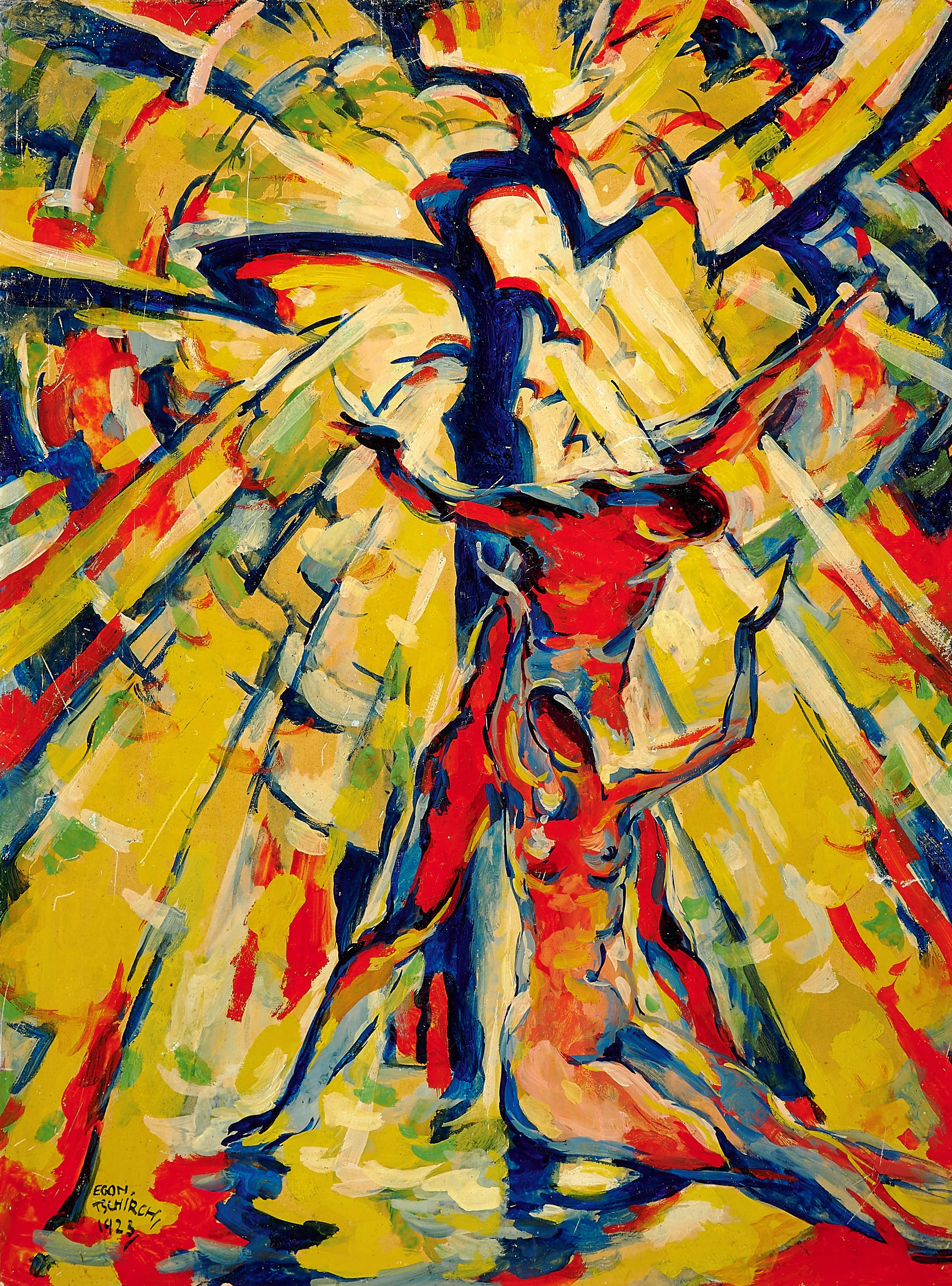
No. 5

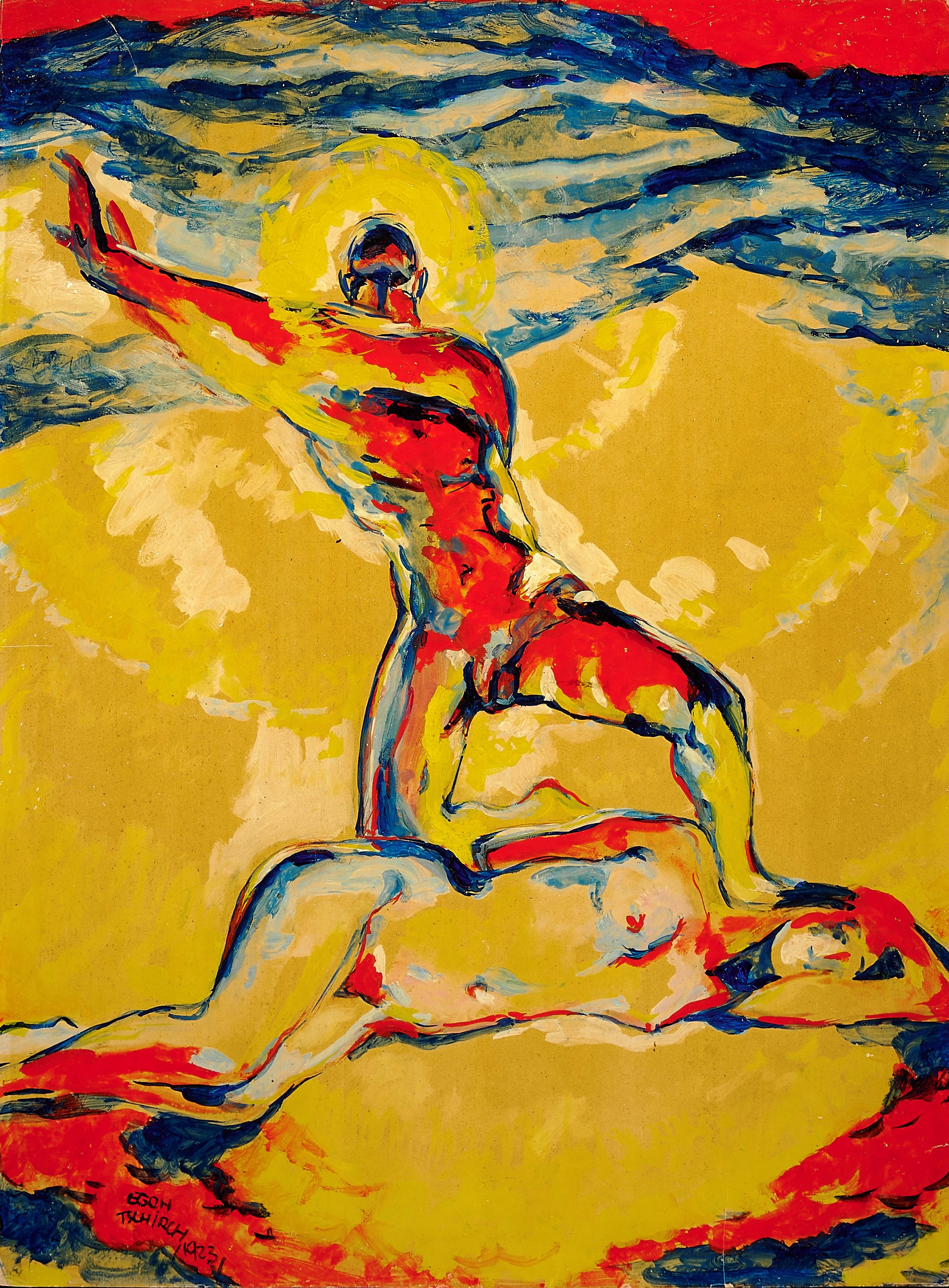
No. 6

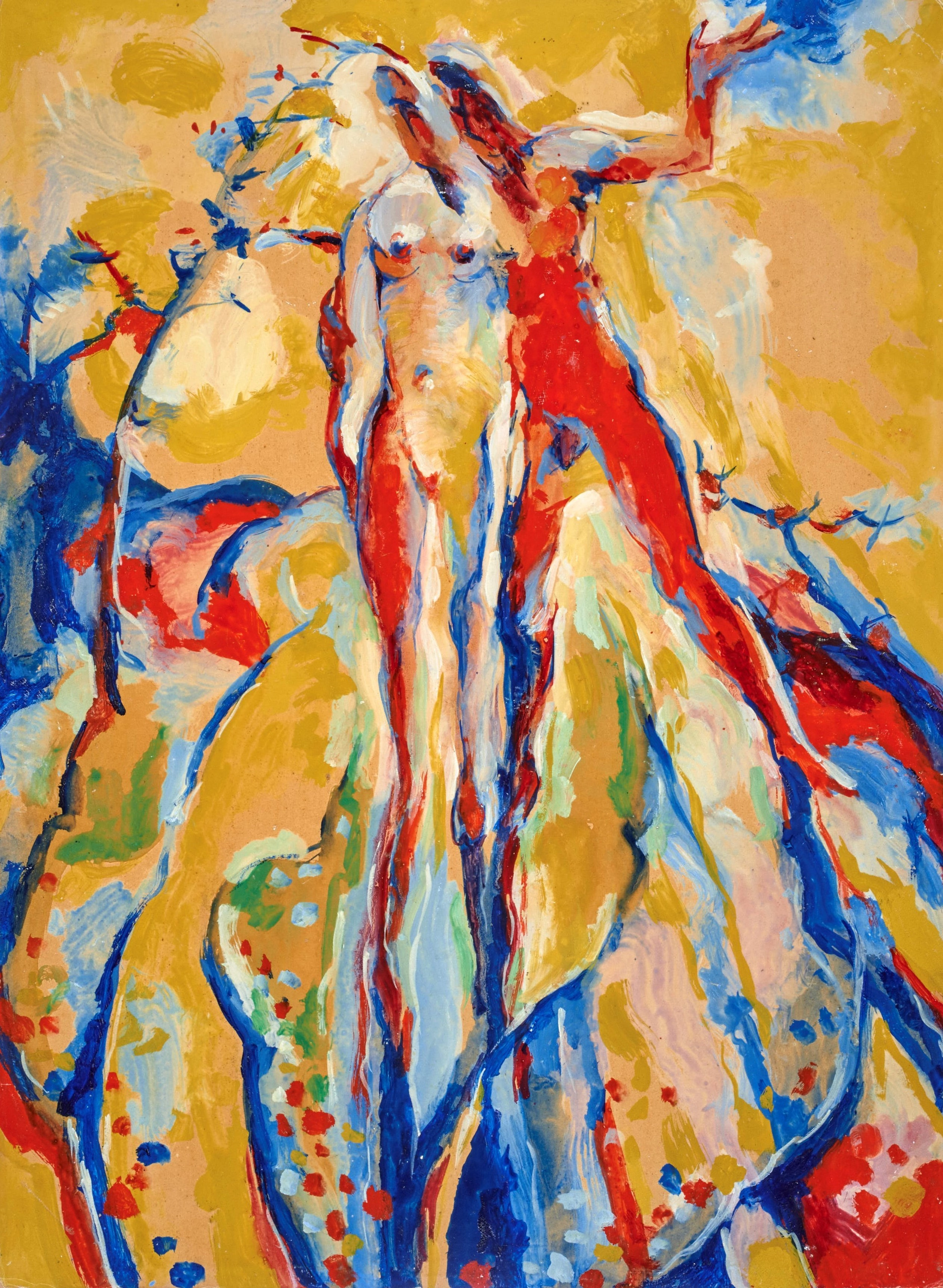
No. 7

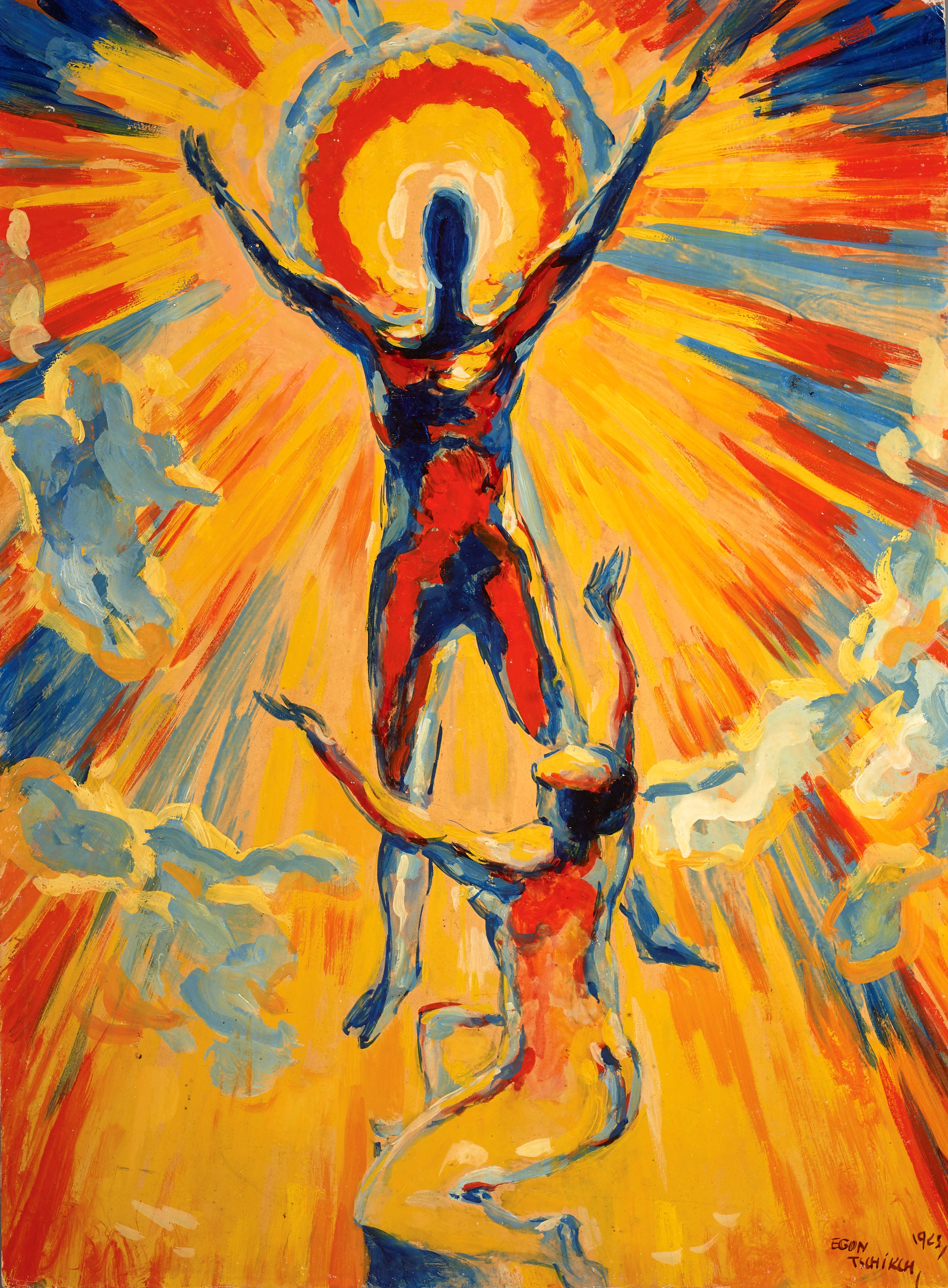
No. 8

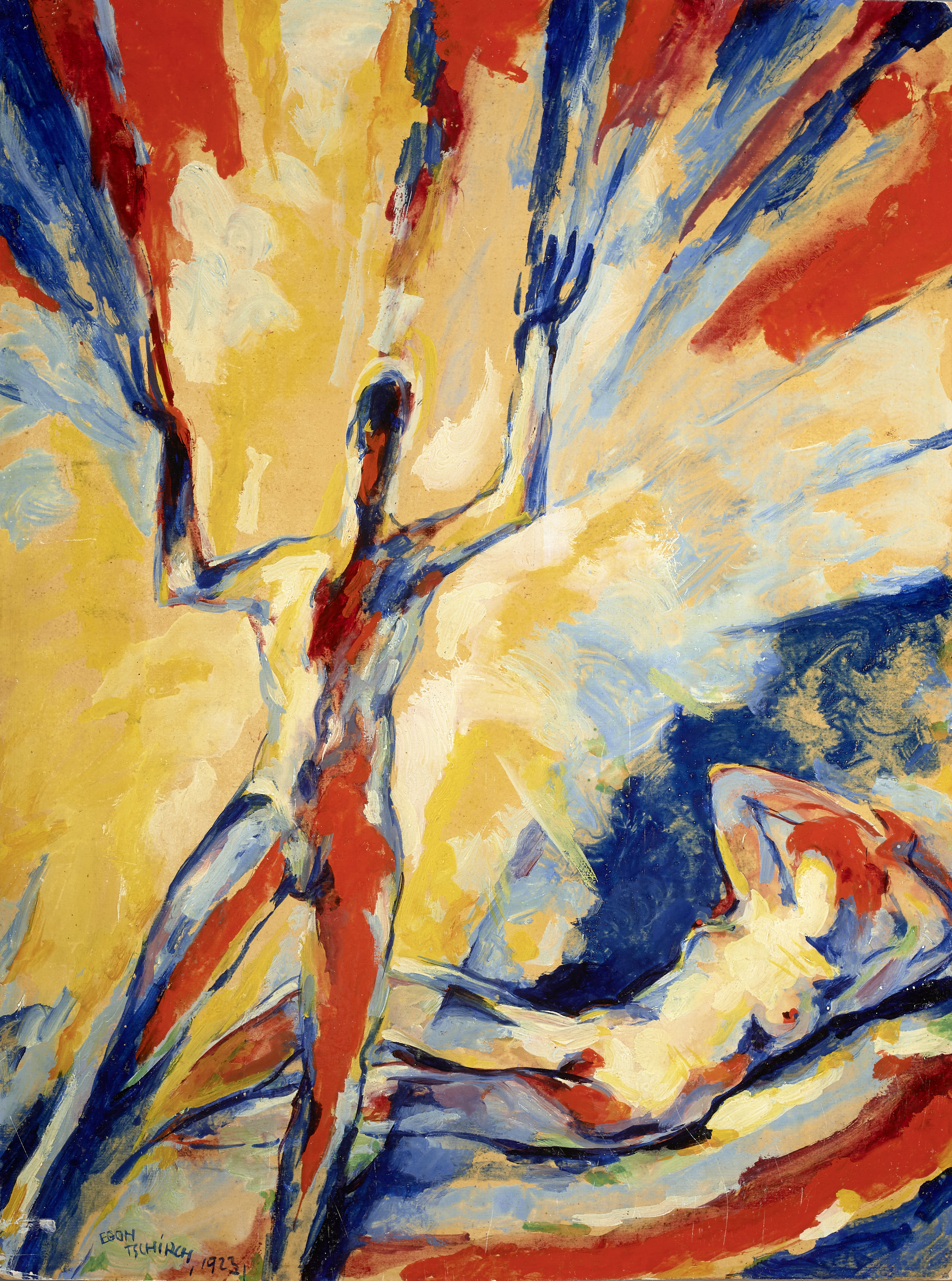
No. 9

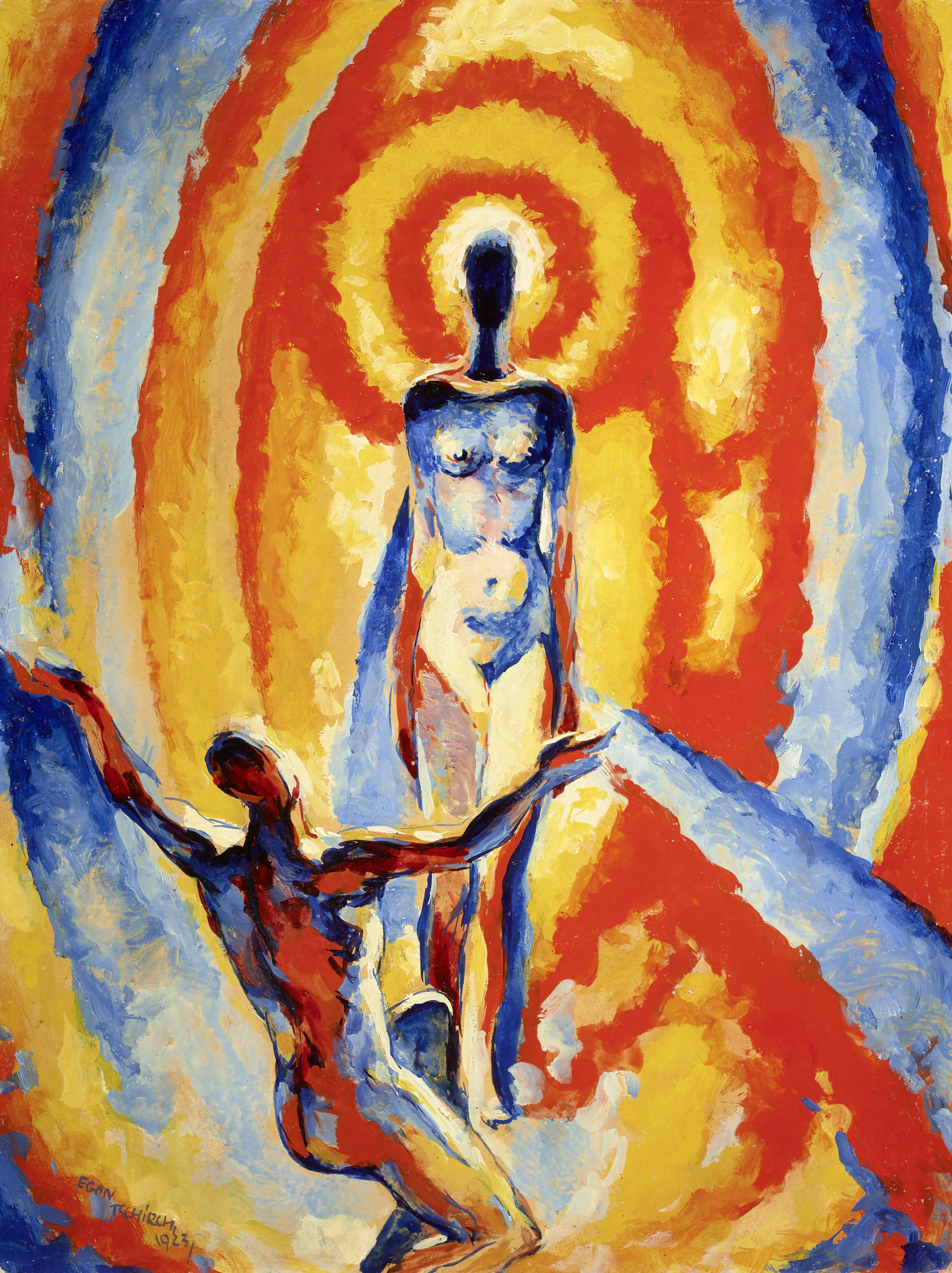
No. 10

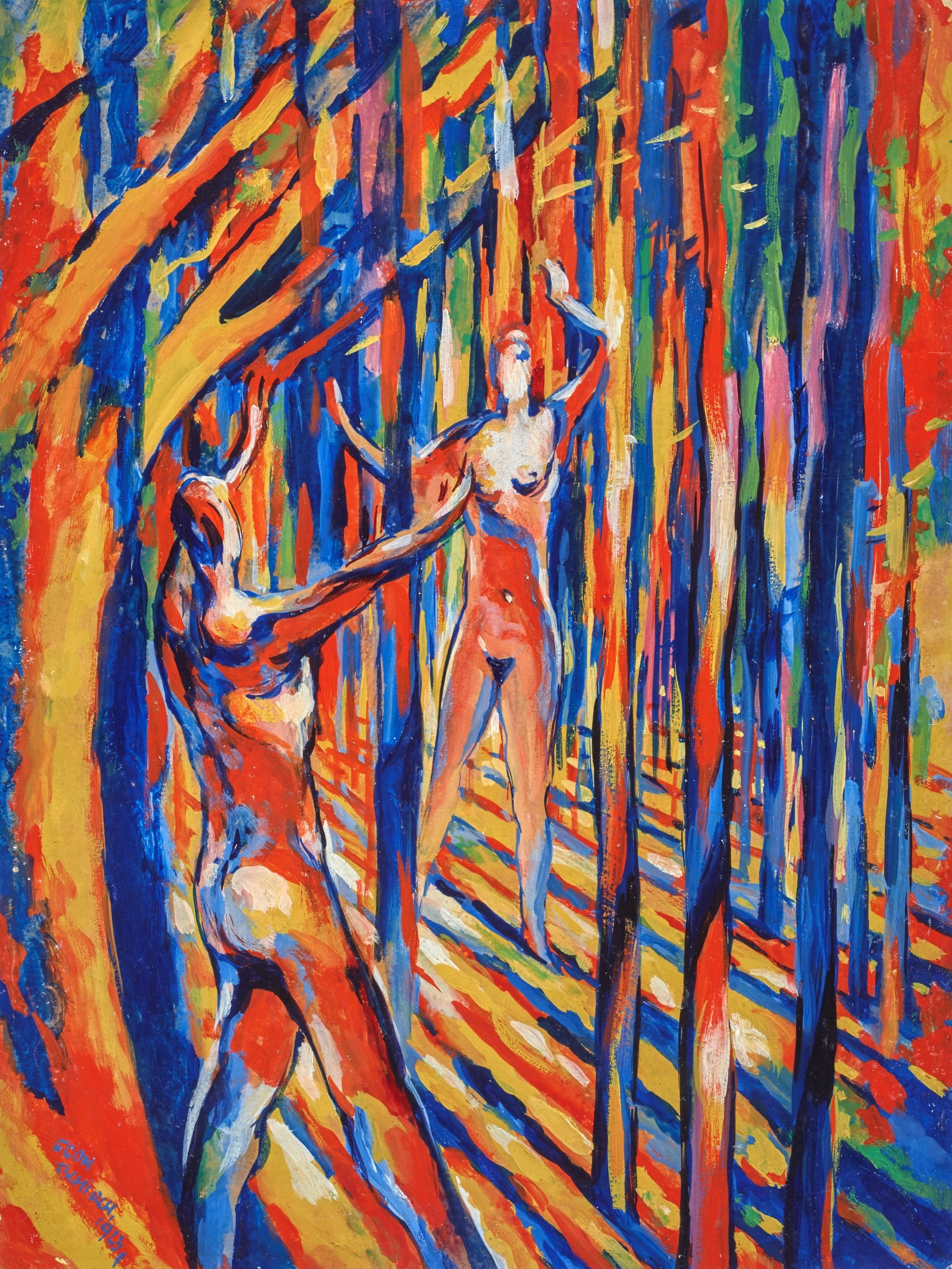
No. 12

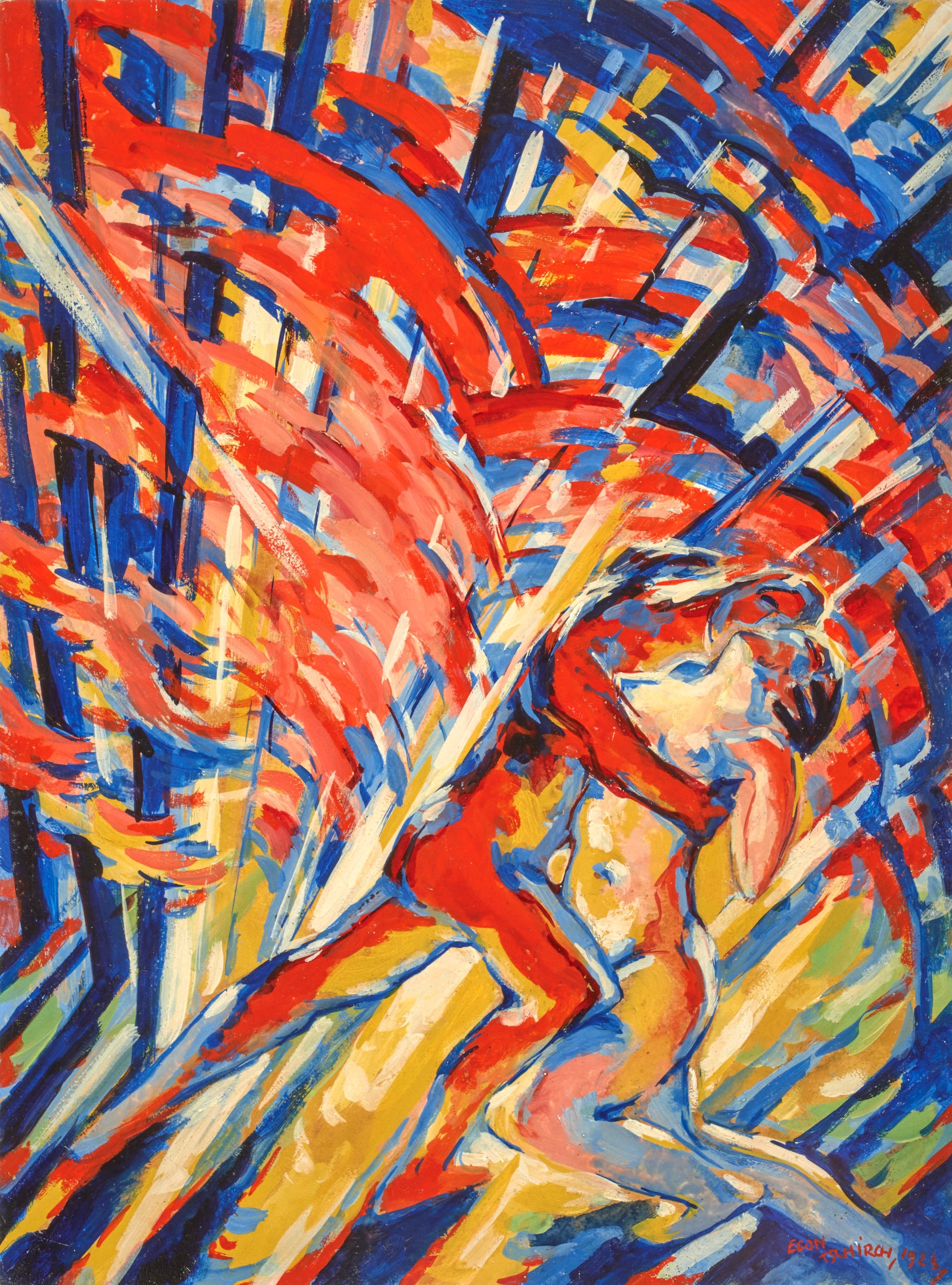
No. 13

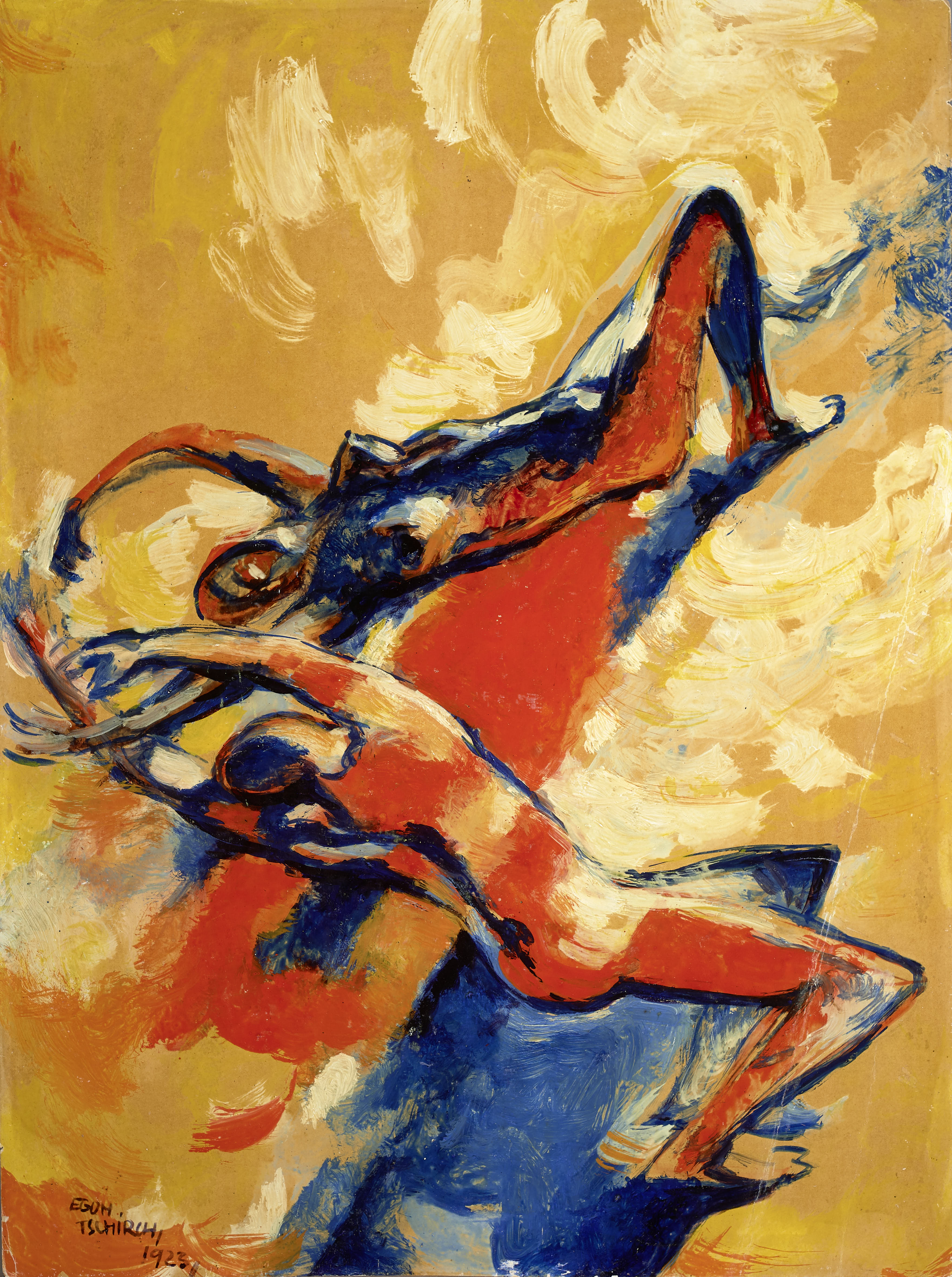
No. 14

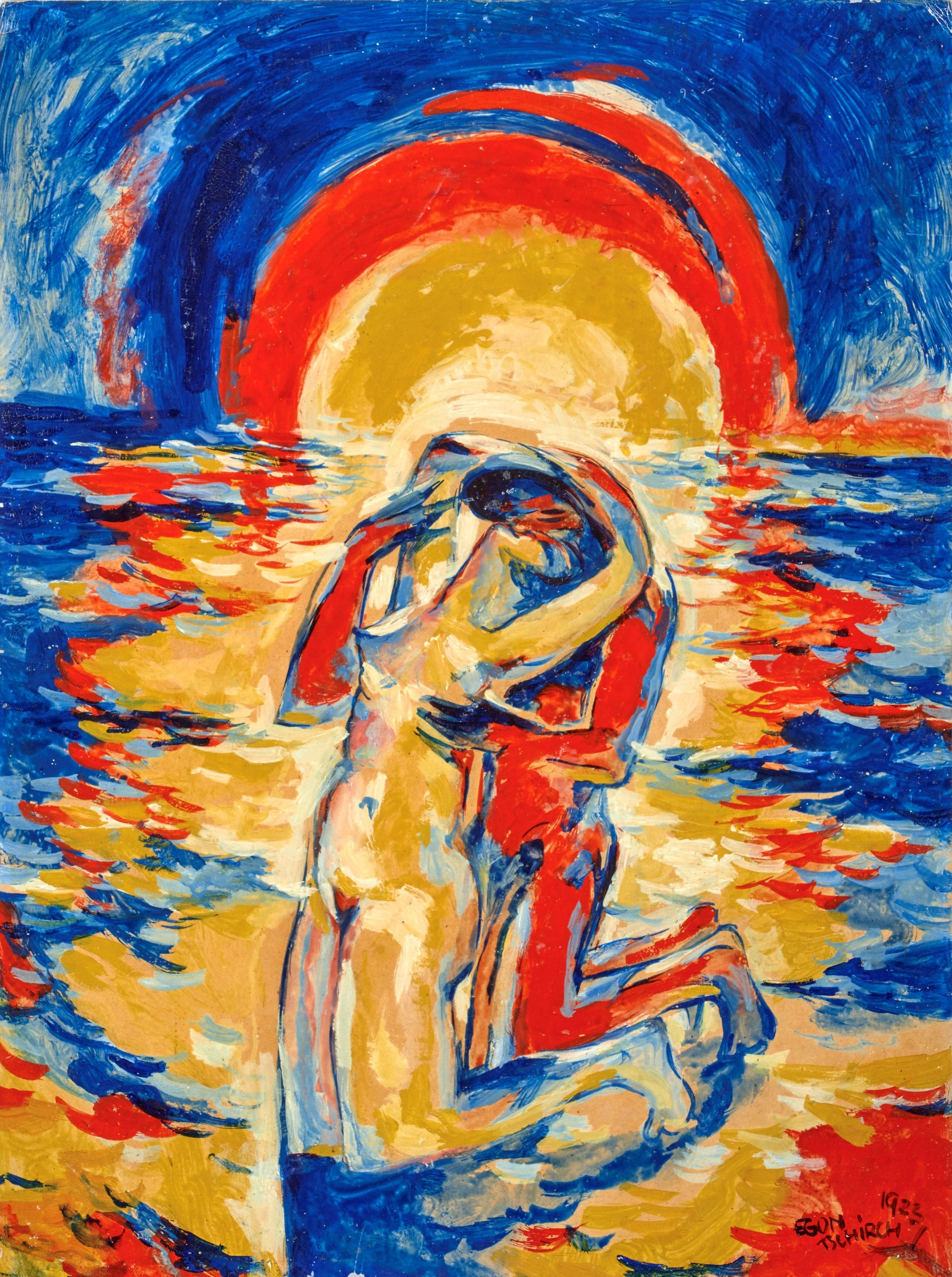
No. 15

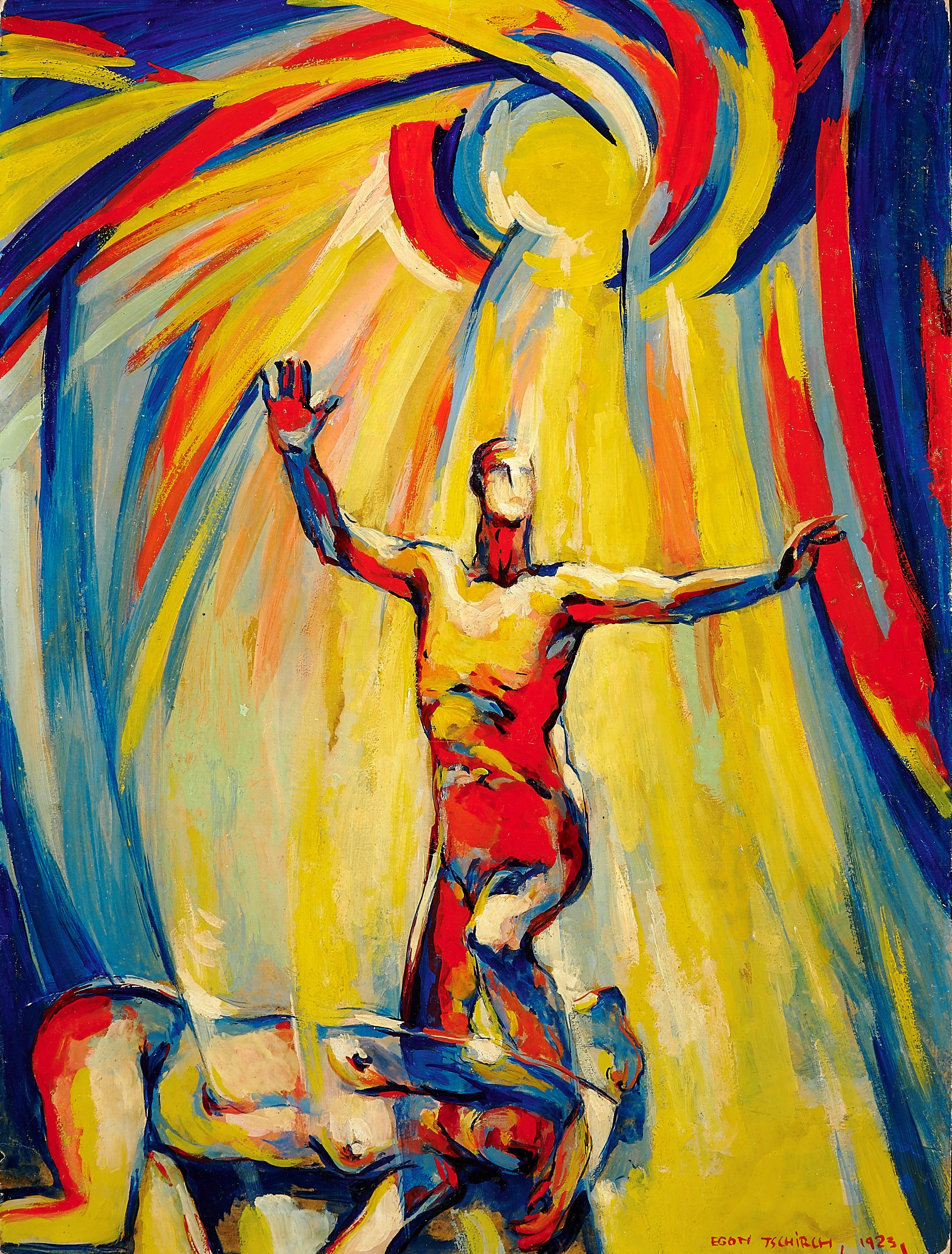
No. 16

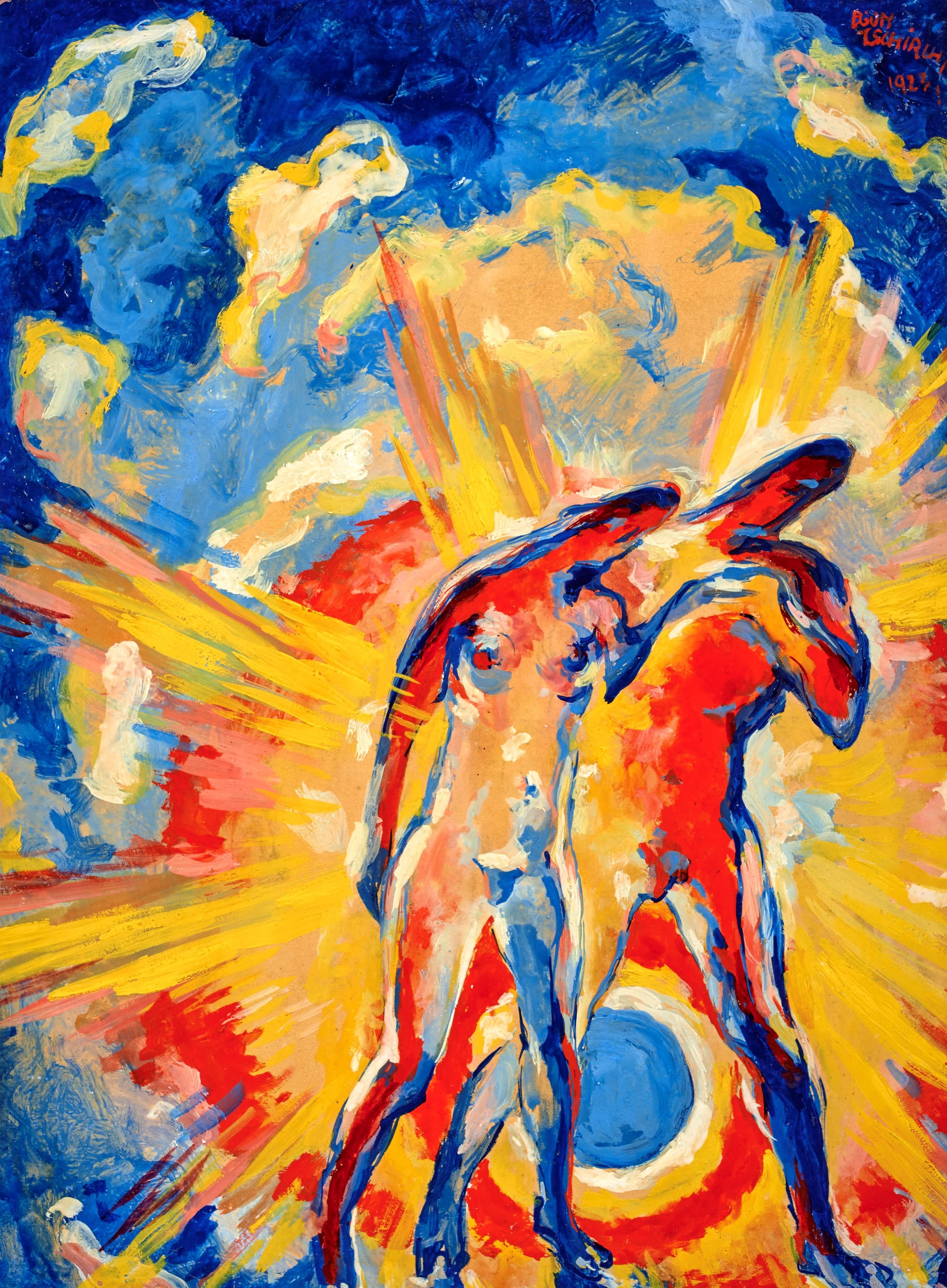
No. 17

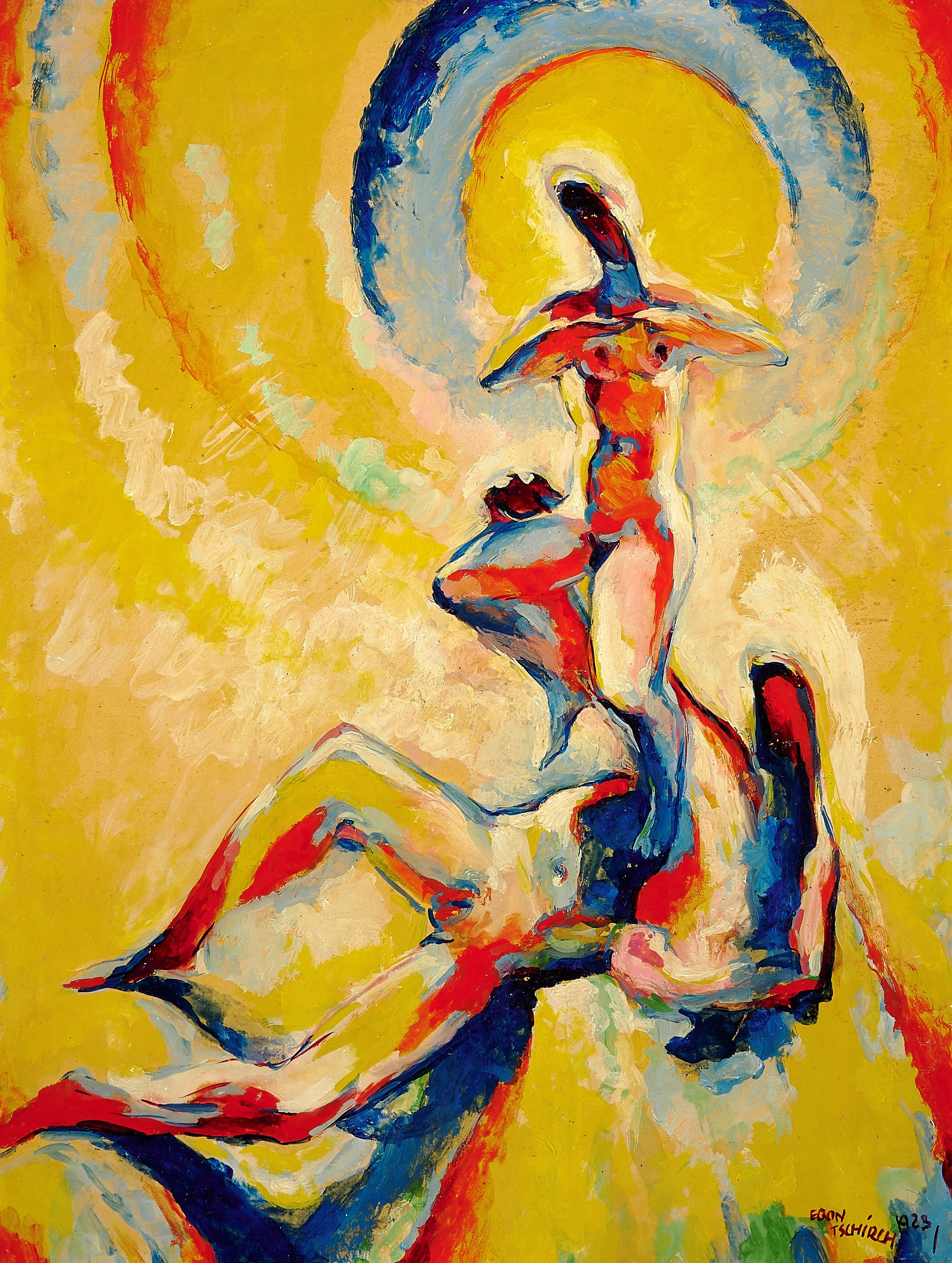
No. 18

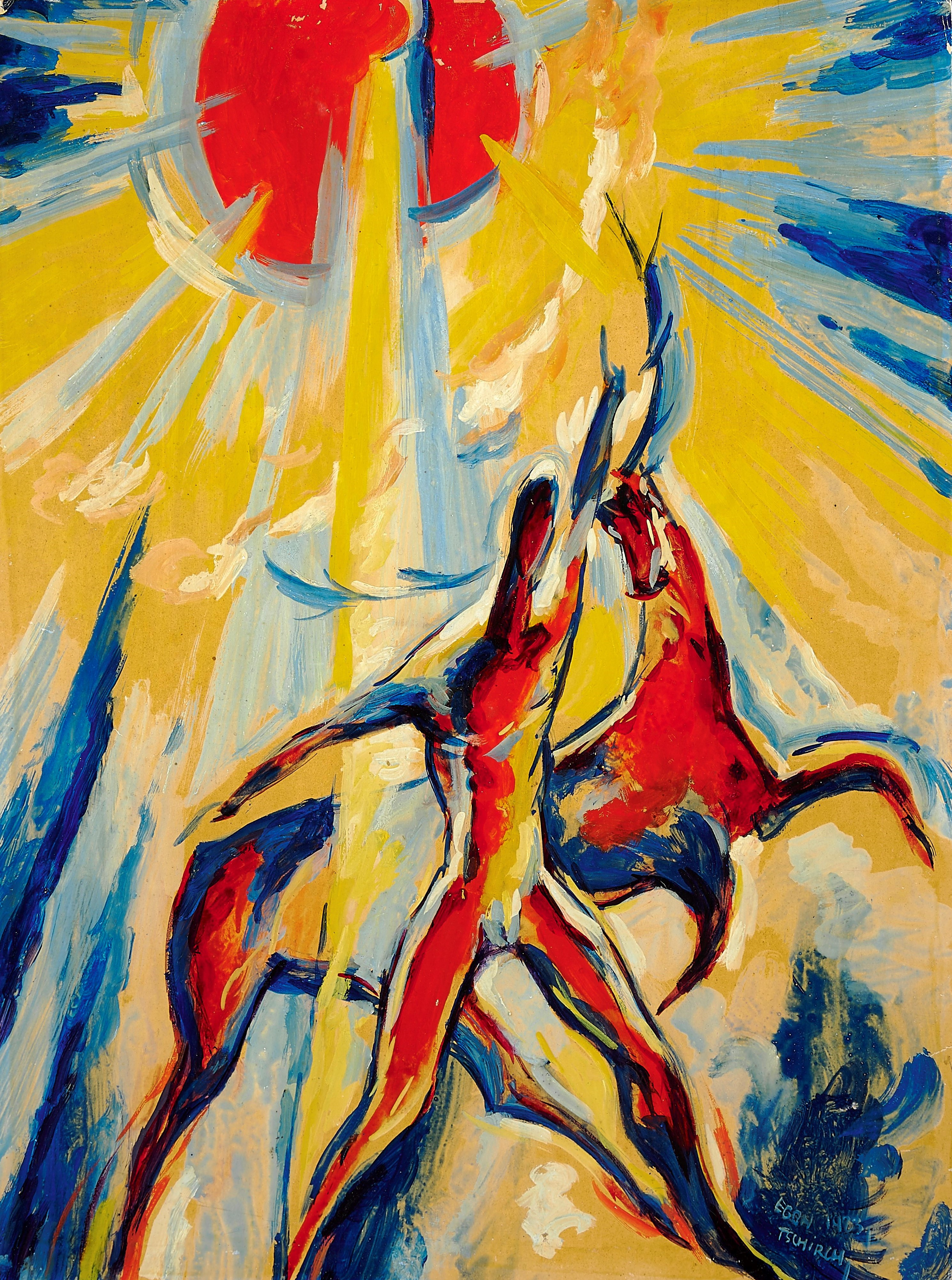
No. 19

== Background and history ==
Since 1913, Egon Tschirch had been working on the topic of the Song of Solomon, with interruptions due to the ongoing World War I. On April 1, 1923 (Easter Sunday), his exhibit including these paintings opened in the city museum of Rostock. It was met with critical acclaim, and thus in 1924, the state museum in Schwerin also showed this cycle of paintings.

Afterwards, the works were transferred to private ownership of a decorative painter in Rostock, who was a friend of Tschirch's. Following this man's death in 1928, the paintings were transferred to his heirs, then left in a basement in Berlin, not far from the Kurfürstendamm, and forgotten. The works were rescued by chance when they were discarded in 2008 and rediscovered in 2015. Using newspaper reviews from the 1920s, the theme of the works was recognized as belonging to the Song of Solomon cycle. The find encompassed a total of 32 original works, including all 19 numbered sheets as well as 13 studies.

In 2017, for the first time in 93 years, all paintings in this cycle were placed on permanent public display in the Ahrenshoop Art Museum.

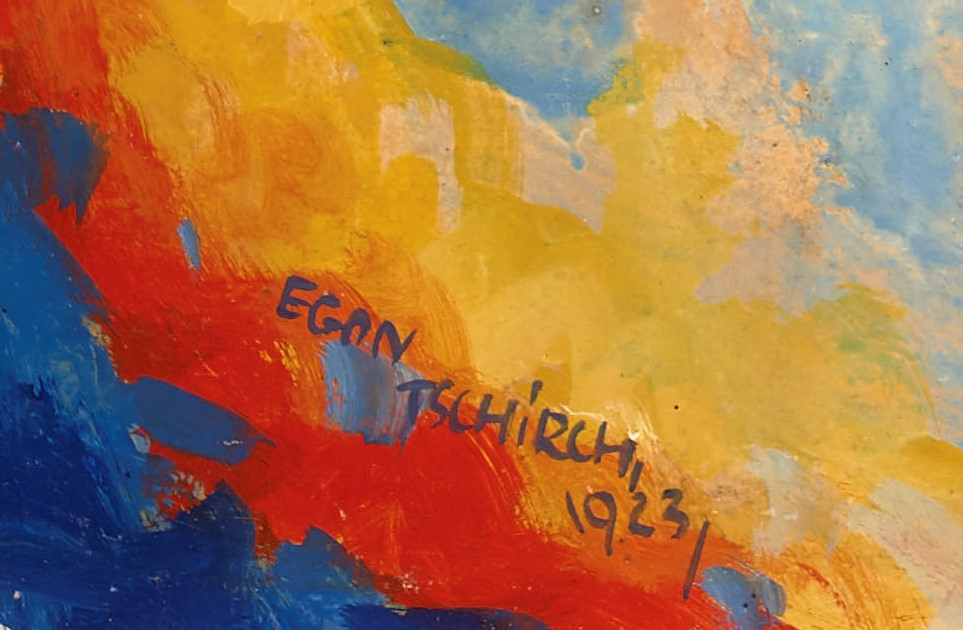
Signature (No. 10)

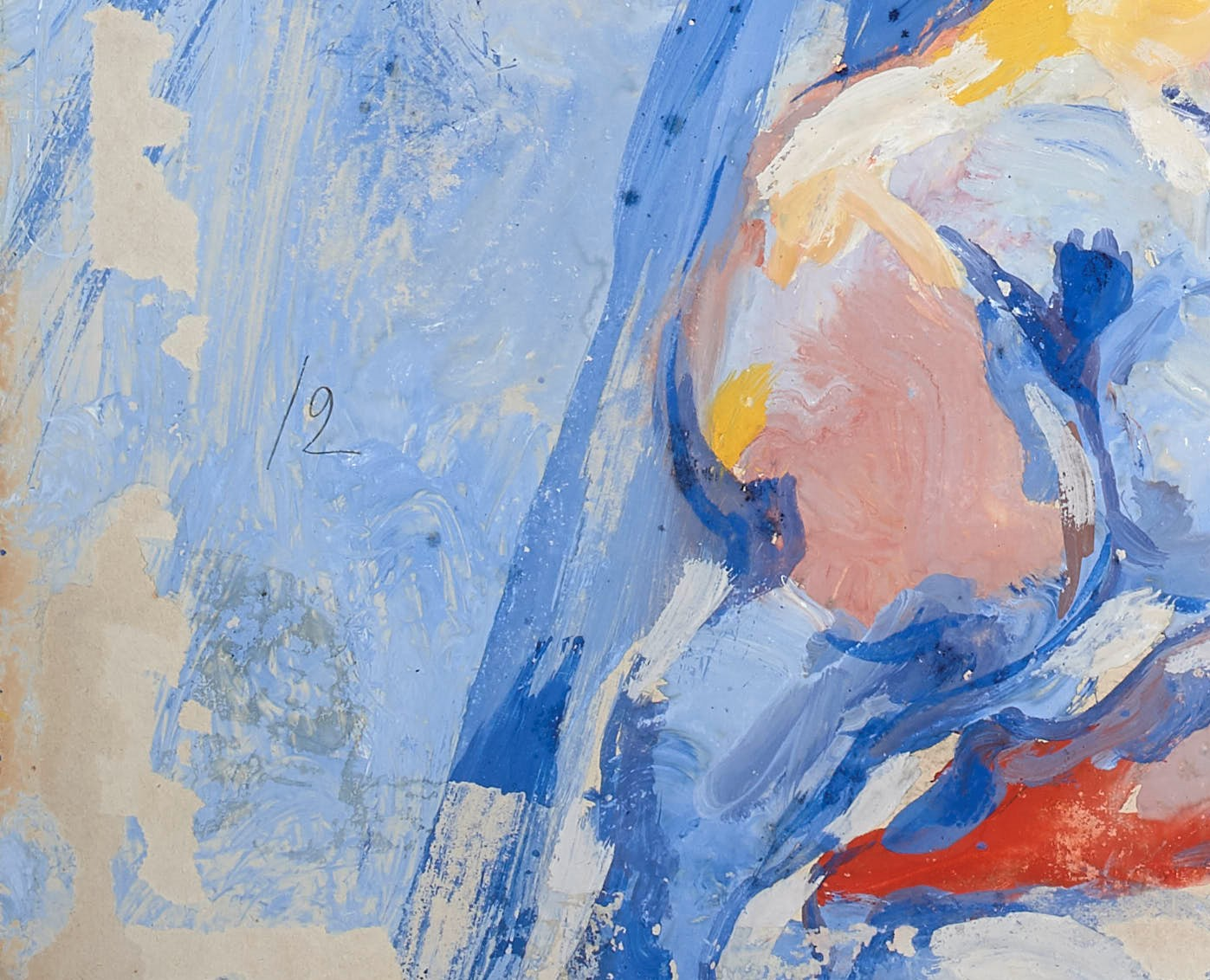
Numbering (No. 12)

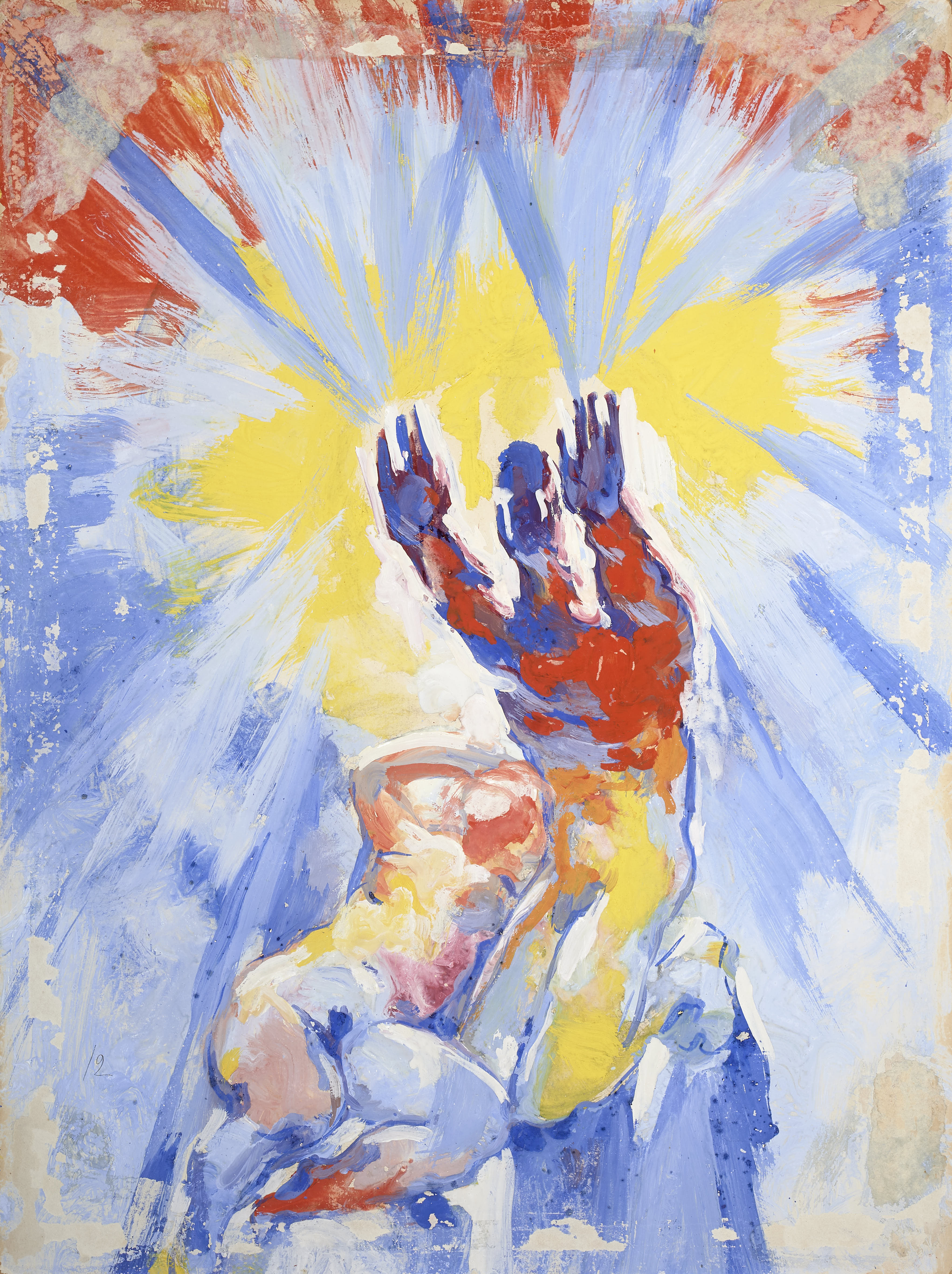
Painted back (study J on No. 12)

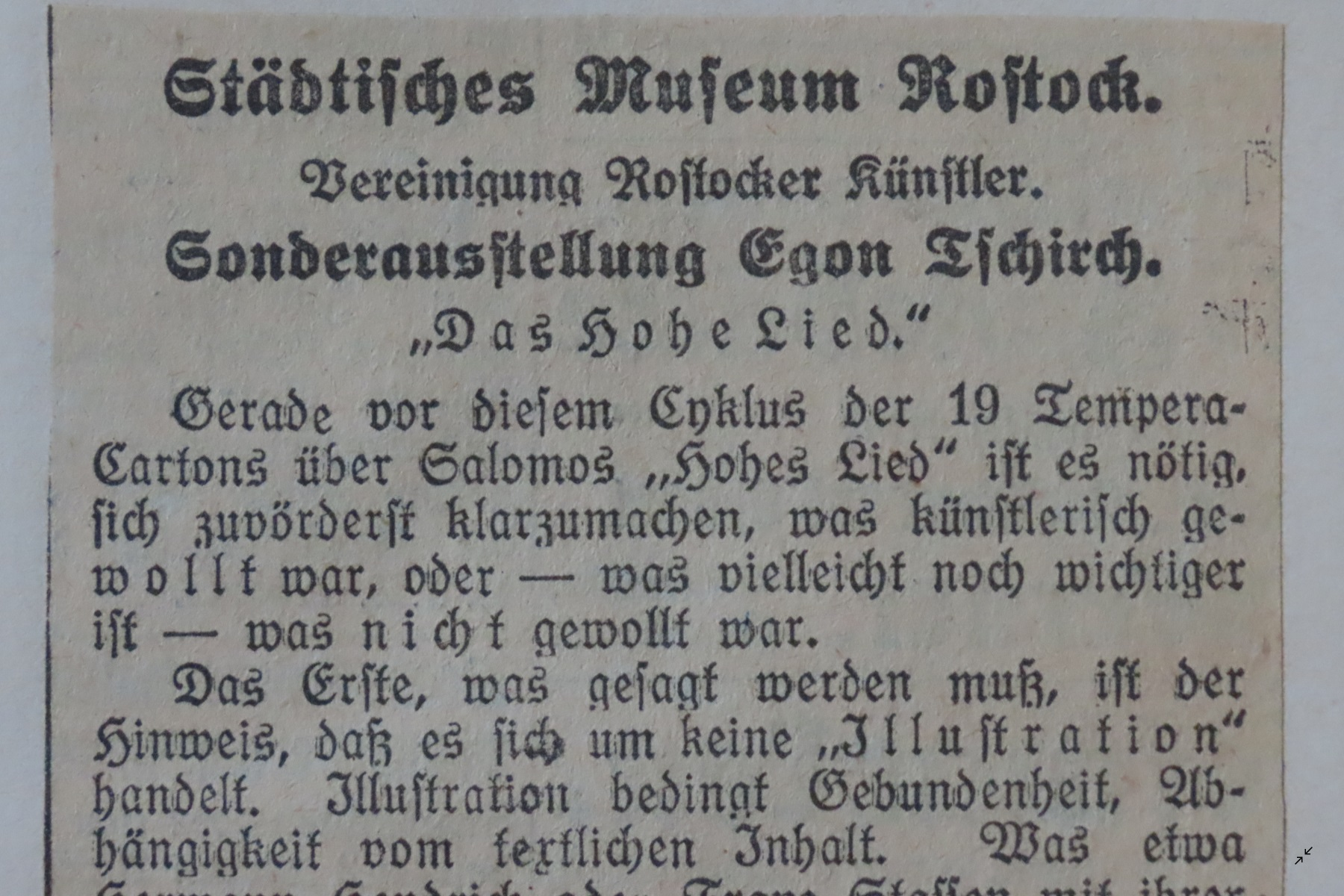
1923 Rostock. Museum of Art and Antiquity

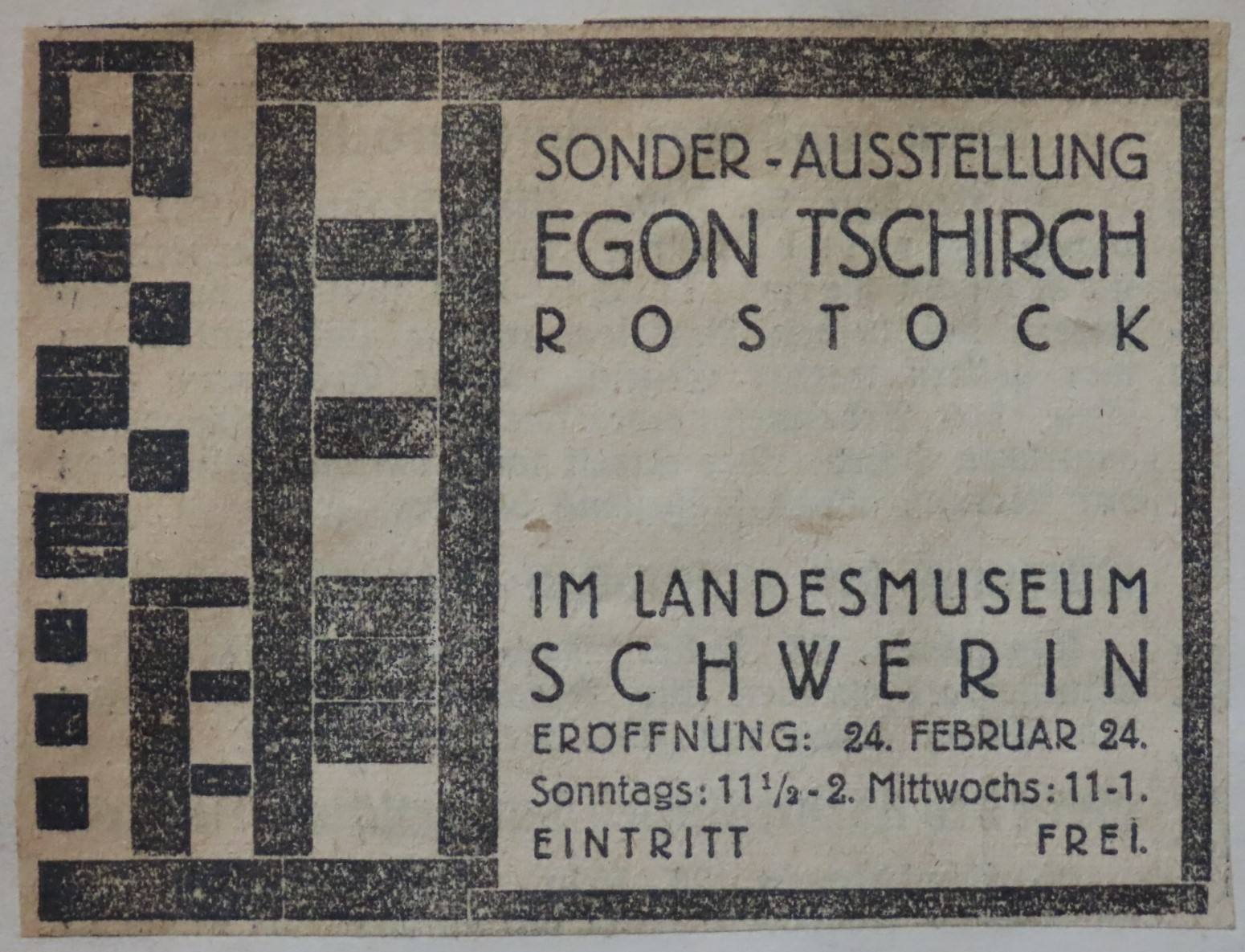
1924 Schwerin. State Museum

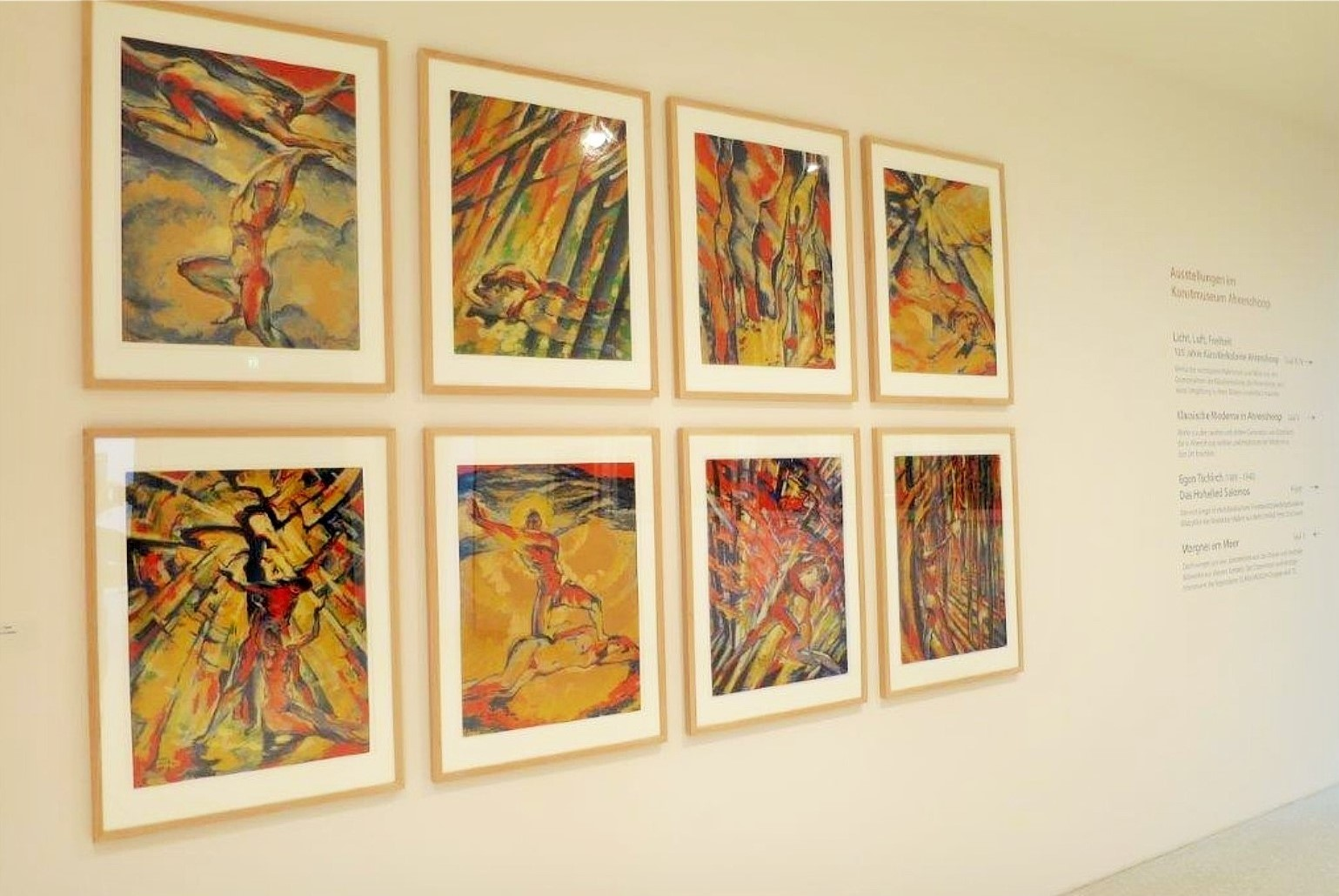
2017 Ahrenshoop. Museum of Art
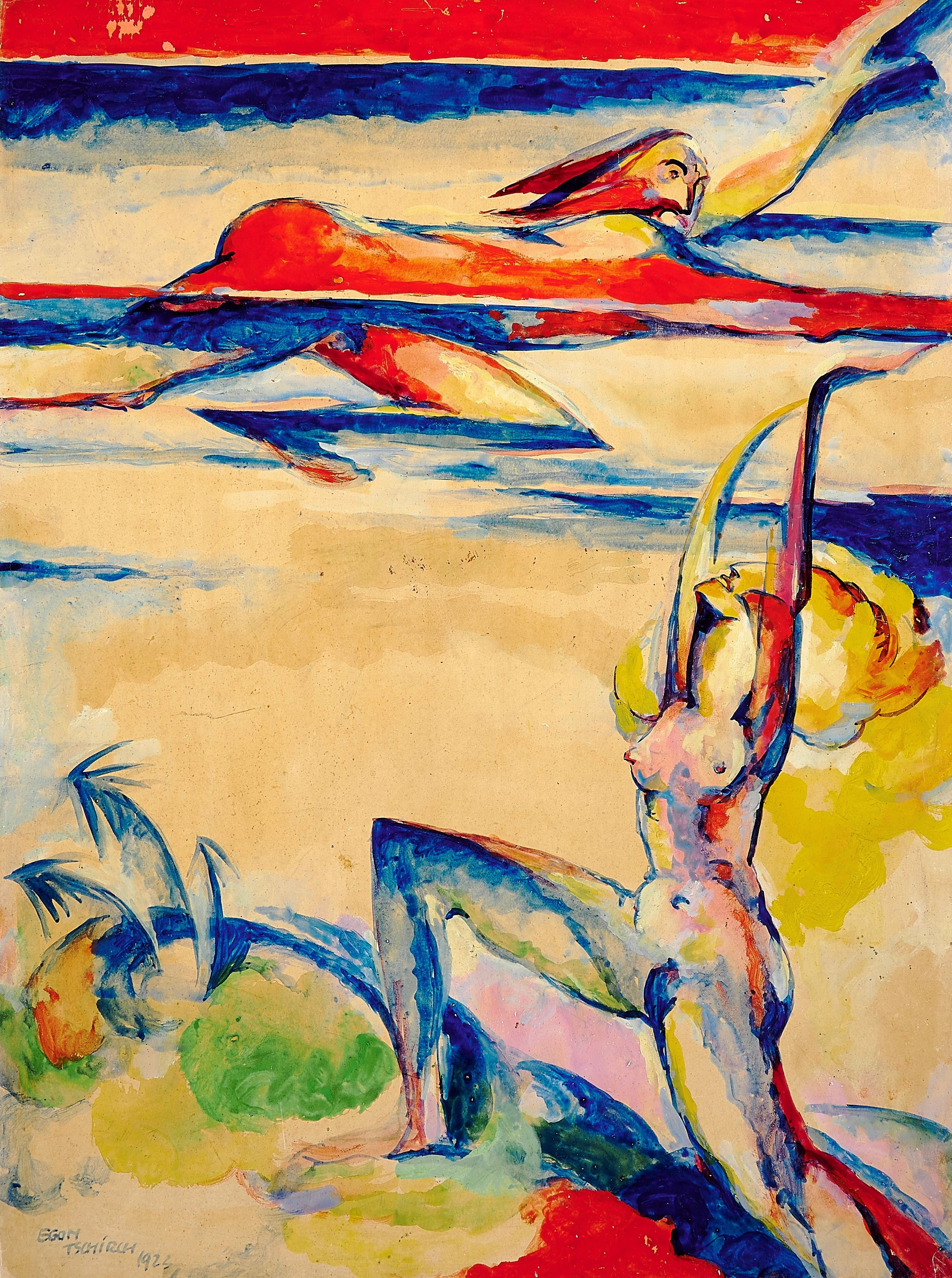
Study A

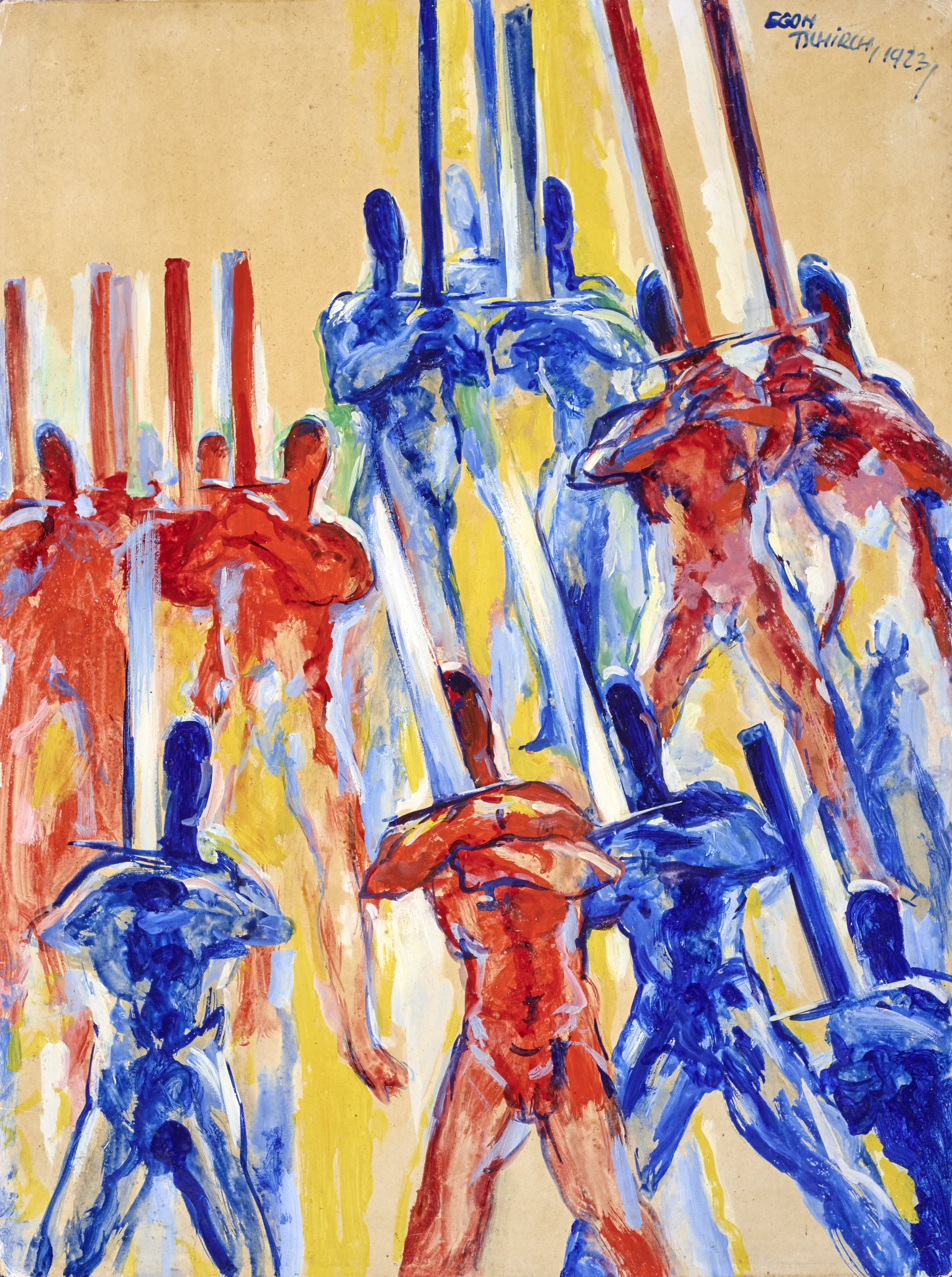
Study B

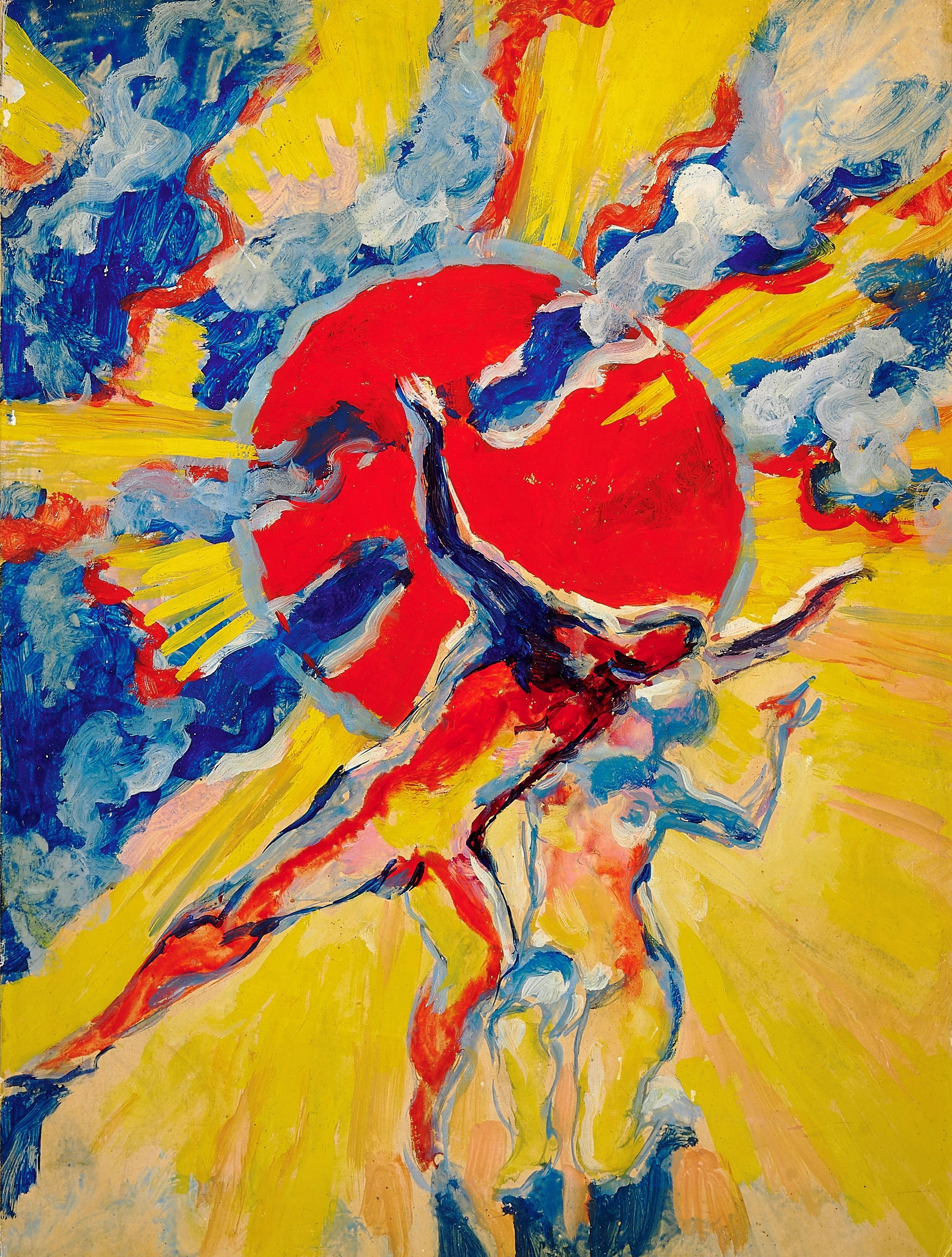
Study C

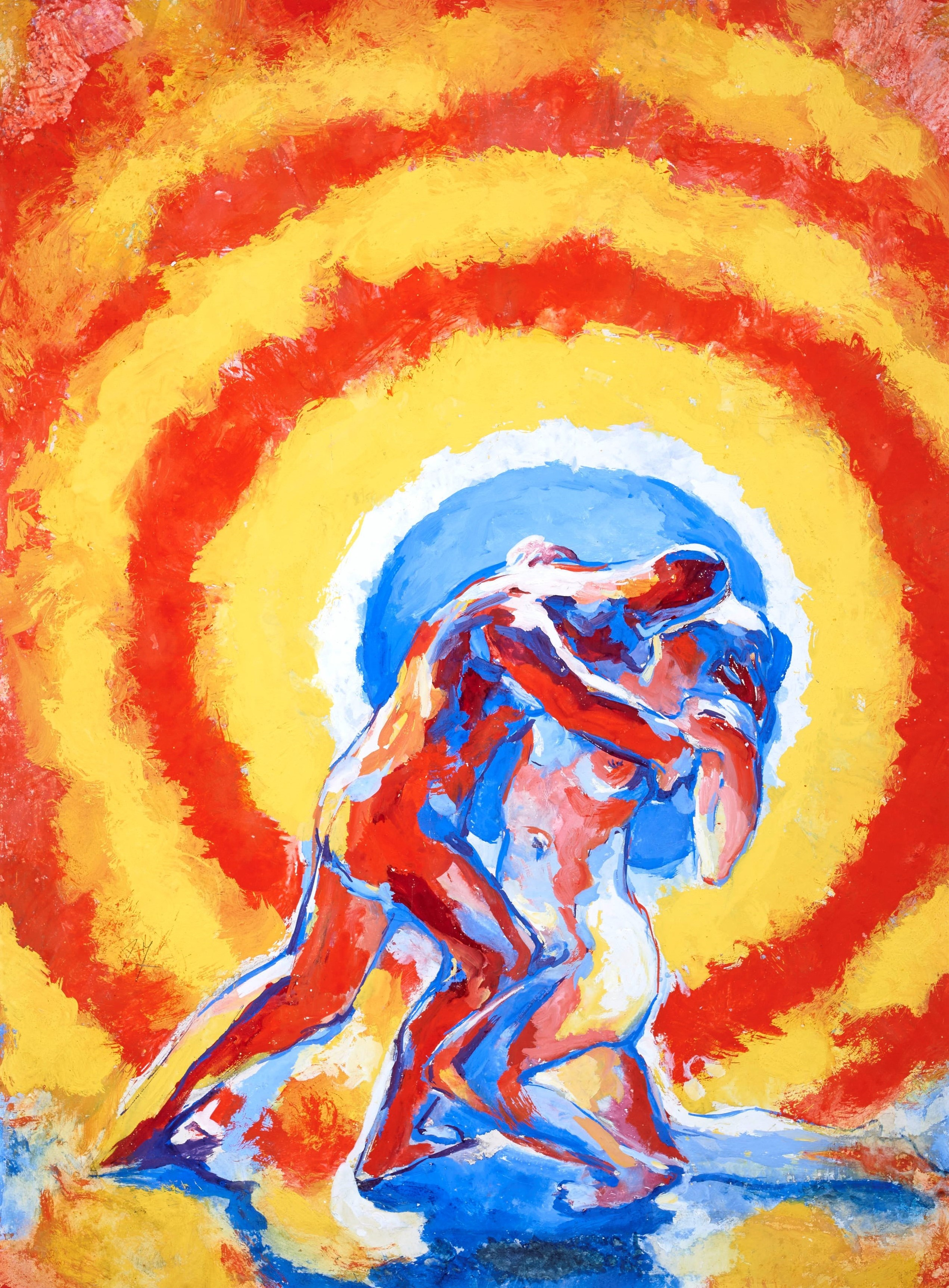
Study D

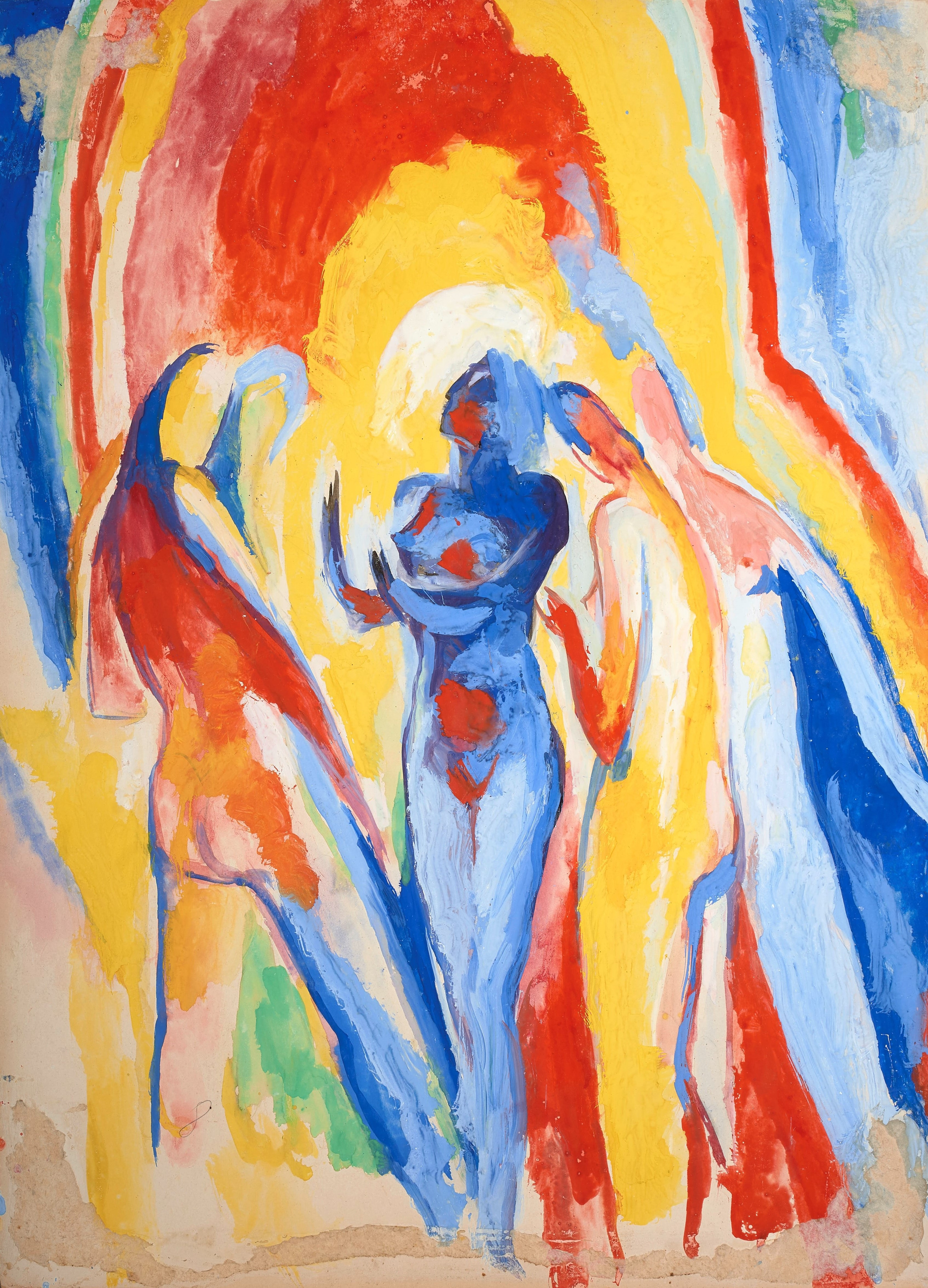
Study E

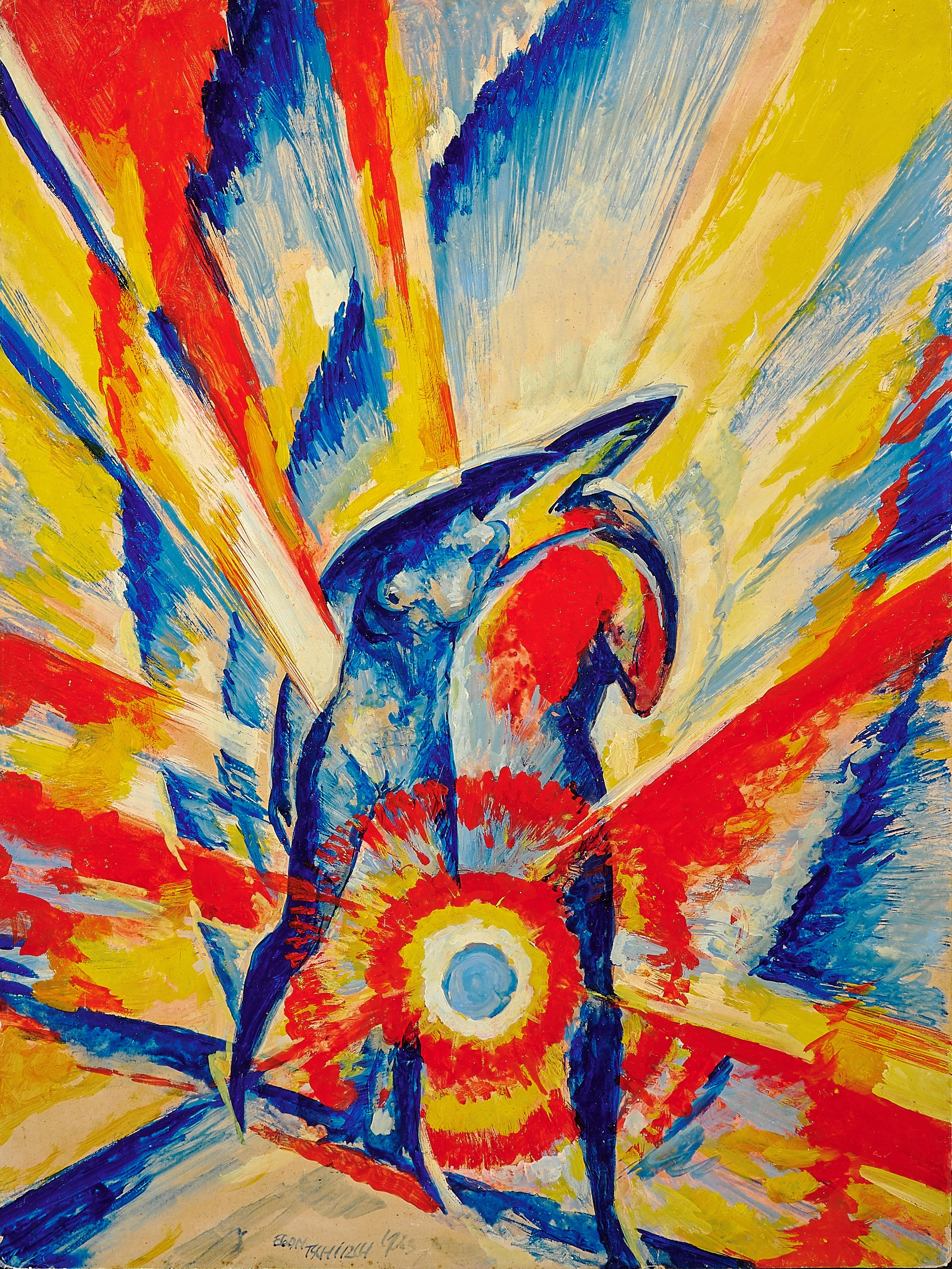
Study F

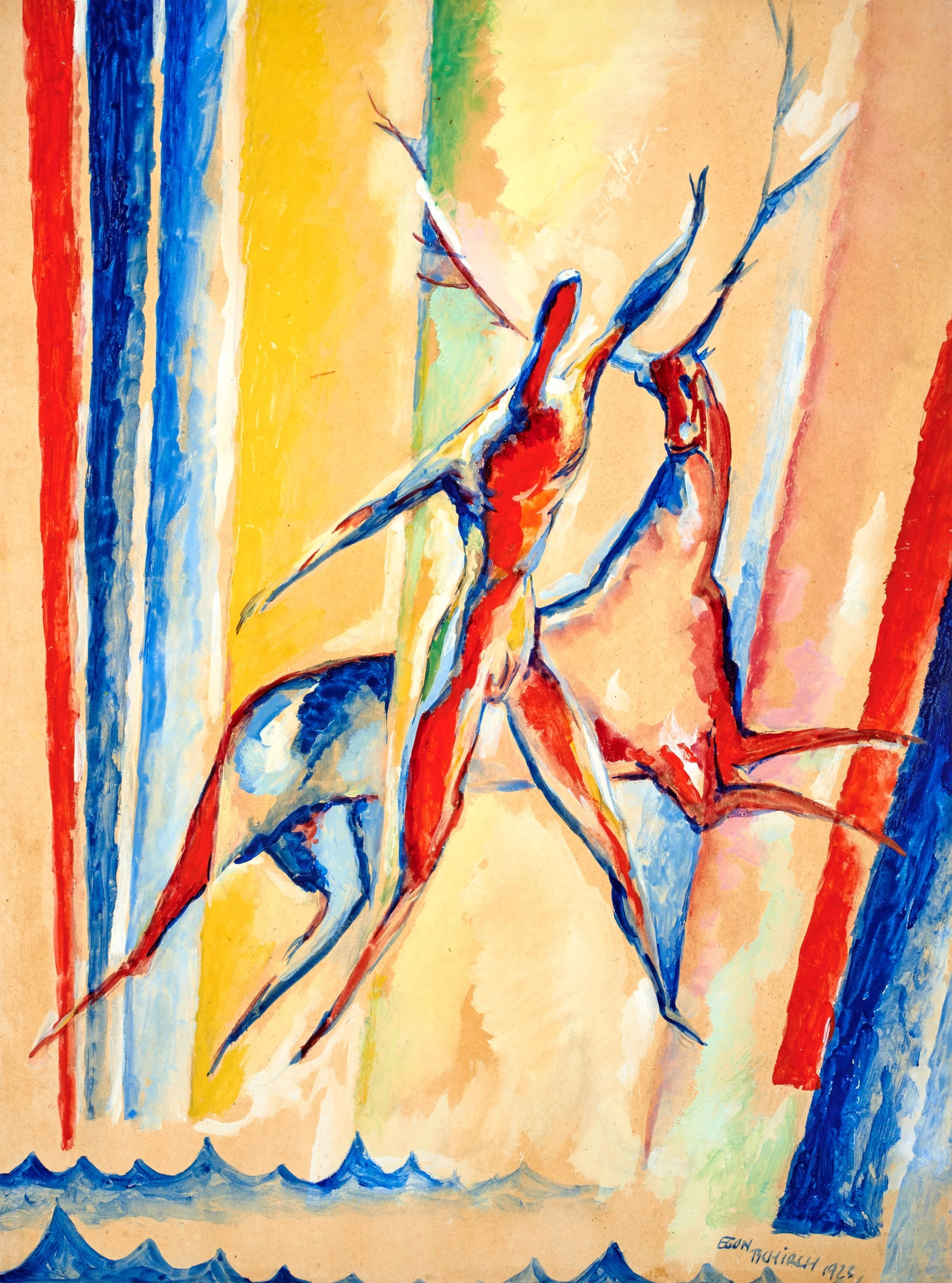
Study G

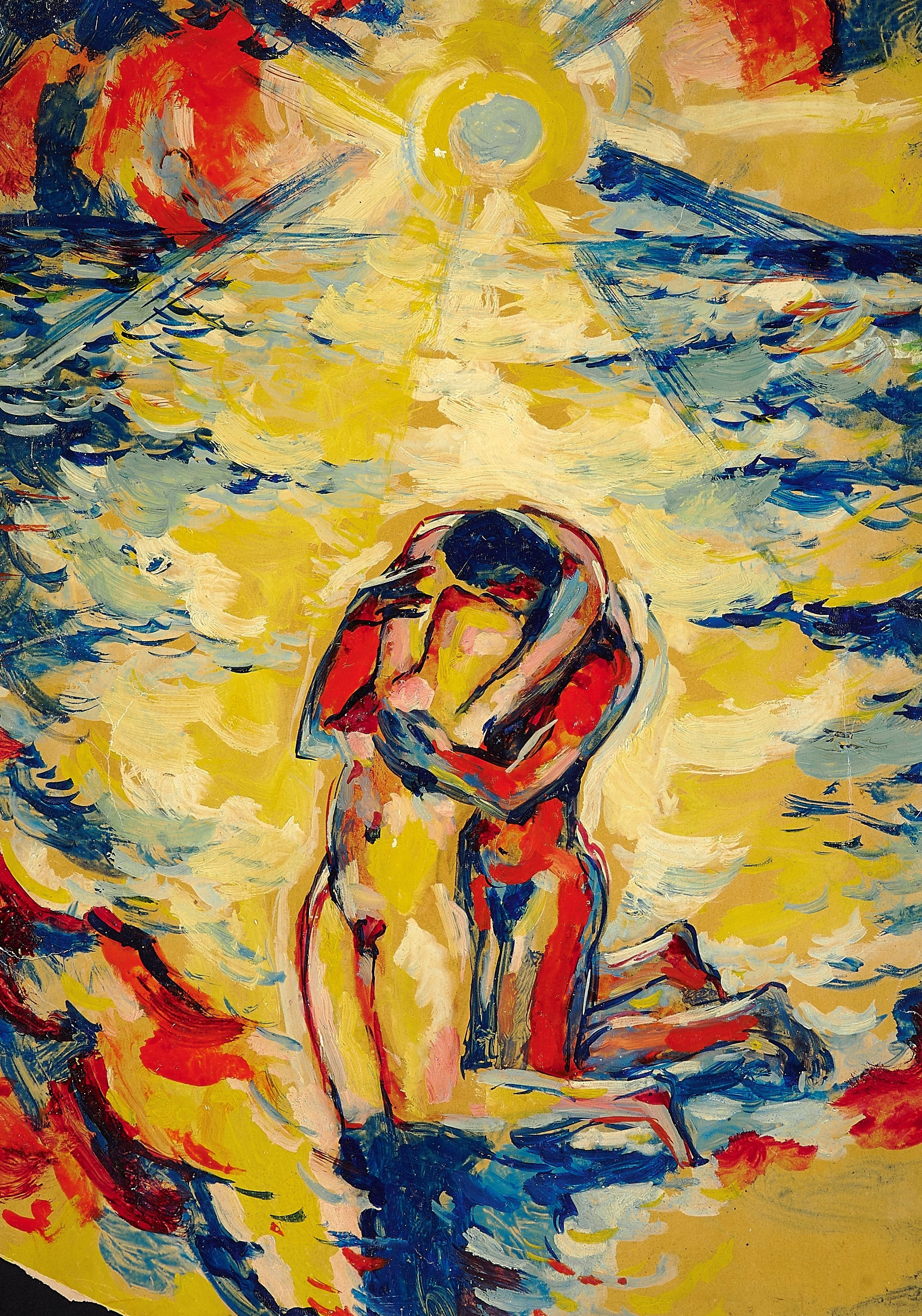
Study H

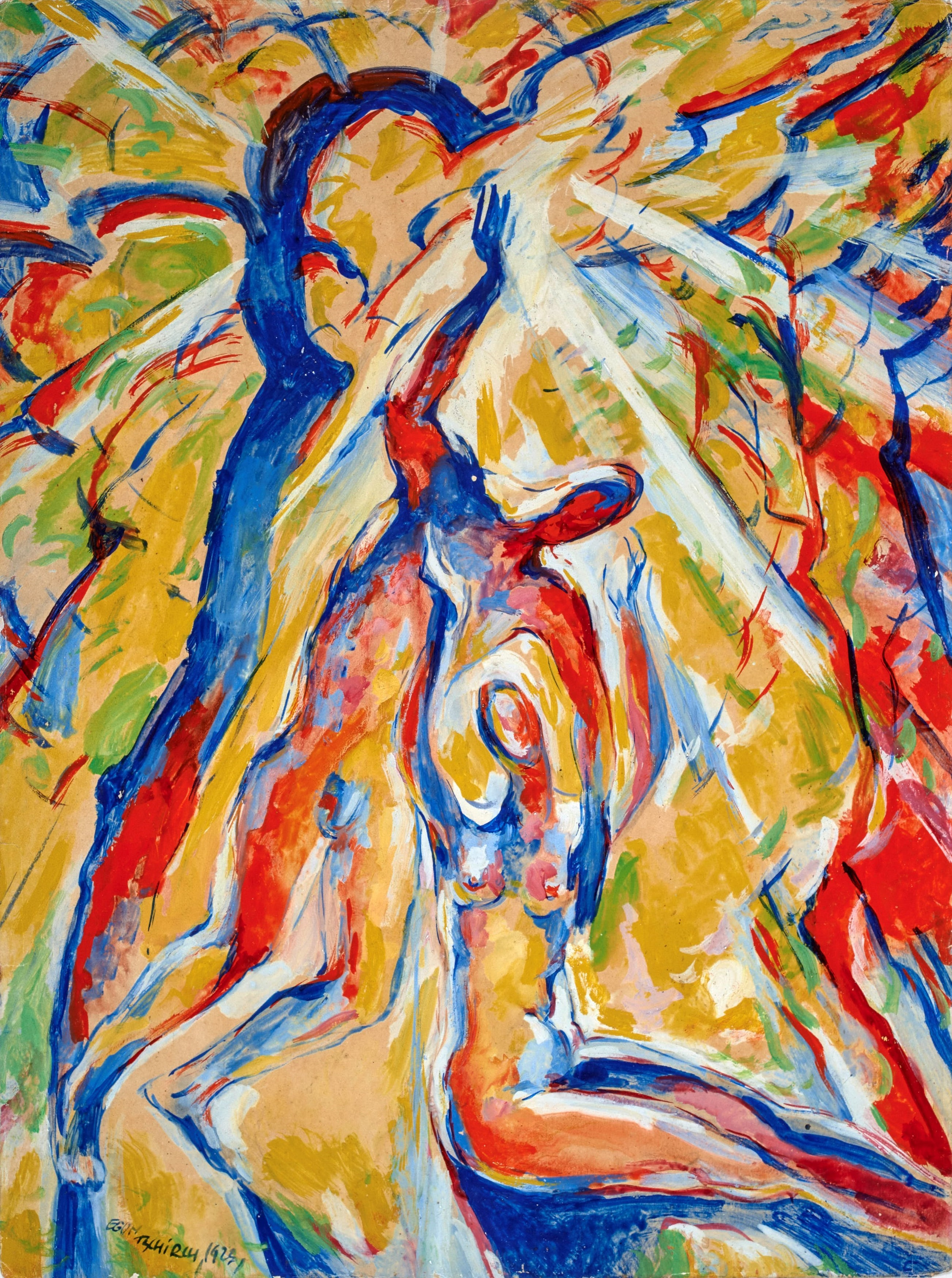
Study I

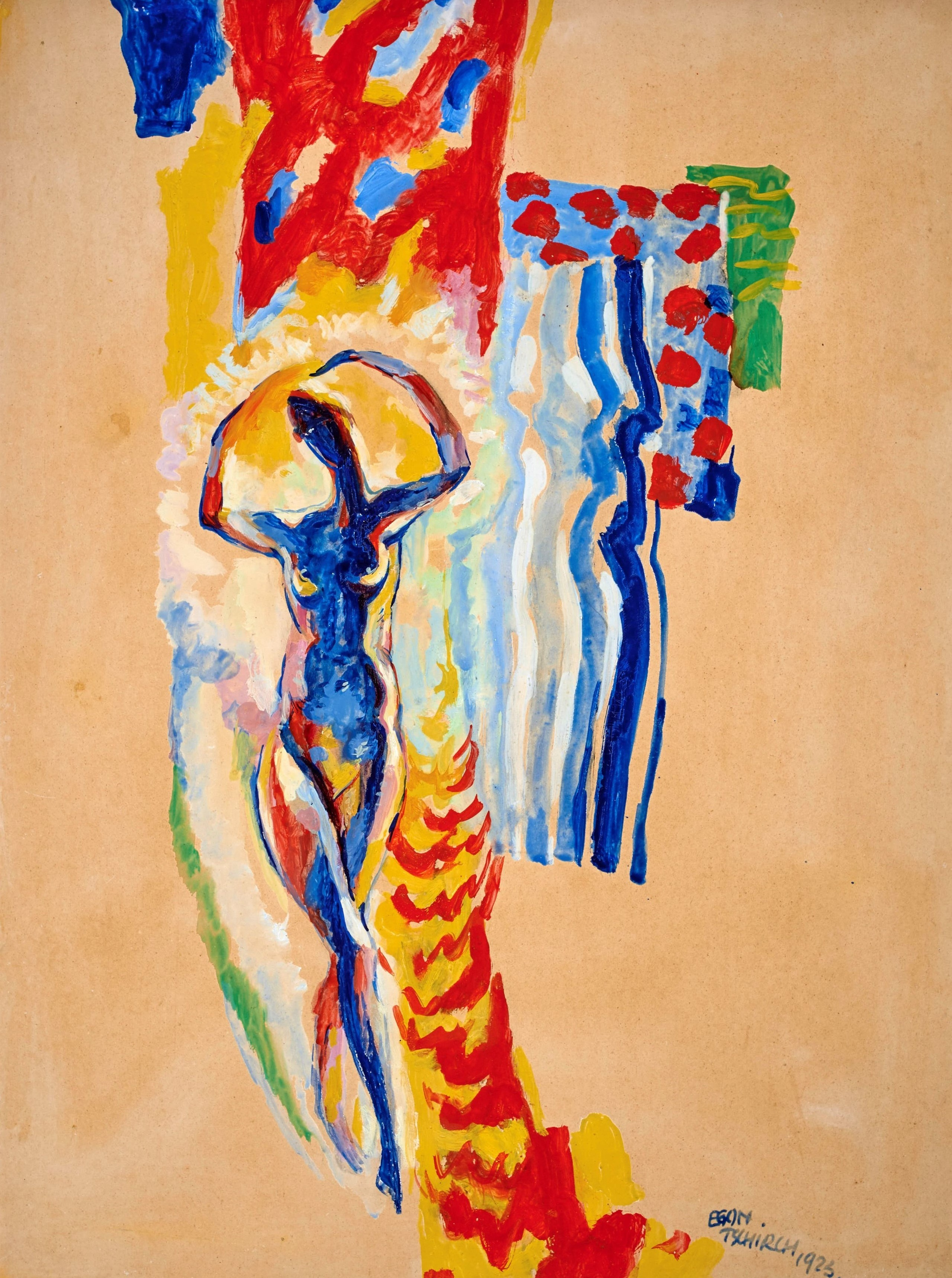
Study K

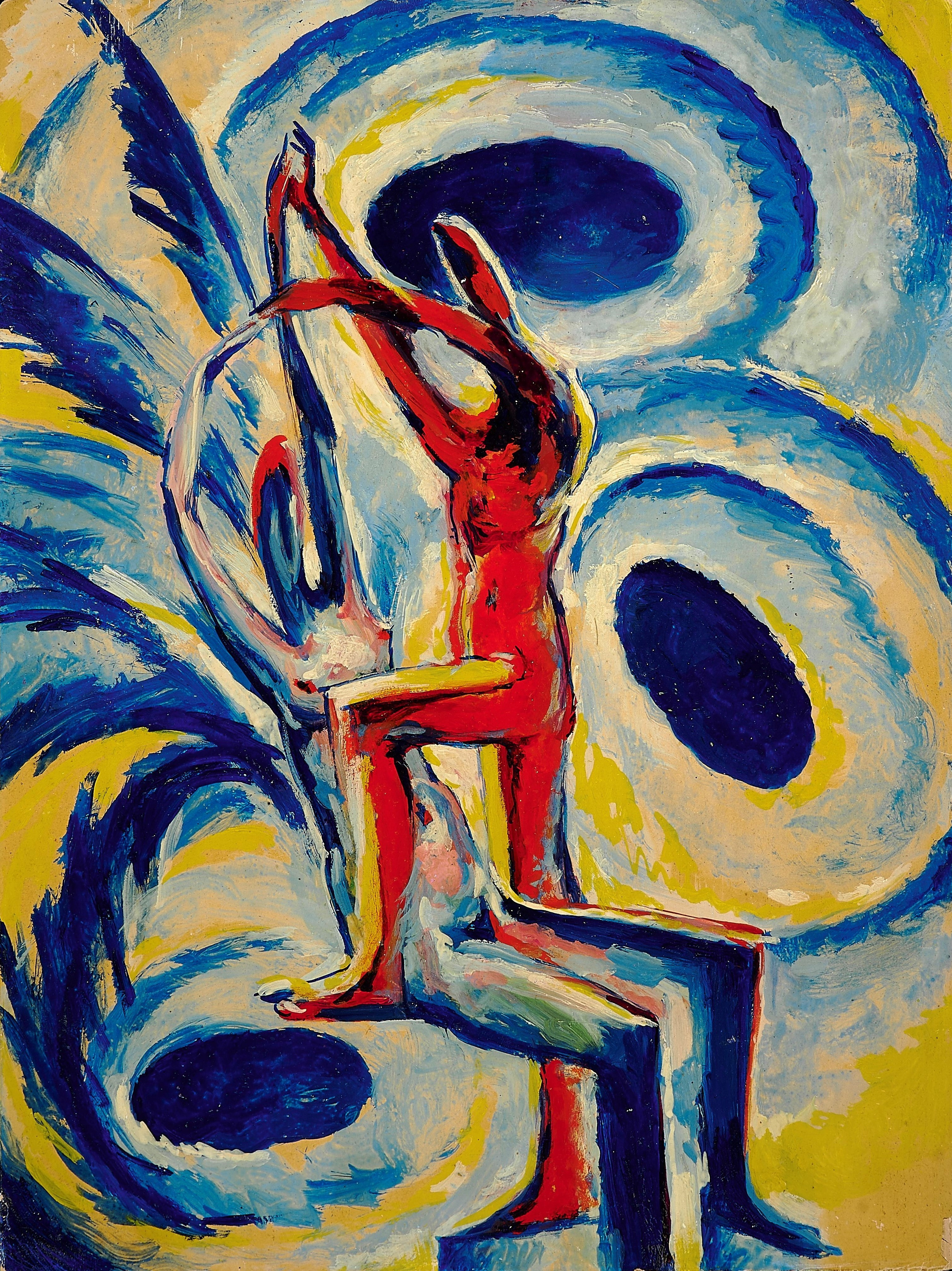
Study L

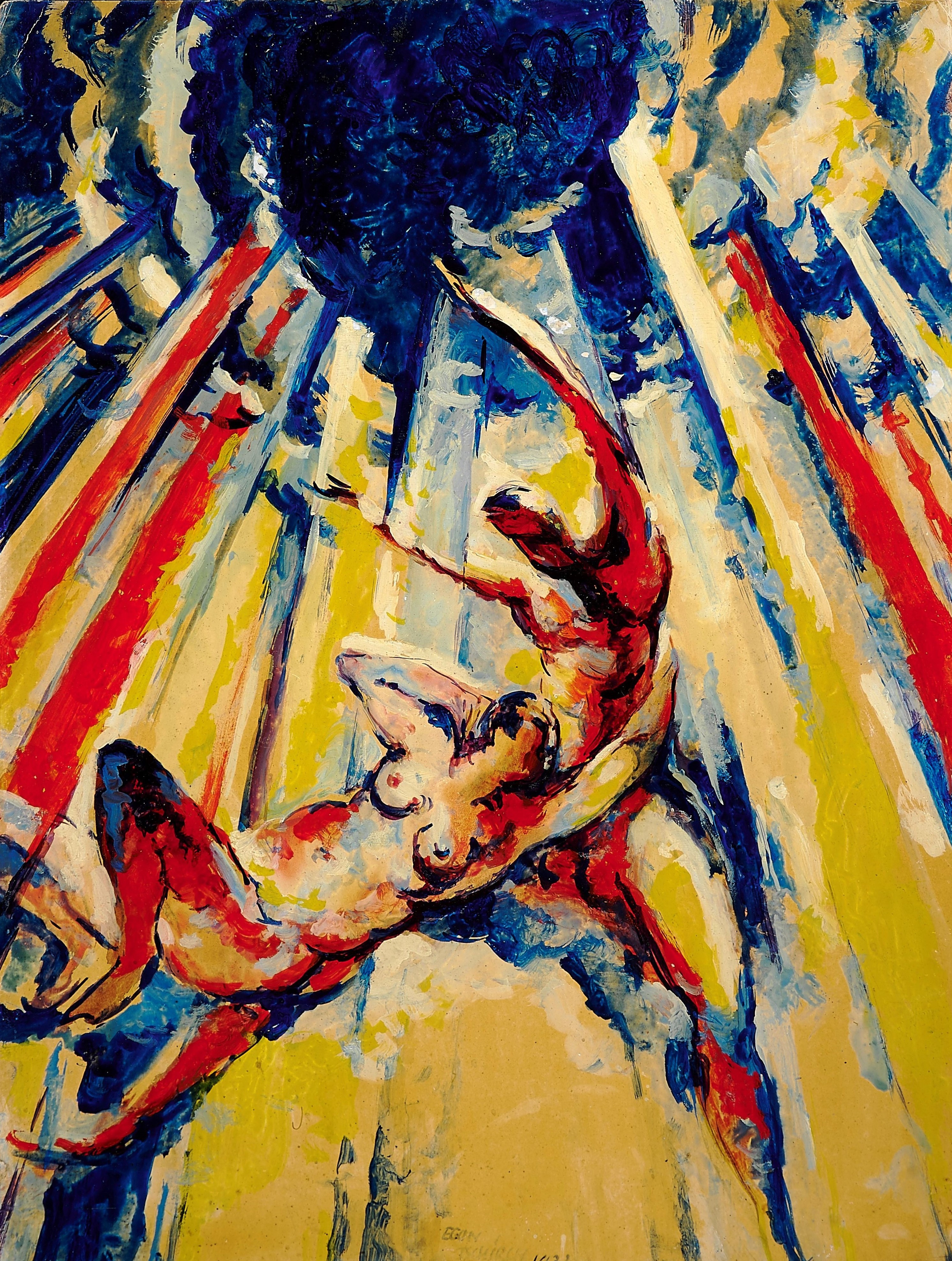
Study M

== See also ==
- Song of Songs

further picture cycles referring to Song of Songs:

- Lovis Corinth - coloured lithographs (1911)
- Ludwig von Hofmann - woodcuts (1921)
- Willy Jaeckel - etchings (1923)
- Marc Chagall - paintings (1957–1966)
- Salvador Dalí - coloured etchings (1971)
