= Timeline of Rostock =

The following is a timeline of the history of the city of Rostock, Germany.

== Prior to 18th century ==
- 1218 - Rostock granted Lübeck law city rights by Henry Borwin I, Lord of Mecklenburg.
- 1230 - Nikolaikirche (Rostock) (church) construction begins (approximate date).
- 1252 - Reference to predecessor church of St. Peter's Church.
- 1265
  - St. Mary's Church designated as the main parish church.
  - Rostock acquires Rostock Heath.
- 1270 - Abbey of the Holy Cross, Rostock founded.
- 1323 - Warnemünde becomes part of Rostock.
- 1358 - Hansetag (meeting of Hanseatic League) held in Rostock.
- 1362 - Hansetag held in Rostock.
- 1378 - Population: 10,785.^{(de)}
- 1380 - Public clock installed (approximate date).
- 1417 - Hansetag held in Rostock.
- 1419 - University of Rostock founded.
- 1569 - Universitätsbibliothek Rostock (library) founded.
- 1588 - Jakobikirche (Rostock) (church) built.
- 1677 - Rostock fire of 1677.
- 1695 - Rostock becomes part of the Duchy of Mecklenburg-Schwerin.

== 18th-19th centuries ==
- 1702 - Ducal palace built.
- 1712 - Rostock "taken by the Swedes."
- 1716 - Rostock "taken by the Russians."
- 1726 - Rostocker Rathaus (town hall) expanded.
- 1786 - Theatre built.
- 1788 - Municipal constitution effected.
- 1846 - Rostocker Zeitung (newspaper) in publication.
- 1880 - Population: 36,967.
- 1883 - Vereins für Rostocks Altertümer (history society) founded.
- 1890 - Neptun shipyard in business.
- 1893 - Ständehaus (estates hall) built.
- 1895 - Stadttheater Rostock opens
- 1897 - Rostocker Stadt- und Theaterorchester founded (now Norddeutsche Philharmonie Rostock)

== 20th century ==
- 1905 - Population: 60,790.
- 1913 - Dierkow becomes part of Rostock.^{(de)}
- 1919
  - Barnstorf, Bartelsdorf, Bramow, Brinckmansdorf, Dalwitzhof, Damerow, Kassebohm, and Riekdahl become part of Rostock.^{(de)}
  - Population: 67,953.
- 1922 - Heinkel aircraft manufactory in business.
- 1924 - Hinrichshagen, Markgrafenheide, Meyers Hausstelle, Schnatermann, Torfbrücke, Waldhaus, and Wiethagen become part of Rostock.^{(de)}
- 1934 - Diedrichshagen, Gehlsdorf, Groß Klein, Lütten Klein, Marienehe, Schmarl, and Schutow become part of Rostock.^{(de)}
- 1935 - Population: 104,585.^{(de)}
- 1942 - City bombed during World War II.
- 1949 - City becomes part of the German Democratic Republic.
- 1952 - City becomes seat of newly formed Bezirk Rostock district.
- 1953 - Uprising of 1953 in East Germany.
- 1954 - Ostseestadion built.
- 1955 - Population: 150,004.^{(de)}
- 1956 - Rostock Zoo opens.
- 1960
  - Rostock Port opens.
  - Hinrichsdorf and Nienhagen become part of Rostock.^{(de)}
- 1965 - F.C. Hansa Rostock (football club) formed.
- 1978 - Jürgeshof becomes part of Rostock.^{(de)}
- 1990 - City becomes part of the newly formed Mecklenburg-Vorpommern state in the reunited nation of Germany.
- 1992 - August: Anti-migrant Rostock-Lichtenhagen riots.
- 1994 - Rostock University of Music and Theatre established.
- 1995 - Vereins für Rostocker Geschichte (history society) founded.

== 21st century ==
- 2003 - National Bundesgartenschau (garden show) held in Rostock.
- 2005 - Roland Methling becomes mayor.
- 2010 - Population: 202,735.^{(de)}

== See also ==
- Rostock history
- History of Rostock
- List of mayors of Rostock
- List of monuments in Rostock
- Mecklenburg history (region) (de)
- List of cities in Mecklenburg-Vorpommern (state)
- Music in Rostock

== Bibliography ==
=== in English ===
- "Rostock". Handbook for North Germany. Murray's hand-book Rhine & North Germany (20th ed.). London: J. Murray. 1886. hdl:2027/hvd.hn1imr.
- "Rostock". Chambers's Encyclopaedia. London. 1901. hdl:2027/uc2.ark:/13960/t0ft8v96d.
- "Rostock", Northern Germany (15th ed.), Leipzig: Karl Baedeker, 1910, OCLC 78390379
- "Rostock" . Encyclopædia Britannica. Vol. 23 (11th ed.). 1910. p. 754.
- John M. Jeep, ed. (2001). "Rostock". Medieval Germany: an Encyclopedia. Garland Publishing. ISBN 0-8240-7644-3.
- Susan Mazur-Stommen (2008). "Evading what the Nazis left behind: an ethographic and phenomenological examination of historic preservation in postwar Rostock". In Gavriel David Rosenfeld; Paul B. Jaskot (eds.). Beyond Berlin: Twelve German Cities Confront the Nazi Past. USA: University of Michigan Press. ISBN 978-0-472-11611-9 – via HathiTrust. (fulltext)

=== in German ===
- Werner Reinhold (1911) [1836]. Chronik der Stadt Rostock (in German). H. Urban.
- Karl Koppmann (1887). Geschichte der Stadt Rostock (in German). Wilh. Werthers Verlag.
- Beiträge zur Geschichte der Stadt Rostock (in German), Verein für Rostocks Altertümer, 1981 1890-
- "Rostock". Brockhaus' Konversations-Lexikon (in German). Vol. 13 (14th ed.). Leipzig: Brockhaus. 1896. hdl:2027/njp.32101064064502.
- Wilhelm Schacht (1908). Zur geschichte des Rostocker theaters (1756-1791) (in German). Universität Rostock. (dissertation)
- Mecklenburg. Griebens Reiseführer (in German). 1919.
- Friedhilde Krause; Gerhard Heitz, eds. (1996). "Rostock". Mecklenburg-Vorpommern und Brandenburg (in German). Vol. 16. Georg Olms Verlag. ISBN 978-3-487-41683-0.
- Gerhard Köbler (2007). "Rostock". Historisches Lexikon der Deutschen Länder (in German) (7th ed.). Munich: C.H. Beck. p. 580. ISBN 978-3-406-54986-1.
