= Dörte Helm =

German Bauhaus artist, painter and graphic designer (1898–1941)

Dorothea "Dörte" Helm
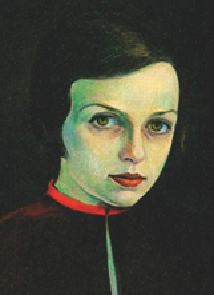
- Self-portrait
- Born: 3 December 1898; Berlin-Wilmersdorf, German Empire
- Died: 24 February 1941 (aged 42); Hamburg, Germany
- Other names: Dörte Helm-Heise
- Education: Kunsthochschule Kassel, Grand-Ducal Saxon Art School, Weimar, Bauhaus
- Occupations: Bauhaus artist, painter and graphic designer
- Spouse: Heinrich Heise
- Parent(s): Rudolf Helm, Alice Caroline, b. Bauer
- Website: https://www.doerte-helm.de

Dorothea "Dörte" Helm, also Dörte Helm-Heise (3 December 1898 – 24 February 1941) was a German Bauhaus artist, painter and graphic designer.

== Life ==
Dörte Helm was a daughter of the classical philologist Rudolf Helm (1872–1966) and his Jewish wife Alice Caroline, b. Bauer (1873–1947). After completing her education at the Urban girls school in Berlin-Steglitz, the family followed her father to Rostock in 1910, who had held a professorship at the University of Rostock since 1907. Dörte Helm attended here until 1913 the Lyceum and then for two years the School of Applied Arts. From 1915 to 1918 three years followed at the Kunsthochschule Kassel, among others in the modeling class of de:Carl Hans Bernewitz and as a student of de:Ernst Odefey, she also gave drawing lessons in a daughter's home.

Helm studied 1918/1919 at the Academy of Fine Arts in Weimar in the graphics class with Walther Klemm. 1919 followed the change to the State Bauhaus Weimar as an apprentice in the mural and textile workshop. Her teachers were Johannes Itten, Lyonel Feininger, Oskar Schlemmer, Georg Muche and Bauhaus founder Walter Gropius. In 1922 she passed the journeyman's examination as a decorative painter in front of the Weimar Chamber of Crafts. Already in 1921 she was involved in the project de:Haus Sommerfeld from Gropius, she made an application curtain and worked as a consultant in the interior design. 1922/1923 she worked in the weaving workshop and in 1923 in the exhibition commission for the Bauhaus exhibition, to which she contributed a four-part textile screen and a geometric wall hanging.

Until 1924 she remained as a journeyman at the Bauhaus and then returned to Rostock. Here she became a member of the Rostock Artists Association (Vereinigung Rostocker Künstler) and the Economic Association of Visual Artists (Wirtschaftlicher Verband Bildender Künstler). It was followed by extended stays in Ahrenshoop, where she made the acquaintance of the publisher de:Peter E. Erichson. Travels took her to Austria and Switzerland (1928). From 1925 to 1931 she regularly participated in the exhibitions of the Rostock Artists Association; She had her first exhibition in Rostock already in 1920. In 1927, the Barlach-friend de:Friedrich Schult organized an exhibition at the Güstrow Museum. In 1927/1928 she was commissioned by the architect de:Walter Butzek with the interior design of the Kurhaus Warnemünde. The murals she made there were destroyed after 1933.

In 1930 she married the journalist Heinrich Heise (1899–1944) and moved to Hamburg-Fuhlsbüttel. Her husband worked from 1933 as editor of the Hamburg program guide Funkwacht. From 1933 she was banned from working by the Reich Chamber of Culture Act due to "Half-Jewish" status, but continued with literary work (sometimes under a pseudonym). In February 1941 she died of an infectious disease. The funeral oration was held by the journalist Hugo Sieker and published as an obituary in the Hamburg Gazette of 1./2. March 1941.

== Gallery ==
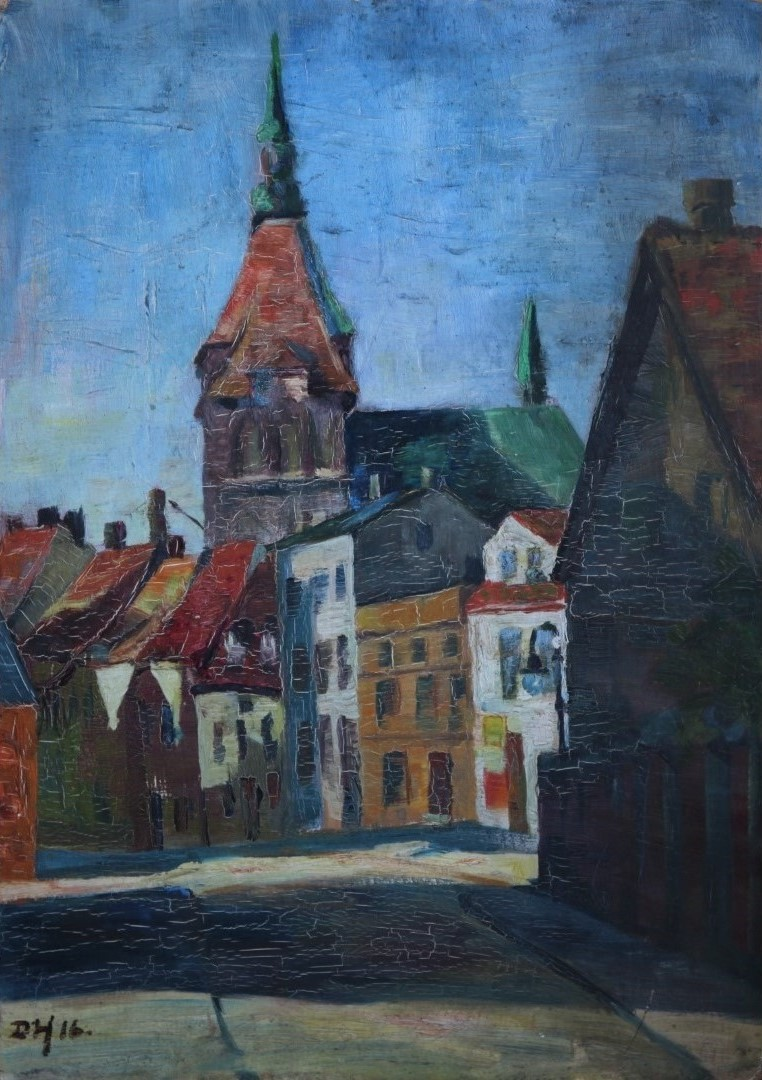
View of St. Mary's Church, Rostock (1916)

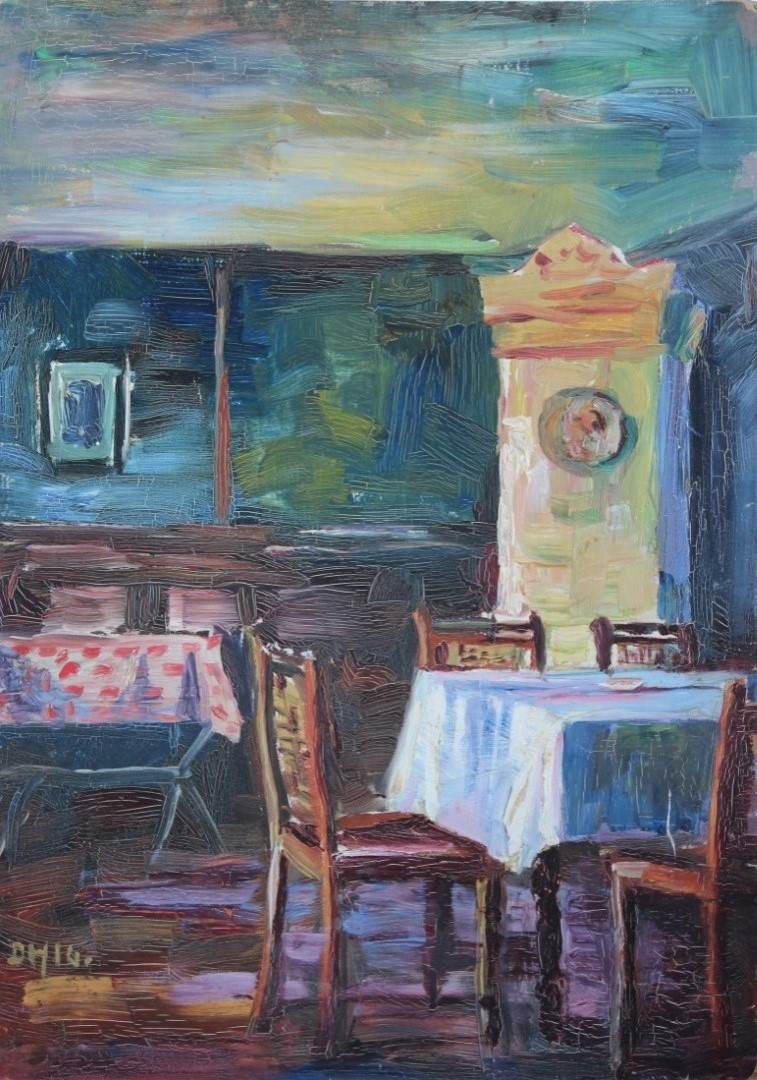
Interieur (1916)

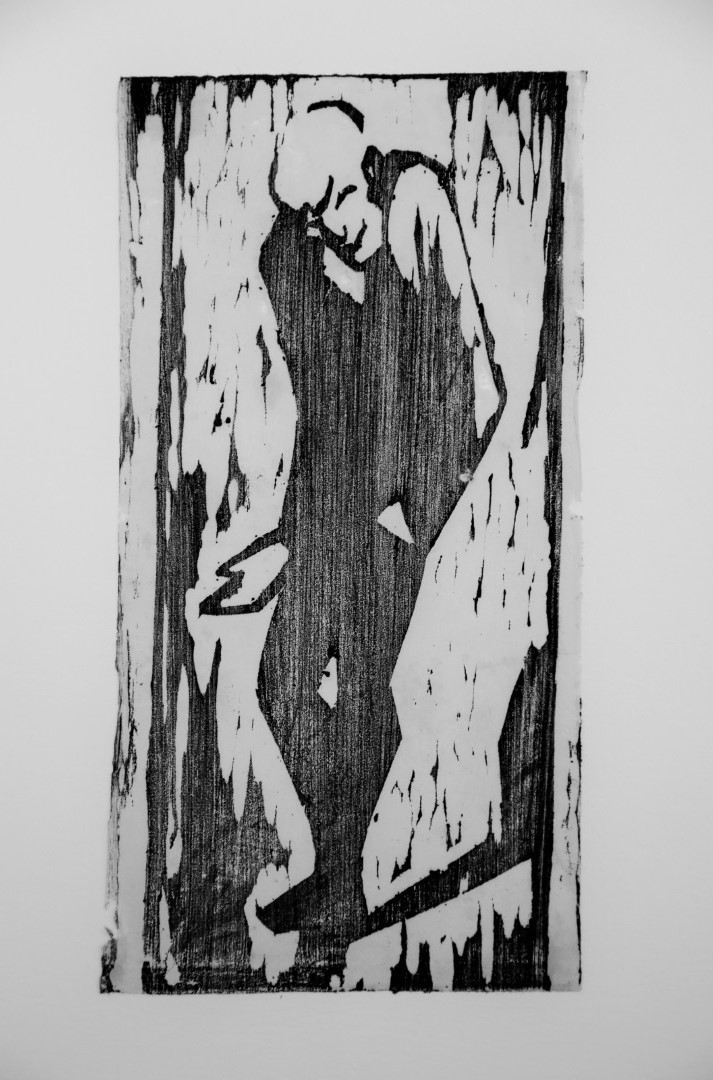
Standing Man (1919)

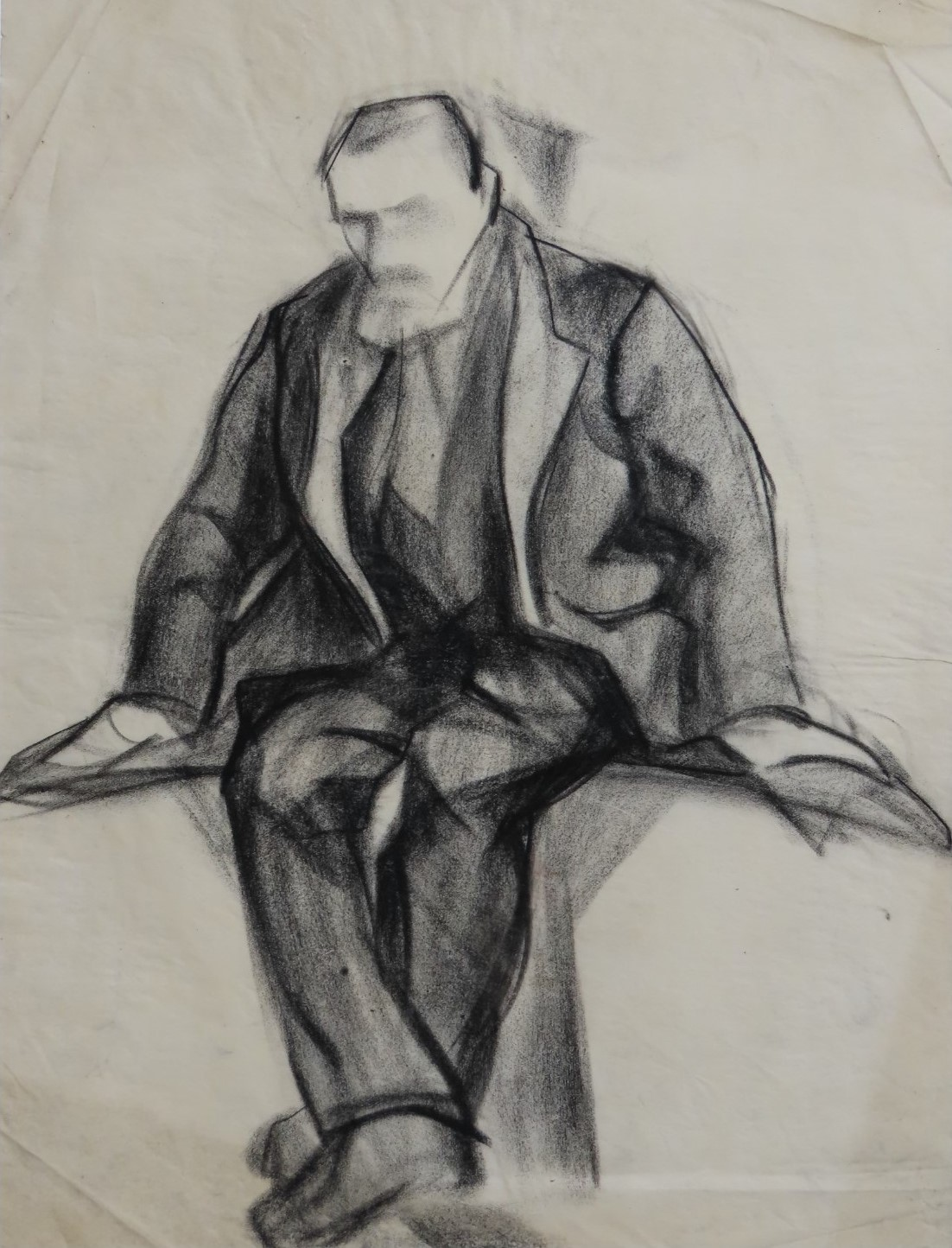
Sitting Man (1919)

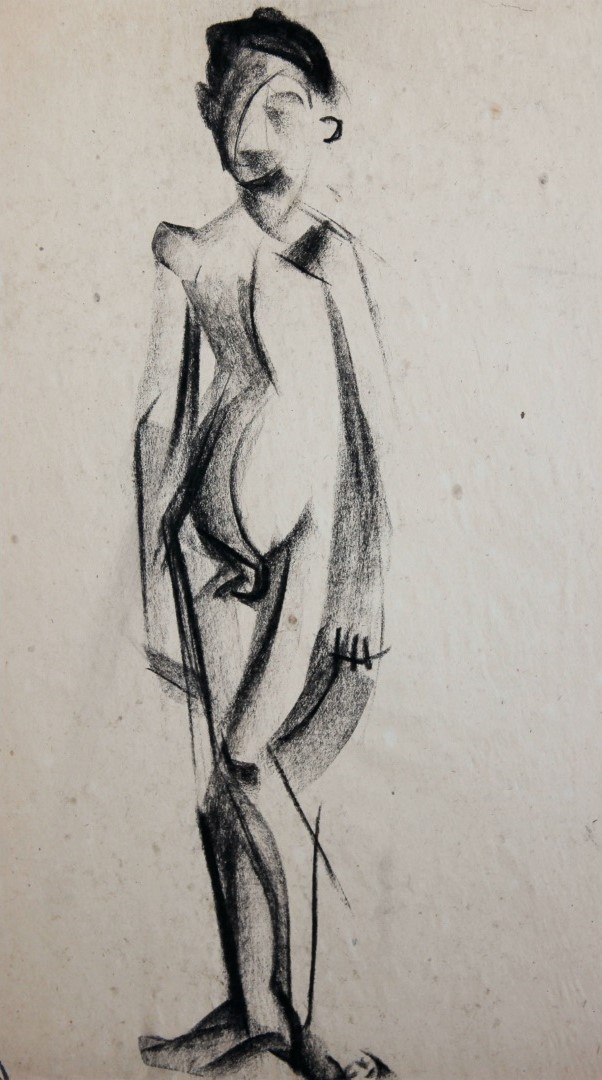
Male Nude (1919)

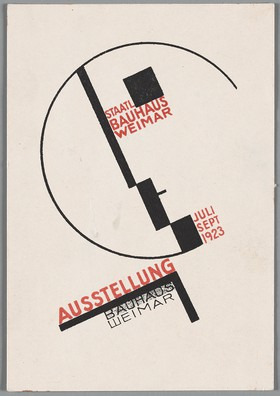
Bauhaus exhibition, postcard 14 (1923)

== Works ==
Dörte Helm's oeuvre includes drawings, woodcuts, paintings, tapestries and woodwork.

- Drafts of a service stamp (Signet) of the State Bauhaus (in a tender with a 3rd Prize considered)
- Postcard 14 to the Bauhaus exhibition 1923. Museum of Modern Art and Harvard Art Museums
- Stained Glass Window in Peter E. Erichson's Summer House in 10 Schifferberg, Ahrenshoop (built in 1897 by Friedrich Wachenhusen) 1926/1927
- Portrait G. D. in front of northern landscape. (Bildnis G. D. vor nördlicher Landschaft) Art Museum Ahrenshoop
- Farmhouses by the water. (Bauernhäuser am Wasser) 1925, Kunstmuseum Ahrenshoop
- Portrait L.R. (Line Ristow). 1927, Pastel (Line Ristow was the partner of Peter E. Erichson)
- Self-portrait. 1931
- Yellow daffodils. (Gelbe Narzissen)
- Fishing nets. (Fischernetze)
- The puppeteer from Kiel. (De Poppenspäler ut Kiel) title in Low German
- The flying room. (Das fliegende Zimmer)
- The slipping room. (Das abrutschende Zimmer)
- In the fairytale kingdom. (Im Märchenreich) (1921, children's book with verses of her father)
- King Drosselbart. Fairy Game. (Listed at the Stadttheater Rostock in 1931, with her own stage design)

== Legacy ==
One hundred years after the founding of the Bauhaus, the German six-part television series Die Neue Zeit was created in 2019 under the direction of Lars Kraume, in which Dörte Helm, played by Anna Maria Mühe, was interspersed with many fictional elements. This series also relates the intimate relationship that Walter Gropius and Dörte Helm would have had in Weimar. Her daughter, Cornelia Heise, says in an interview that this relationship has not been proven.

== See also ==
- Women of the Bauhaus
