= Music in Rostock =

History of music in Rostock, Germany

The largest city in Mecklenburg-Vorpommern, Rostock is an important cultural center in Northern Germany. Records of the history of music in Rostock stretch back to the 13th century.

== Medieval and Renaissance periods ==
The earliest known records of musical activity in Rostock date to the late 13th century. There are records of the instrumentalists, Herbordus ‘timponator’ (1287), Stacius ‘basunre’ (1288), and Johannes ‘lireman’ (1288) serving in the capacity of civic musicians. Many of 14th and 15th century records have survived listing the names of town musicians, minstrels, and organists. In the 15th century, the town had music posts for 'fistulatores', 'piper', and 'bassuner'. A fourth position, 'kunstspielleute', was added in the 16th century.

The University of Rostock was established in 1419; one of the oldest universities in Northern Europe. This is where the Rostocker Liederbuch, a collection of 51 late medieval songs in German and Latin, was compiled from 1465-1487. The University library also houses the extensive music library compiled by John Albert I, Duke of Mecklenburg in the 16th century, and later acquired another great historic music library from the Duchess Louise Frederica of Württemberg upon her death in 1791.

The 16th-century Protestant Reformer and clergyman Joachim Slüter published the first hymn books in Low German in Rostock in 1525 and 1531.

== Baroque period ==
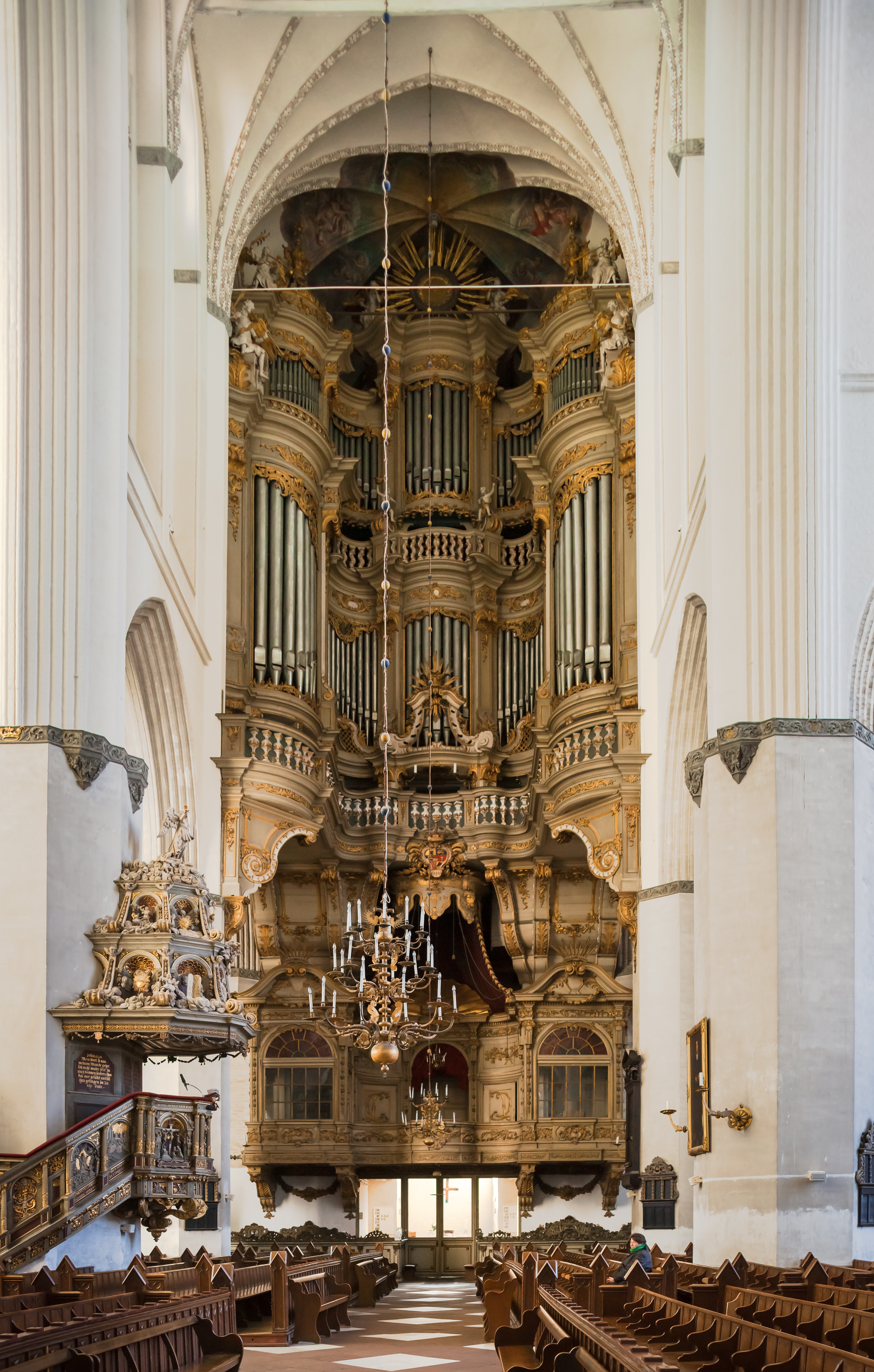
The organ at St. Mary's Church, Rostock

In 1623 the Rostock city council appointed Balthasar Kirchhof as the first director of instrumental music. Composer and music theorist Joachim Burmeister (1564-1629) was educated at Rostock University. He later taught at the Rostock town school while also serving as a cantor at the St. Mary's Church, Rostock from 1589-1593. He was then a Magister and cantor at St. Nicholas Church, Rostock from 1593-1629. Burmeister published three important treatises on music theory and composition in addition to authoring numerous hymns and a few motets. His writing employed a rhetorical doctrine to music, and his conception of musical syntax and grammar were revolutionary ideas for his time.

Daniel Friderici (1584–1638) was the most important Baroque music composer in the city of Rostock. A native of Eichstedt, Friderici first came to Rostock in 1612 to study at the University of Rostock. His first known composition, Sertum musicale primum, was published in Rostock in 1614. A man valued for his skills as a cantor and composer, he was recruited away from Rostock by Anthony Günther, Count of Oldenburg; an appointment the city council of Rostock attempted and failed to controvert. The Count of Oldenburg refused to let him out of his service, and he did not return to Rostock until 1618 when he became cantor at St. Mary's Church; a post he remained in until his death 20 years later. During these two decades he was the dominant musical influence in Rostock; producing a significant body of music, both sacred and secular, which filled the city's churches and public halls. His music was an integral part of the public events and life of the city both in and out of the church. In addition to his work as a composer and cantor, Friderici also was appointed Kapellmeister over all of the churches in the city and organized numerous special music events in the city during his lifetime. One of these included a special concert celebrating the 200th anniversary of the University of Rostock in 1619.

Composer Nikolaus Hasse (c.1617–1672) was the organist at St. Mary's Church from 1642-1671. While his organ compositions have largely been forgotten today, his chamber music of dances written originally for use by the students at the University of Rostock was published in two volumes in Delitiae musicae (1656–8) and has remained in the repertoire. Hasse is also known for his 50 sacred songs published by the theologian Heinrich Müller in the collection Geistliche Seelen-Musik.

A devastating 1677 fire in Rostock greatly impacted the cultural life of the city, including impeding the city's musical development. After this fire, the employment of city musicians greatly decreased, and by 1697 only one employed musician remained on the payroll. However, as the city recovered in the early 1700s and the middle class began to take a more prominent place in society, the end of the Baroque period saw an increase in the number of amateur musicians participating in performing music. In 1726 the first of many public amateur concerts was presented in the city; a tradition which would continue long into the future.

== Classical period ==
In the Classical period, the use of amateur concerts became increasingly more important to the city life of Rostock. In particular, Rostock composers Eucharius Florschütz (1756–1831) and Friedrich Wilhelm Pannenberg made use of these concerts, which became known as 'Wochenkonzerte' in 1757, to present their music. Both of these men took a lead role in organizing musicians and putting together repertoire for the concerts.

Likewise, the employment of professional musicians increased during this period. In 1751 the Hoftheater opened in Rostock which served as an opera house for the city. The theater presented operas and operettas presented by traveling troupes of performers from both German and Italian origins. Two more opera houses opened in the decades following, the Ballhaus and the Schauspielhaus, but the city never maintained a permanent opera company during this era.

In 1769 Rostock hosted its first public concerts of professional virtuoso musicians visiting from outside the city. Florschütz established an orchestra in Rostock, the Stadtkapelle Rostock, which began presenting monthly public concerts beginning in 1781.

== Romantic period ==
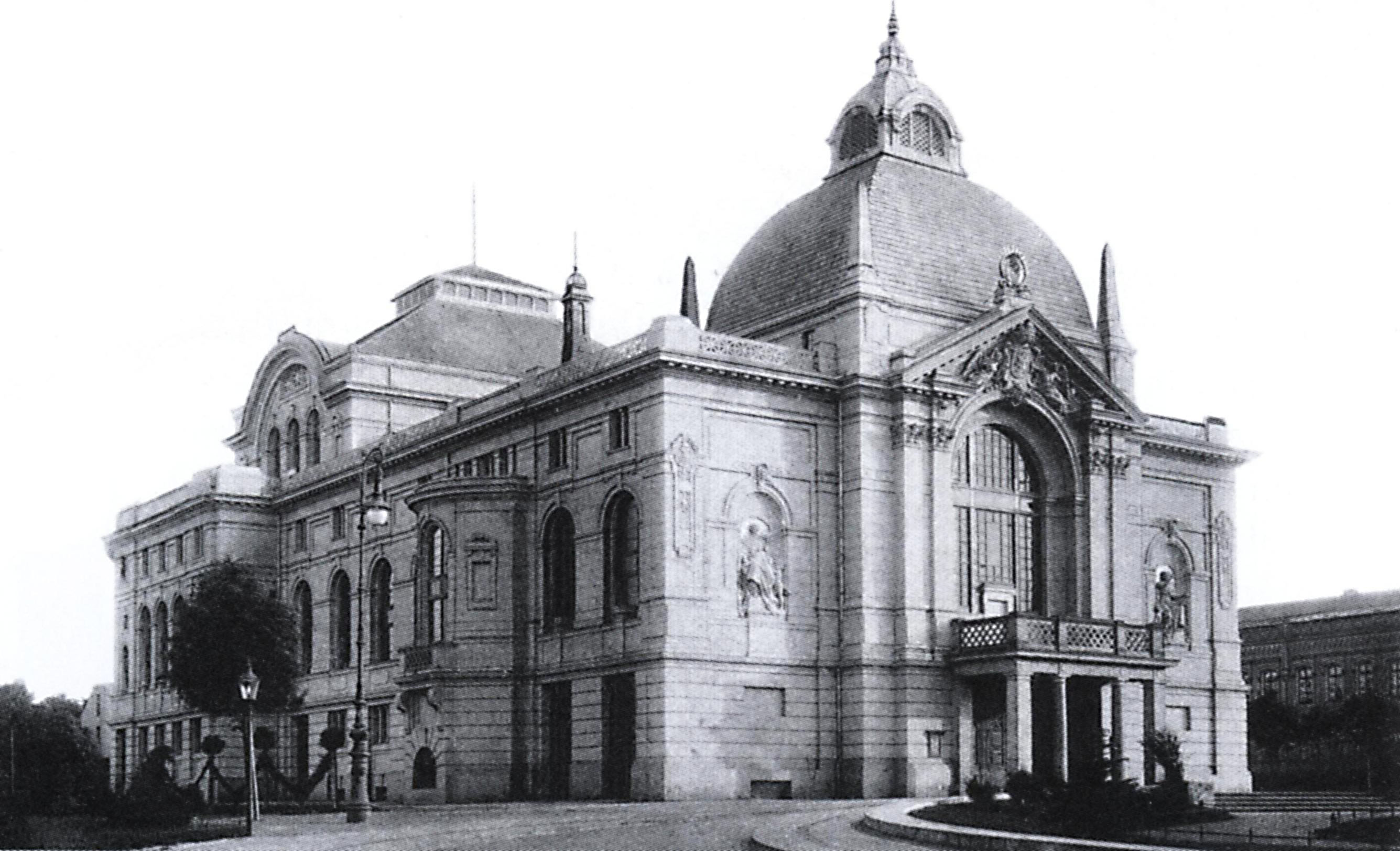
Stadttheater Rostock (1895-1942)

Gustav Eggers (1835–1860) and Karl Graedener (1812–1883) were the most important composers of the Romantic period in Rostock. The first Rostocker Musikfest was held in 1819. It was organized by J.A. Göpel, the organist of the Jakobikirche, partly as a venue to showcase a concert by a choral society he had founded in that same year. This choir, now known as the Rostocker Singakademie, still exists today.

Rostock hosted the fourth Norddeutsche Musikfest in 1843; an event directed by Heinrich Marschner. Rostock hosted three of the 15 Mecklenburg Festivals in the second half of the 19th century. The most important of these was directed by Hermann Kretzschmar in 1885. Kretzschmar served as the director of music at the University of Rostock from 1877 through 1887. He also founded the Rostocker Konzertverein in 1877; an annual orchestra concert series featuring the Verein Rostocker Musiker, an orchestra made up of musicians from the 'Bürgerkapelle’ and the Hautboisten-Corps.

The opera singer Theodor Reichmann (1849–1903) was born and raised in Rostock before training as a baritone in Berlin and becoming an internationally known artist.

In 1895 the Stadttheater Rostock opened. Willibald Kähler was the conductor there from 1897 to 1899 and helped establish a tradition of quality Wagner opera performances at that theatre. Conductors Arthur Nikisch and Richard Strauss had conducting assignments at the theatre soon after. In 1897 the Norddeutsche Philharmonie Rostock was established as the house orchestra for the Stadttheater Rostock.

== 20th and 21st centuries ==
Carlfriedrich Pistor (1884-1969) is the most significant 20th-century composer from Rostock. While his music has largely been forgotten outside of the region, an archive of his compositions and personal papers is part of the collection of the music library at the University of Rostock. Composer Emil Mattiesen (1875-1939) contributed greatly to the music community in Rostock in the 1920s and 1930s. After moving to the city in 1925, he taught church music at the University of Rostock from 1929 until he died of leukemia in 1939. His compositions of lieder, song cycles, ballads, chamber music, and organ music were performed at music events in the city during this time.

In 1934 musicologist Erich Schenk established the Musicological Institute at the University of Rostock; serving as the director of the organization through 1940.

In 1942 the city was bombed and the Stadttheater Rostock was destroyed.
