= Petrikirche =

Petrikirche means St. Peter's Church in German and may refer to any of a number of churches in German-speaking regions.

== Germany ==
- St. Peter's Church, Hamburg
- St. Peter's Church, Herford
- St. Peter's Church, Rostock
- The former Petrikirche in Cölln, Berlin: see Fischerinsel#Notable buildings
