= Hans Schmidt-Isserstedt =

German conductor and composer

External audio
- Shellac recordings with Hans Schmidt-Isserstedt in the Online Archive of the Österreichische Mediathek

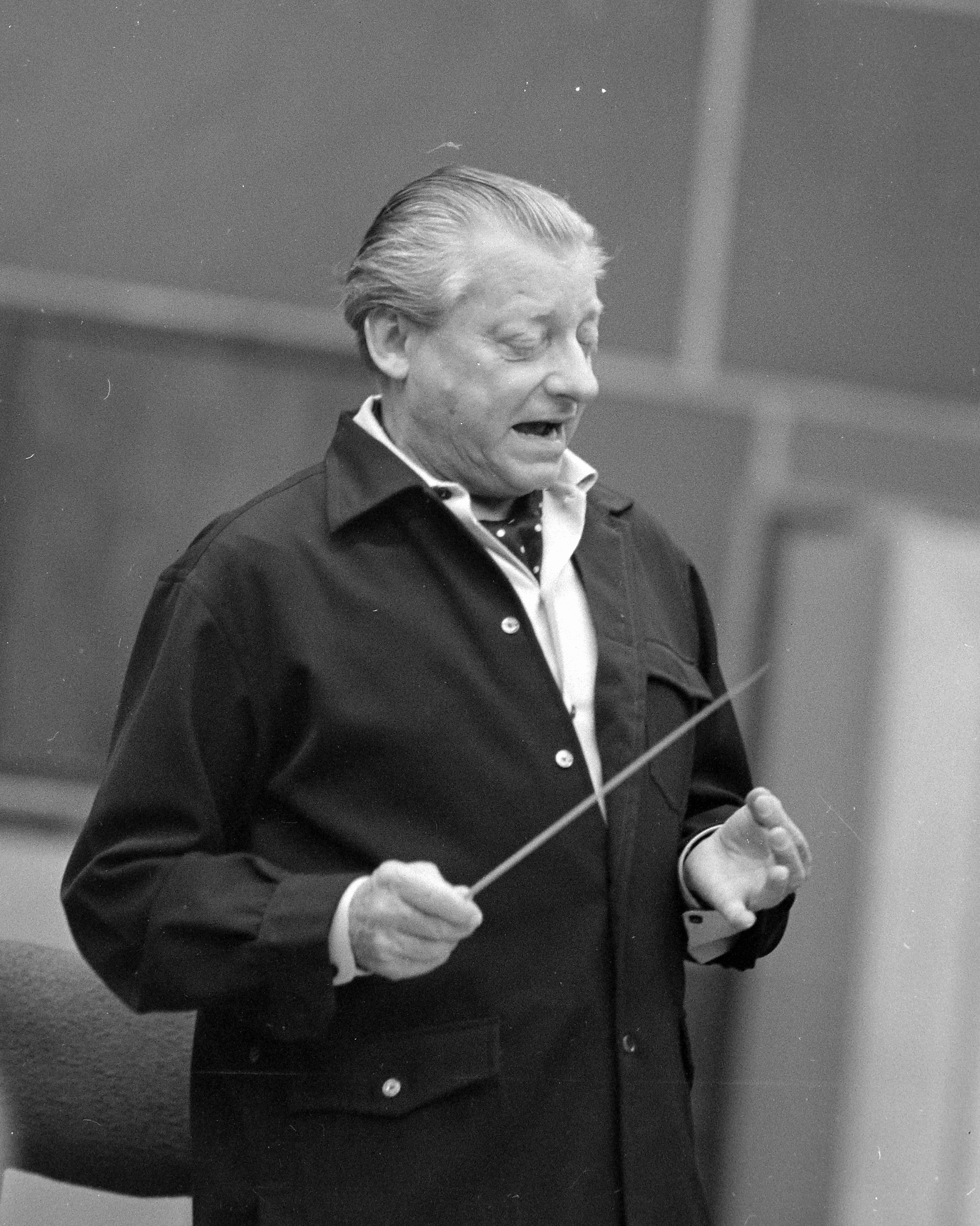
Schmidt-Isserstedt, c. 1965

Schmidt-Isserstedt, c. 1960

Hans Schmidt-Isserstedt (5 May 1900 – 28 May 1973) was a German conductor and composer. After studying at several music academies, he worked in German opera houses between 1923 and 1945, first as a répétiteur and then in increasingly senior conducting posts, ending as Generalmusikdirektor of the Deutsche Oper Berlin.

After the Second World War, Schmidt-Isserstedt was invited by the occupying British forces to form the Northwest German Radio Symphony Orchestra, of which he was musical director and chief conductor from 1945 to 1971. He was a frequent guest conductor for leading symphony orchestras around the world, and returned to opera from time to time, including appearances at Glyndebourne and Covent Garden as well as the Hamburg State Opera.

Schmidt-Isserstedt was known for his transparent orchestral textures, strict rhythmic precision, and rejection of superfluous gestures and mannerisms on the rostrum. His extensive recorded legacy features the Austro-German classics with which he was widely associated, but also includes works by Czech, English, French, Italian and Russian composers.

== Life and career ==
=== Early years ===
Schmidt-Isserstedt was born in Berlin on 5 May 1900. He studied composition with Franz Schreker at the Berlin Hochschule für Musik, and was also a student at the universities of Heidelberg and Münster and Berlin. At the last of these he wrote a doctoral dissertation on the Italian influences on the instrumentation of Mozart's early operas. Early music influences on him included the conductors Arthur Nikisch and Felix Weingartner.

In 1923, Schmidt-Isserstedt joined the Wuppertal Opera as a répétiteur. He held conducting positions at the Stadttheater Rostock (1928–1931), conducting the municipal orchestra, and of the Staatstheater Darmstadt (1931–1933). In 1935 he was appointed of first conductor at the Hamburg State Opera, a post he held until 1943. In that year moved to the Deutsche Oper Berlin as director of opera, and became Generalmusikdirektor there the following year. He managed to hold these senior posts – and to be put on the Gottbegnadeten list of the Third Reich's élite artists – despite avoiding joining the Nazi Party, and having a Jewish wife, whom he sent to England for safety, with their two sons, in 1936.

=== Post-war ===
In 1945, after the end of the Second World War, the occupying British forces set up a new radio station, the Nordwestdeutscher Rundfunk, based in Hamburg. The director-general, Hugh Greene, appointed Schmidt-Isserstedt as director of music, and tasked him with assembling and training a symphony orchestra for the station. The conductor's biographer Hubert Rübsaat writes that he formed an orchestra "out of nowhere" ("aus dem Nichts"). He took as his models the BBC Symphony Orchestra in London and the NBC Symphony Orchestra in New York – orchestras formed primarily for broadcasting, with the highest standards of playing. It took him six months to bring the new Northwest German Radio Symphony Orchestra (NWDR SO) to the standard he required, and in November 1945 he conducted its first public concert. In a survey of radio orchestras in 1955, The Musical Times commented that the NWDR SO had quickly been recognised as "fit to challenge even the Berlin Philharmonic".

For the next 26 years, Schmidt-Isserstedt remained musical director of the NWDR SO. He invited many guest conductors to work with the orchestra, but its regular studio broadcasts were mostly under his direction. He introduced a public concert season, giving ten programmes a year. The repertoire was wide, including works by composers whose music had been banned by the Nazis, such as Bartók, Stravinsky and Hindemith and recent works by Tippett, Britten and other contemporary composers. Schmidt-Isserstedt and the orchestra toured abroad, playing in France, Britain, the USSR and the US. From 1955 to 1964, he combined his duties at Hamburg with those of principal conductor of the Royal Stockholm Philharmonic Orchestra, and he appeared as a guest conductor with more than 120 orchestras in the principal musical centres around the world.

Schmidt-Isserstedt returned to opera from time to time. His first post-war opera production was Purcell's Dido and Aeneas at the Hamburg State Opera, and in the late 1940s he gave the first German performances of Britten's version of The Beggar's Opera. For Glyndebourne Festival Opera, both at its base in Sussex and at the Edinburgh Festival, he conducted Così fan tutte, Le Comte Ory, Ariadne auf Naxos and The Soldier's Tale, and a celebrated series of performances of The Marriage of Figaro (1958), with a cast he considered near ideal, including Geraint Evans, Pilar Lorengar, Graziella Sciutti and Teresa Berganza. At the Royal Opera House, Covent Garden, he conducted Tristan und Isolde with Wolfgang Windgassen and Birgit Nilsson in the title roles (1962) and Der fliegende Holländer with Donald McIntyre as the Dutchman (1972).

Among Schmidt-Isserstedt's own compositions were songs, the opera Hassan gewinnt (Rostock, 1928), and works for orchestra.

Schmidt-Isserstedt died in Holm, Pinneberg, near Hamburg, on 28 May 1973, aged 73. The Times summed up his achievements:

Schmidt-Isserstedt aimed at a transparent orchestral texture and strict rhythmic precision, rejecting all superfluous gestures and mannerisms. After World War II he became an advocate of Bartók, Stravinsky and Hindemith, whose music had long been outlawed in Germany. But his chief love was Mozart, whose works he conducted in a remarkably relaxed and delicate way. This is shown particularly by his recordings of Idomeneo and La finta giardiniera.

== Recordings ==
Schmidt-Isserstedt was active in the recording studio from 1934 onwards. His early discs included a series of concerto performances with the violinist Georg Kulenkampff, described by The Times as "wonderful". They were made for Telefunken, and included the violin concertos of Beethoven, Mendelssohn, Schumann and Brahms.

After the war, Schmidt-Isserstedt recorded for many companies, including Decca. The Times describes Schmidt-Isserstedt's 1953 recording of Dvořák's Seventh Symphony with the NWDR SO as "a classic". That recording was produced by John Culshaw. but Schmidt-Issersted's son Erik Smith later joined the company and produced many of his father's recordings. Among the major projects Schmidt-Isserstedt undertook for Decca was a cycle of the Beethoven piano concertos with Wilhelm Backhaus and the Vienna Philharmonic Orchestra recorded in 1958–59, and a cycle of the nine Beethoven symphonies, with the same orchestra, recorded between 1965 and 1969. The Times said of them, "they are typically sane, searching interpretations, quite free from personal mannerisms, and so highly recommendable for long acquaintance".

When Erik Smith left Decca to work for Philips Records, his father began to record for that company. His last recording, made shortly before his sudden death, was Brahms's First Piano Concerto with Alfred Brendel and the Concertgebouw Orchestra. Although he was associated with the Austro-German classics, his recorded repertoire included works by Czech, English, French, Italian and Russian composers.

== References and sources ==
=== Sources ===
- Rübsaat, Hubert (2009). Hans Schmidt-Isserstedt (in German). Hamburg: Ellert & Richter. OCLC 699318058.
- Slonimsky, Nicholas; Laura Kuhn; Dennis McIntire (2001). "Schmidt-Isserstedt, Hans". In Laura Kuhn (ed.). Baker's Biographical Dictionary of Musicians (8th ed.). New York: Schirmer. ISBN 978-0-02-866091-2.

Cultural offices
Preceded by (no predecessor)	Principal Conductor, North German Radio Symphony Orchestra; 1945–1971	Succeeded by Moshe Atzmon
Preceded by Carl Garaguly	Principal Conductor, Royal Stockholm Philharmonic Orchestra; 1955–1964	Succeeded by Antal Doráti
