= Nikolaus Hasse =

Nikolaus Hasse, sometimes spelled Nicolaus Hasse, (c.1617 – March 8, 1672, Rostock) was a German composer and organist of the Baroque period. Part of the Hasse family of musicians, he was the son of Peter Hasse. A longtime organist at St. Mary's Church, Rostock, he is best remembered today for his compositions of chamber music and sacred songs.

== Life and career ==
Born in Lübeck, Hasse received his music education from his father, the composer Peter Hasse. In 1642 he was appointed organist at St. Mary's Church, Rostock; a position he maintained until his retirement in 1671. His life was often plagued with financial difficulties, and he died soon after his retirement on March 8, 1672 in Rostock.

Nikolaus Hasse is principally remembered for his compositions of chamber music and sacred songs; both of which have remained in the repertoire. All of his chamber music, encompassing 21 suites and 14 other dances in a variety of styles of the period, were published in a two volume set entitled Delitiae musicae in 1656. These pieces were originally written for play by students at the University of Rostock and became a part of the musical life of that school during Hasse's lifetime. After their publication, the works spread. The theologian Heinrich Müller published 50 of Hasse's sacred songs in the collection Geistliche Seelen-Musik, and these are the best known of his surviving sacred works.

Hasse also wrote lieder and organ music; but these are less known. Only four of his organ work survive, all of them published in the Pelplin organ tablatures.
