= Peter Hasse =

German organist and composer

Peter (Petrus) Hasse (ca. 1585 – June 1640) was a German organist and composer, and member of the prominent musical Hasse family. The first written record of Hasse dates from his appointment as organist at the Marienkirche in Lübeck, a post later held by Buxtehude. Although virtually nothing is known of Hasse's early life, he is believed to have been a student of Sweelinck between 1606 and 1609. Hasse remained in Lübeck until his death in 1640, and achieved considerable fame at the time as a teacher and performer. His son, Nikolaus Hasse, was among his pupils, and became a musician in his own right. Hasse's own surviving output is small, consisting of just three organ works and two choral works. After his death in 1640, Hasse's position as the main organist at the Marienkirche was taken by Franz Tunder.

== Nikolaus Hasse ==
Nikolaus Hasse was born in Lübeck c. 1617. He was appointed organist of the Marienkirche, Rostock and held this post until 1671. He published Delitiae Musicae in 1642 which contains all his chamber music (21 suites). Much information about his life is not clear. He also composed some German songs and other occasional works. Hasse's other instrumental works consist of chorale preludes. He died at Rostock ?8 March 1672.
