= Heinrich Müller (theologian) =

German devotional author, writer of hymns, Lutheran minister and theologian

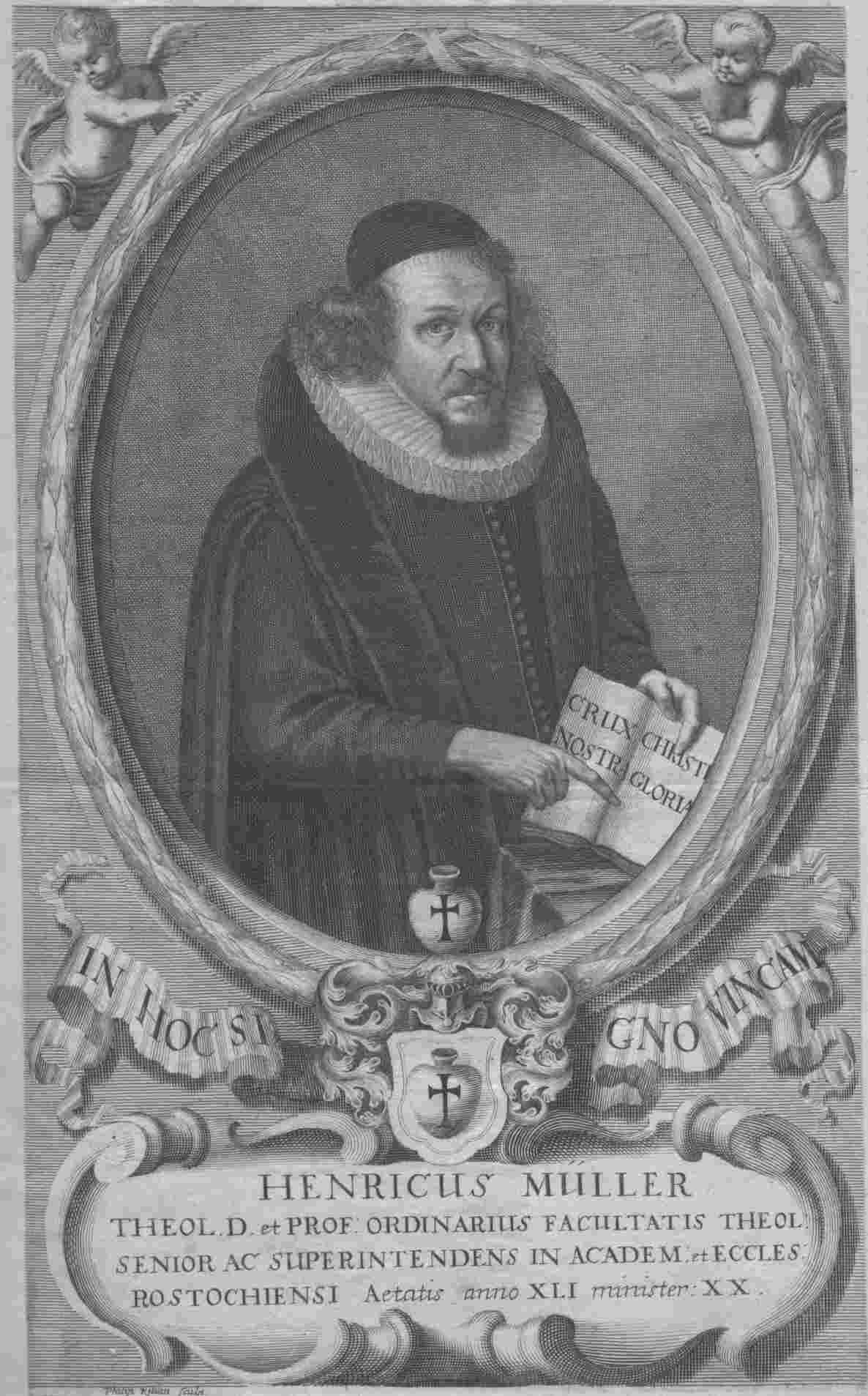
Heinrich Müller.

Heinrich Müller (18 October 1631 – 13/23 September 1675) was a German devotional author, Protestant writer of hymns, a Lutheran minister and theologian and a professor at the University of Rostock from 1647 to 1650. He famously denounced the font, the pulpit, the confessional, and the altar as "the four dumb idols of the Lutheran Church". He died in Rostock, aged 43.

== Life ==
Heinrich Müller was born into a family originally from Rostock. His father, Peter Müller, was a citizen, merchant and trader, as well as church leader of Marienkirche in Rostock, his mother, Ilsabe, was the daughter of Matthäus Stubbe and Ilsabe (née Schmied). His parents fled to Lübeck during the Thirty Years' War, during which Rostock was first occupied by imperial troops and from 1631, by Swedish troops, and Heinrich was born there. Heinrich Müller attended the city school in Rostock and entered the University of Greifswald in 1647 on the advice of Johann Quistorp the Elder. In 1650, at his parents' request, he returned to Rostock and studied at the University of Rostock with professors Caspar Mauritius and August Varenius.

In 1651, he earned the academic degree of Magister from the dean of the philosophical faculty, Johannes Corfinius, and was also able to hold his first lectures. In the same year he traveled to Johann Botsack in Danzig, then to Coelestin Myslenta and Christian Dreier in Königsberg. He also visited Leipzig, Wittenberg, Lübeck, Lüneburg, Brunswick, Wolfenbüttel, Helmstedt and Halle, where he met with important theologians.

In 1652, he was Archidiaconus to Marienkirche in Rostock. In 1659, he was appointed professor of the Greek language and in 1660, he received his doctorate in theology. After Caspar Mauritius was appointed to Hamburg, he took over the position of professor of theology as well as becoming pastor at Marienkirche in 1662. After the death of Johann Kentzler, he became Superintendent at Marienkirche.

Heinrich Müller was considered dogmatic orthodox and, in the tradition of Martin Luther, took a stand against grievances in the church. He was a representative of the internalization of Christianity. He called the baptismal font, pulpit, confessional and altar "church idols": "Today's Christianity also has four mute church idols that it follows, the baptismal font, preaching post, Confessional, Altar; She consoles herself with her outward Christianity, that she is baptized, hears God's word, goes to confession, receives the Lord's Supper, but she denies the inner power of Christianity." His passion sermons were widespread and probably formed one of the textual templates for the parts of the St Matthew Passion by Johann Sebastian Bach, which represent a third level of text alongside the Bible text and the chorale texts.

Heinrich Müller worked as a edifying writer. In 1659, he published his first work, Der himmlische Liebes-Kuß (The Heavenly Love Kiss), an almost thousand-page consideration of the various aspects of divine love with several emblematic engravings. It was repeatedly reprinted until the 19th century. He also wrote a collection of cantatas that were published under the titles Geistliche Seelen-Musik (Spiritual Soul Music) and Himmlische Liebesflamme (Heavenly flame of love). In his publication Geistliche Erquickungsstunden (Spiritual hours of refreshment) (1664-1666) he used the term Übermensch in the German language for the first time in the sense of a "godly man". Overall, his work includes nine German and ten Latin titles.

== Family ==
On January 24, 1654, Heinrich Müller married Magaretha Elisabeth, the daughter of the citizen and church leader in St. Marienkirche Michael Sibrand. The marriage produced five sons and one daughter. Peter Müller, Christian Bernhard Müller and their daughter Catarina Elisabeth Müller died when they were very young. Johann Michael Müller, Heinrich Müller and Caspar Matthäus Müller survived the father.

== Selected works ==
- Der himmlische Liebes-Kuß
- Die ungeratene Ehe
- Tränen und Trostquelle
- Die göttliche Liebesflamme
- Die Seelenmusik
- Die Kreuzschule
- Der Dankaltar

A selection of his Geistliche Erquickstunden was published again and again, for example by Johann Georg Rußwurm in 1822, and appeared again in 1938 in a selection by Gottfried Holtz.
