= Rudolf Helm =

German classical philologist (1872–1966)

Rudolf Helm (2 March 1872 – 29 November 1966) was a German classical philologist.

== Life ==
Born Rudolf Wilhelm Oskar Helm in Berlin, he studied at the University of Berlin. After completing his studies, Helm traveled through Italy and Greece on a travel grant from the German Archaeological Institute. He was an assistant teacher for a short while. In 1897, he accepted the position of assistant to the Professor of Classical Philology at the Institute for Ancient Studies of the University of Berlin. As an assistant, Helm gave lectures, managed the institute's library, and assisted students. In 1899, he became a private lecturer until 1907 when he was appointed Associate Professor of Classical Philology at the University of Rostock, later becoming a full professor. In July 1920, Helm became the rector of the University until 1922.

He was suspended from teaching in 1933 from May to November because of mismanagement of club dormitory funds. Helm retired temporarily from 1937 to 1945, until he returned to teaching as a Professor of Classical Philology at the University of Rostock. He retired in 1948 and died in Kiel.

== Works ==
Helm edited all of the non-philosophical work by Apuleius, a task which took him 10 years to complete.
