= St. Peter's Church, Rostock =

Coordinates: 54°05′26″N 12°08′53″E

St. Peter's Church, in German Petrikirche, was built in the 13th century and is the oldest of three town churches in the Hanseatic city of Rostock, in northern Germany. The other two are St. Mary's Church (Marienkirche) and St. Nicholas (Nikolaikirche). A fourth, St. Jakobi, was heavily damaged during the Second World War and subsequently demolished.

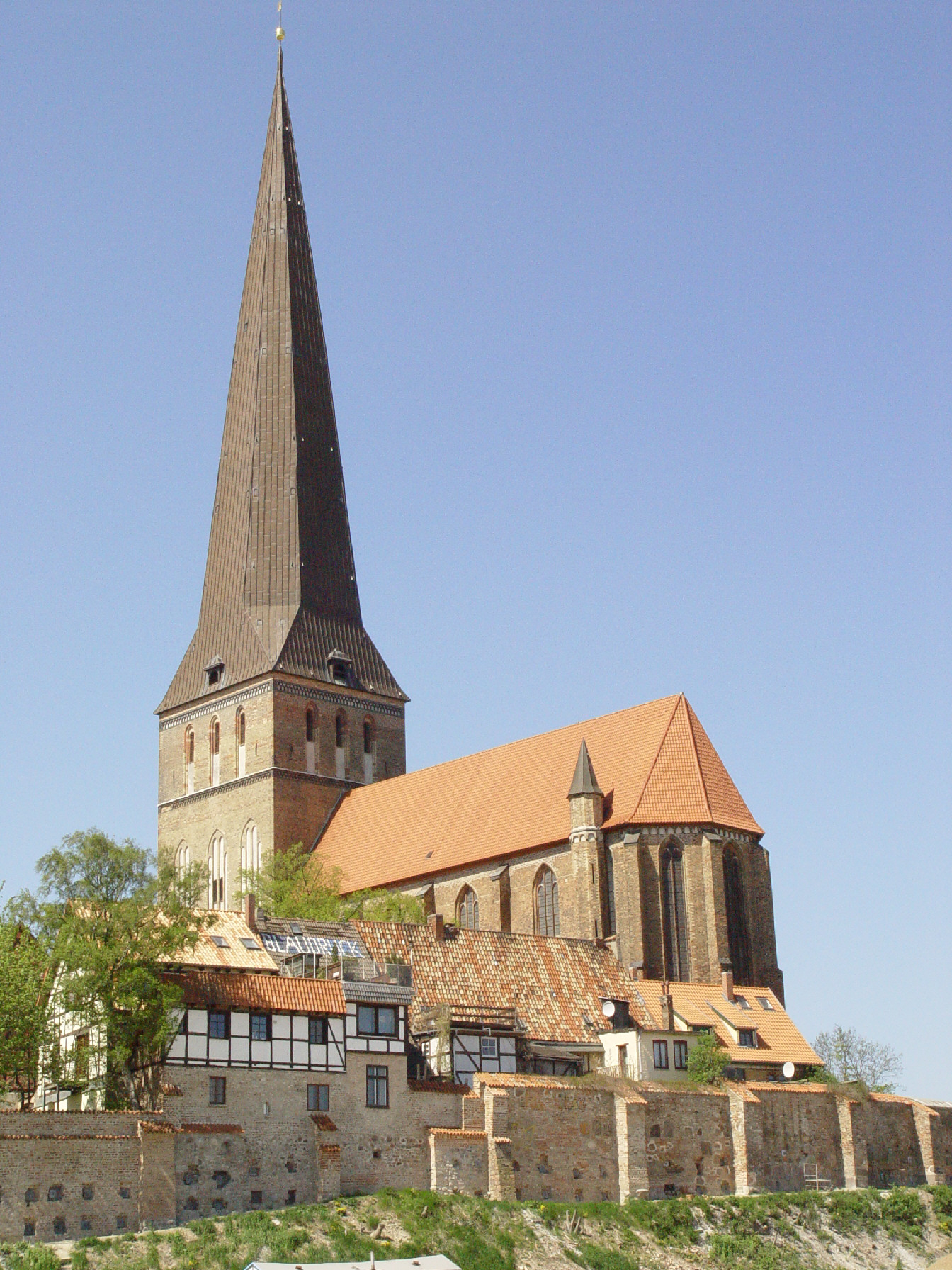
St. Petri in 2006

== Building ==
St. Peter's Church was built in the middle of the 13th century. The first reference to a church on this site is in 1252, which is thought to be the predecessor of the current building. The triple-nave basilica is in Brick Gothic, a building style typical of the Hanseatic port cities of northern Germany.

== Damage ==
The existing church had a tower 127m (413 feet) high, which was destroyed by a lightening strike in 1543. In 1578 the tower was rebuilt as a polygonal spire after it had once again been damaged by a storm. With a height of 117m (380 feet), the tower served as a landmark for the local area. After the Protestant Reformation, the church was used by a Lutheran congregation.

In the following centuries the church decayed, and in 1902 the Basilica was renovated. Forty years later, however, in 1942, heavy bombing during World War II again damaged the church and led to the collapse of the polygonal spire.

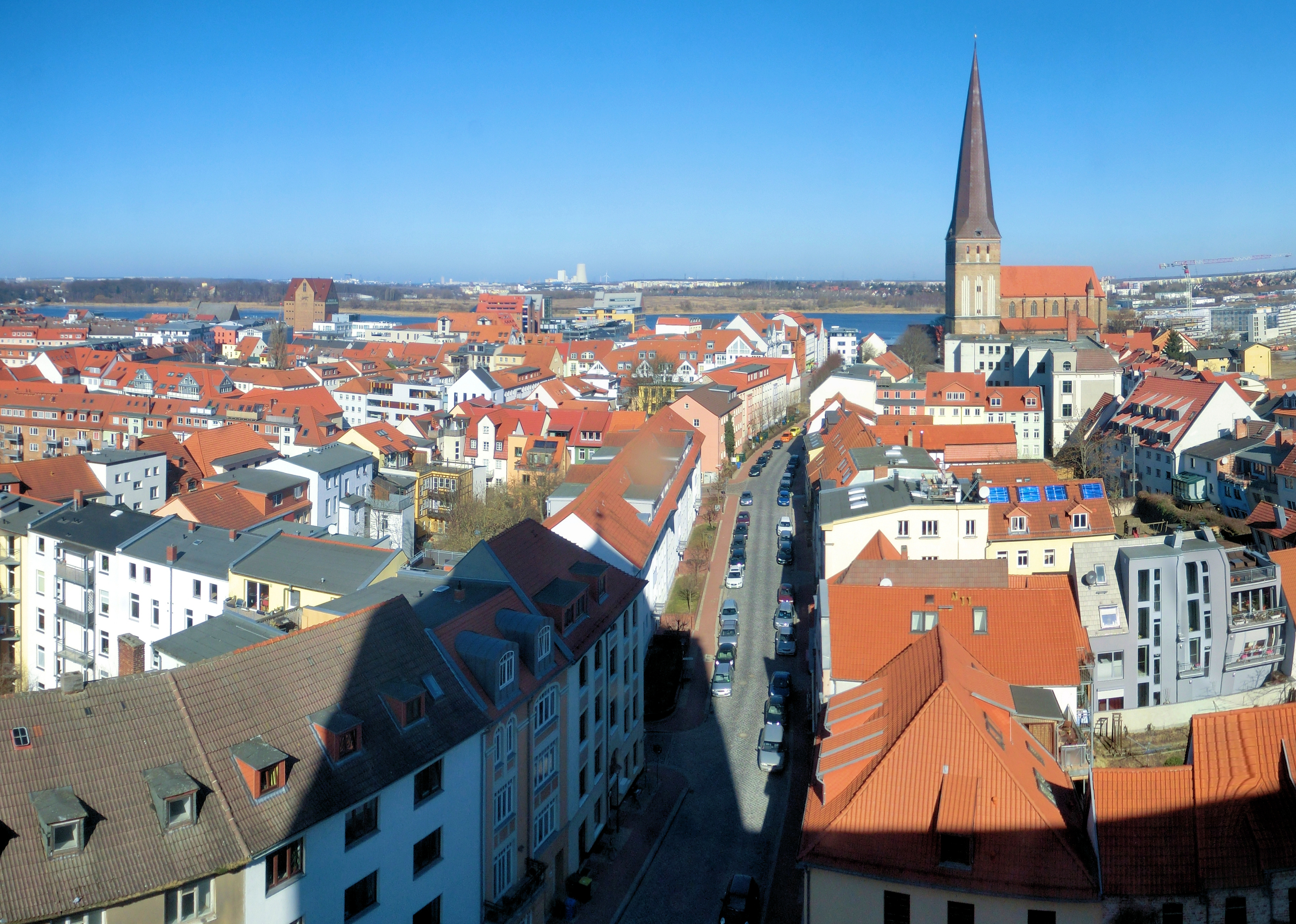
View over the eastern part of Rostock's old town towards St. Petri

== Rebuilding ==
Following the war, the building was gradually rebuilt. Today the church, roofed by a flat timber ceiling, reaches a height of 24m (78 feet). In 1994 a glass window in the choir was built to a height of 17m (55 feet). 1994 was also the year when the rebuilt spire was completed.

Public donations funded the building of a copper polygonal spire. With this, St. Peter's once again became a visible landmark in the surrounding area. Additionally, a 45m (146 feet) observation platform (accessed via steps and an elevator) provides fine views of the city of Rostock and the Baltic Sea.

== Description ==
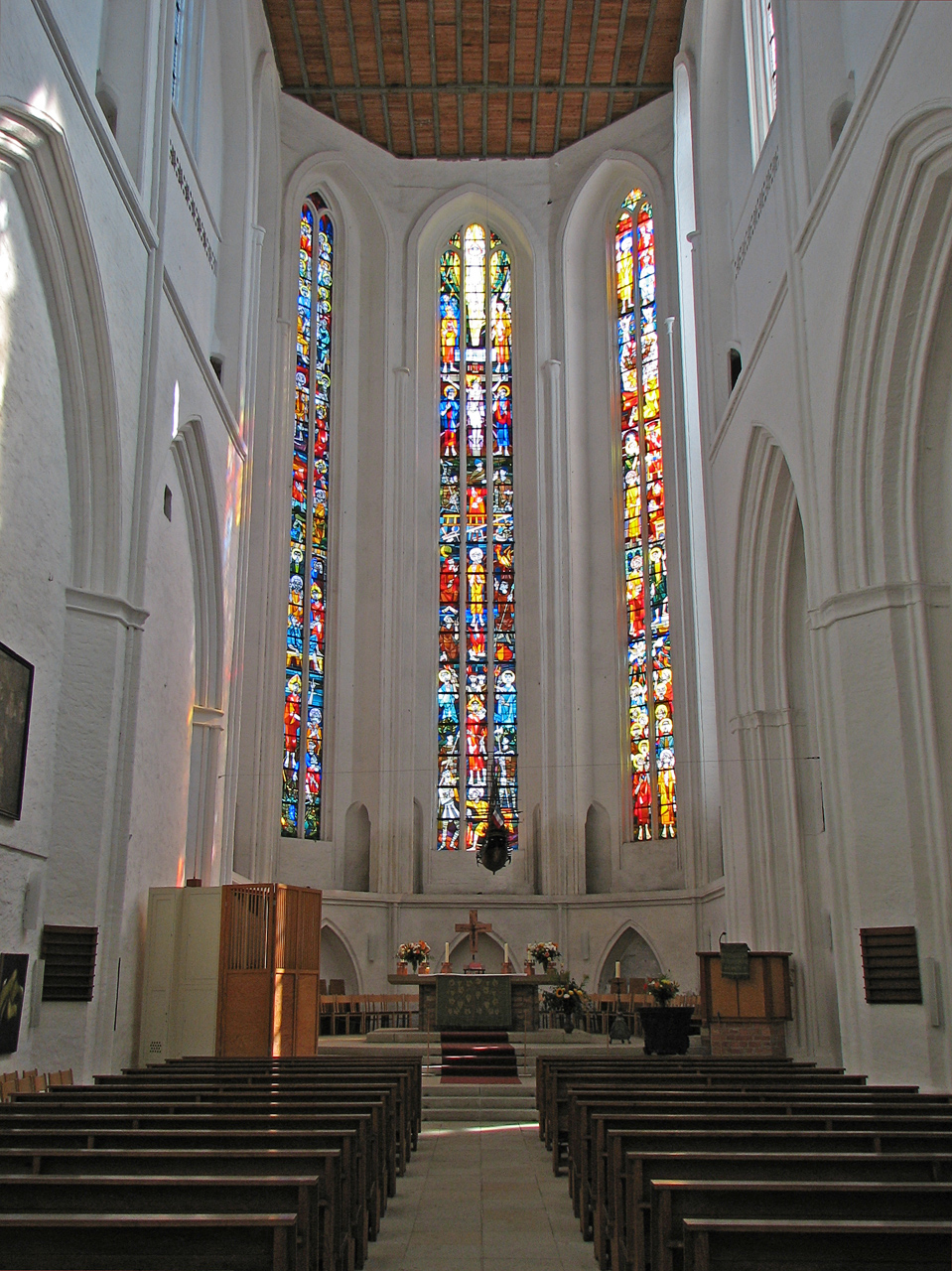
Interior

The church is a three-nave Basilica with a high cross-vaulted ceiling in the west tower. On the north and south façade 4 times over are ever-alternating round arched arcades, each with a large rectangular window. In the central aisle of the tower, three high, round, arched arcades sit on each side except the eastern side, where the tower joins the Basilica; at each of the four points there are three round-arched windows. The choir section is polygonal; at the north and south ends are small stair towers with pointed roofs. The design of the dividing inner-wall (zweizonige) exhibits the round-arched arcade design typical of Roman-Gothic style.

Prior to World War II damage, the arched gallery was open. But it had been only roughly rebuilt when reconstruction began. The light coming in from the large rectangular windows, flows over the gallery. The cross-ribbed vaulted ceiling that covers the northern end of the nave is preserved.

However, the southern nave was too badly damaged to reconstruct the original. Also, the central nave couldn’t be restored, so instead a flat-timbered ceiling was put in place. The baroque decoration in the interior of the church was destroyed by fire during the World War II bombing of Rostock on the night of 26 and 27 April 1942.

The stained glass windows of the choir are decorated with scenes from the life of St. Peter. They were designed in the early 1960s by local artist Lothar Mannewitz (1930–2004).
