= Stadttheater Rostock =

Former theater in Rostock, Germany

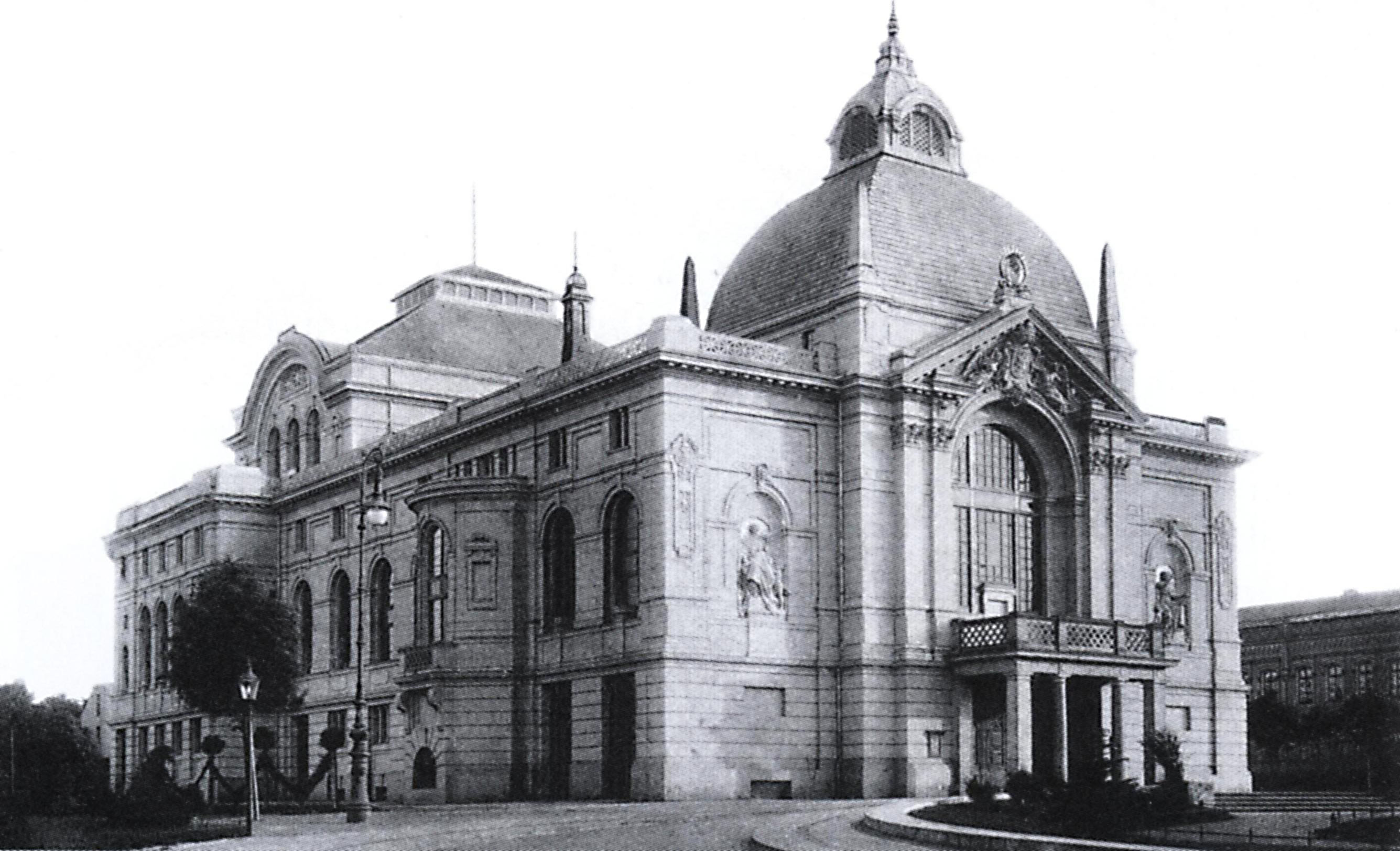
Stadttheater Rostock (1895-1942)

The Stadttheater Rostock, sometimes referred to as the Rostocker Stadttheater, was a theatre in Rostock, Mecklenburg-Vorpommern, Germany. Designed by architect Heinrich Seeling, it was built in 1894. The theatre opened to the public in 1895, and was the largest theatre in the city of Rostock until it was destroyed in an air raid in 1942 during World War II. The theatre served as the city's primary opera house in addition to hosting other kinds of performances on occasion.

The Stadttheater Rostock was particularly respected for its stagings of the operas of Richard Wagner, and was referred to as the 'Bayreuth of the North'. This reputation was established early in the theatre's history when conductor Willibald Kaehler led several critically lauded stagings of Wagnerian operas from 1897 to 1899. This tradition continued through the rest of the theatre's history, attracting many top Wagnerian singers and conductors, including Richard Strauss, Arthur Nikisch, Eduard Mörike, and Hans Schmidt-Isserstedt.
