= St. Mary's Church, Rostock =

Church in Rostock, Germany

St Mary's Church
- Marienkirche
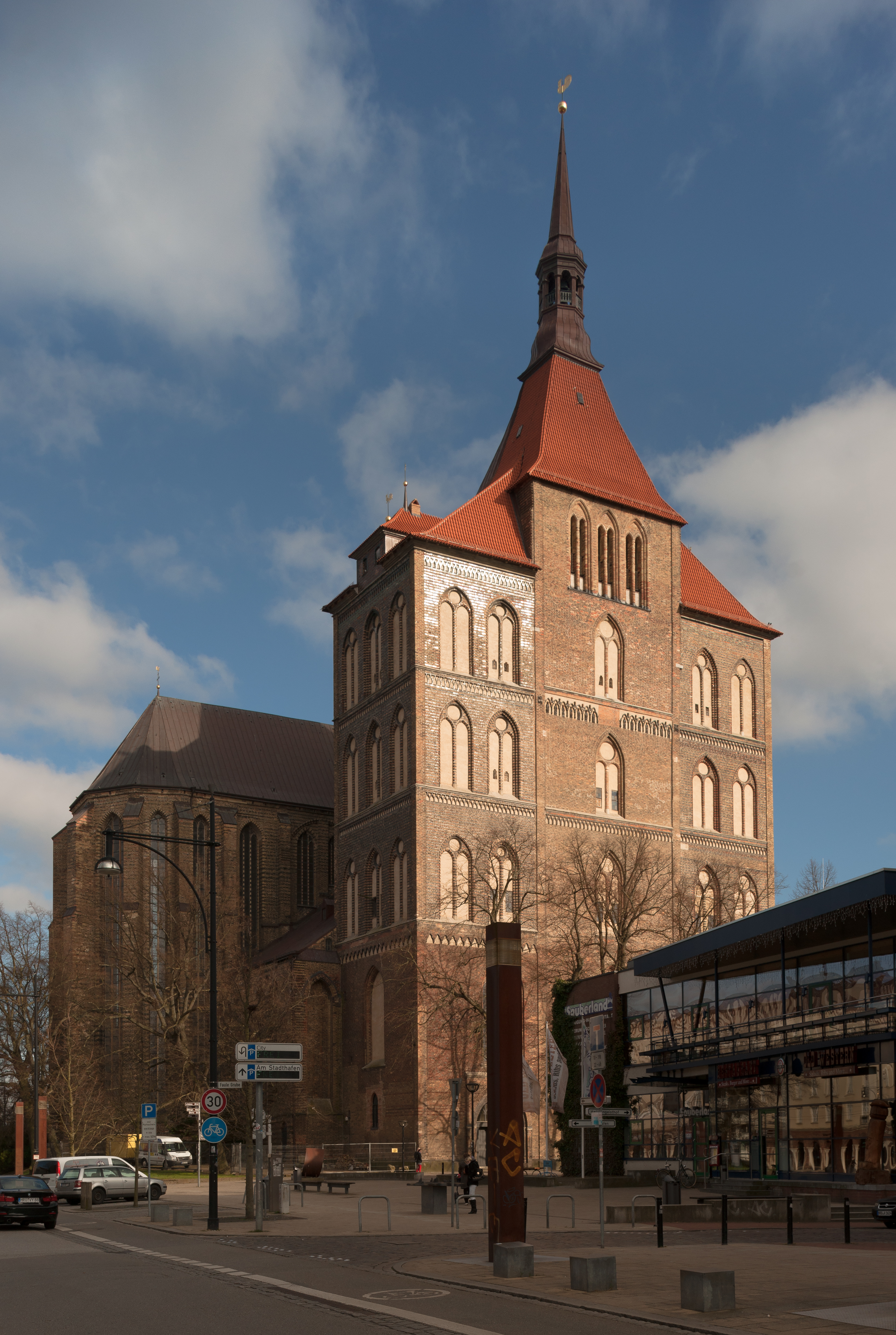
- Western front of St. Mary
- St Mary's Church
- 54°5′24″N 12°8′20.4″E
- Country: Germany
- Denomination: Lutheran
- Previous denomination: Roman Catholic

Architecture
- Style: Gothic

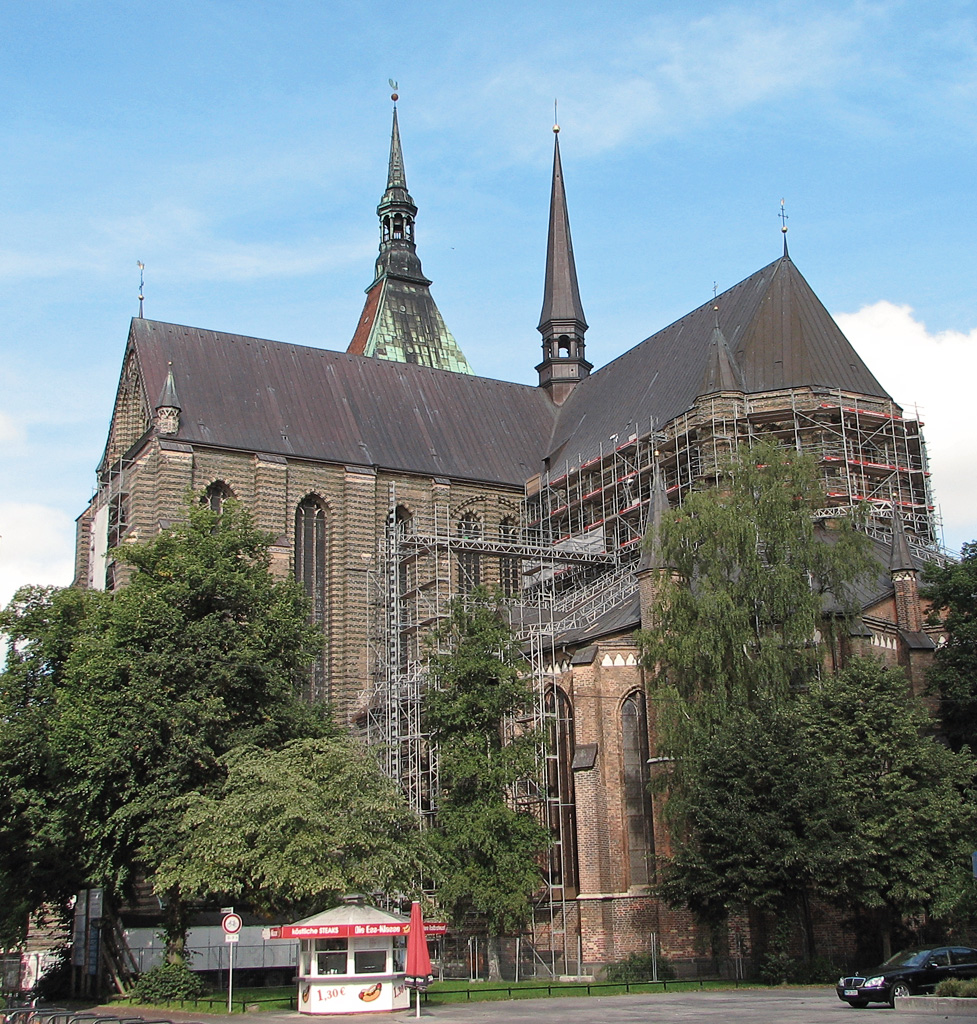
St. Mary's Church with transept (left) and choir

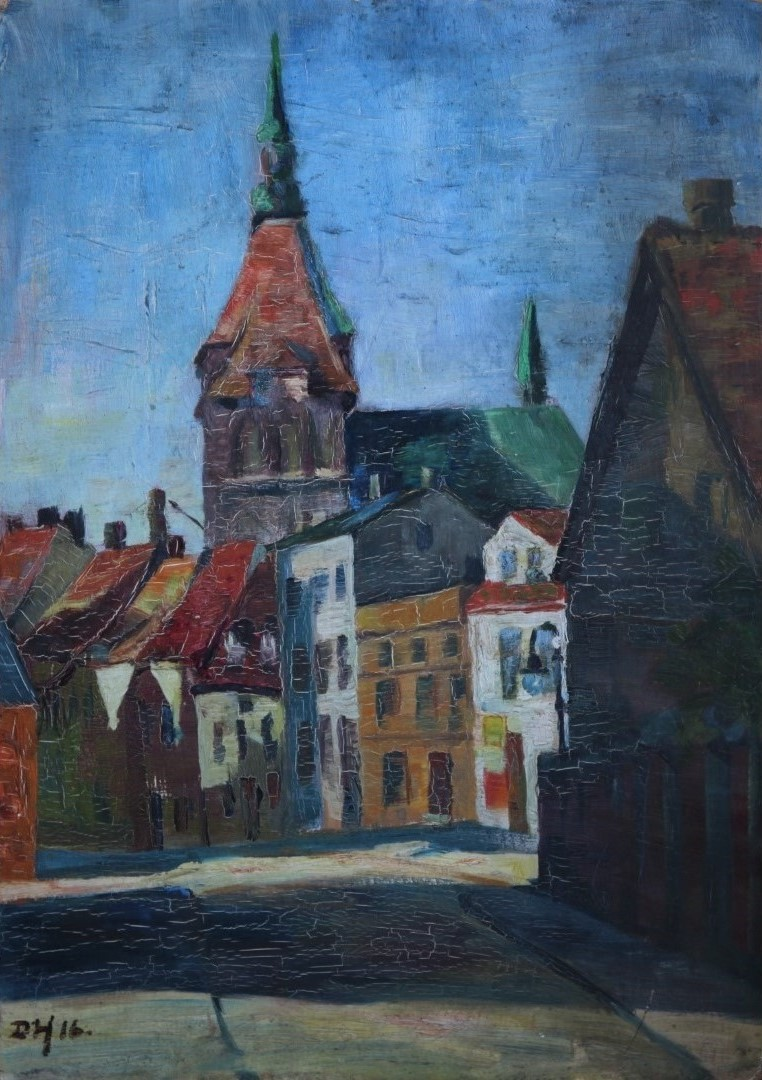
Dörte Helm "St. Mary´s Church" (1916)

St. Mary's Church, Rostock, in German Marienkirche, is the biggest of three town churches found in the Hanseatic city of Rostock, in northern Germany. The other two are St. Peter's (Petrikirche) and St. Nicholas (Nikolaikirche). A fourth, St. James' (Jakobikirche), was heavily damaged during the Second World War and subsequently demolished. St. Mary's was designated in 1265 as the main parish church. Since the Protestant Reformation in 1531, it houses a congregation of the Evangelical Lutheran State Church of Mecklenburg.

== Building ==
St. Mary's Church, on Ziegenmarkt, is a large Brick Gothic church. Built in the 13th century, it was enlarged and modified at the end of the 14th century into the present basilica. The first reference to a church on this site is in 1232, which is thought to be the predecessor of the current building. The triple-nave cross-shaped basilica is in Brick Gothic, a building style typical of the Hanseatic port cities of northern Germany. The huge tower with a baroque lantern at the top was not completed until the end of the 18th century.

== Interior ==
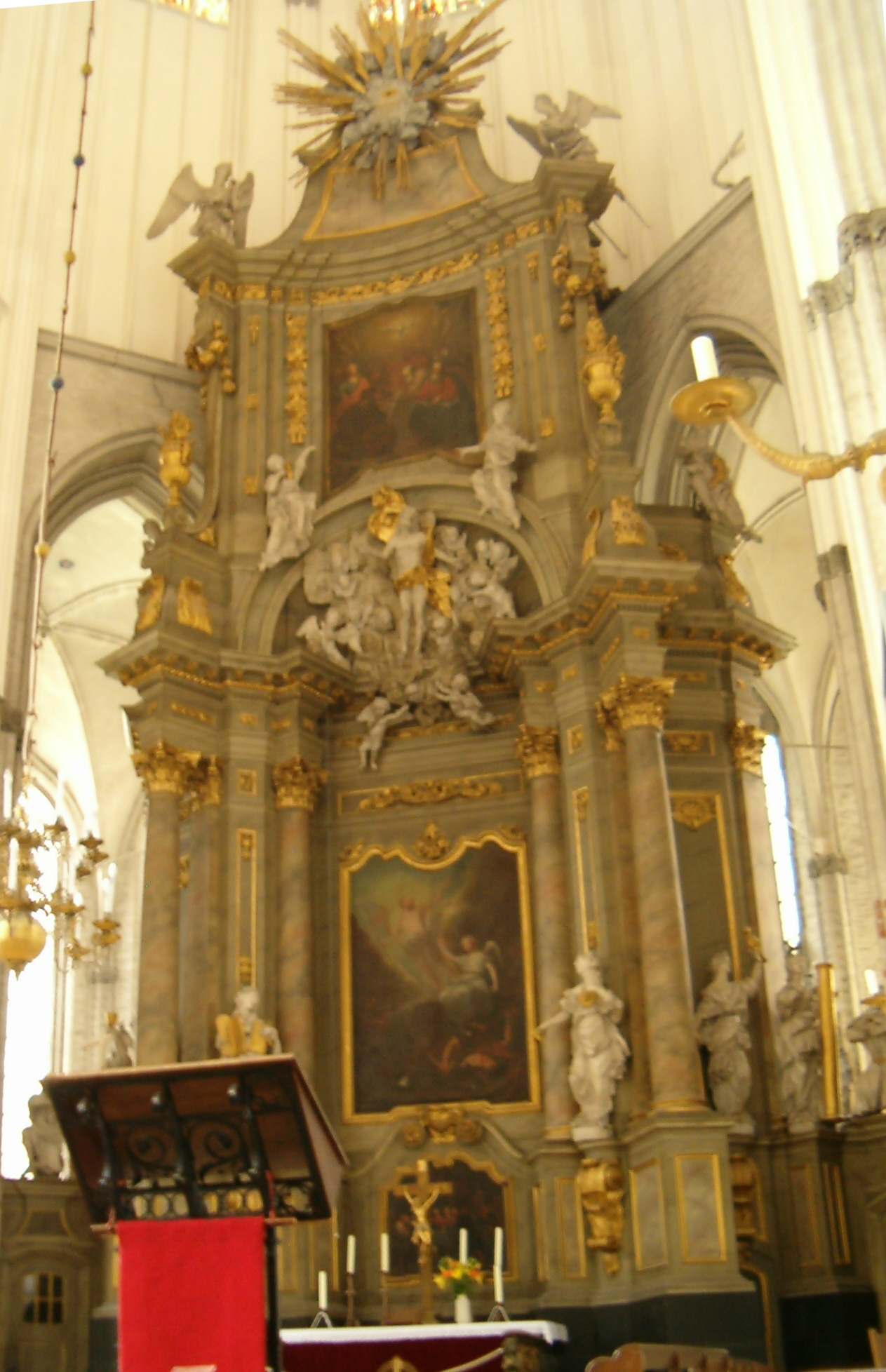
The gilded high altar depicts important biblical themes.

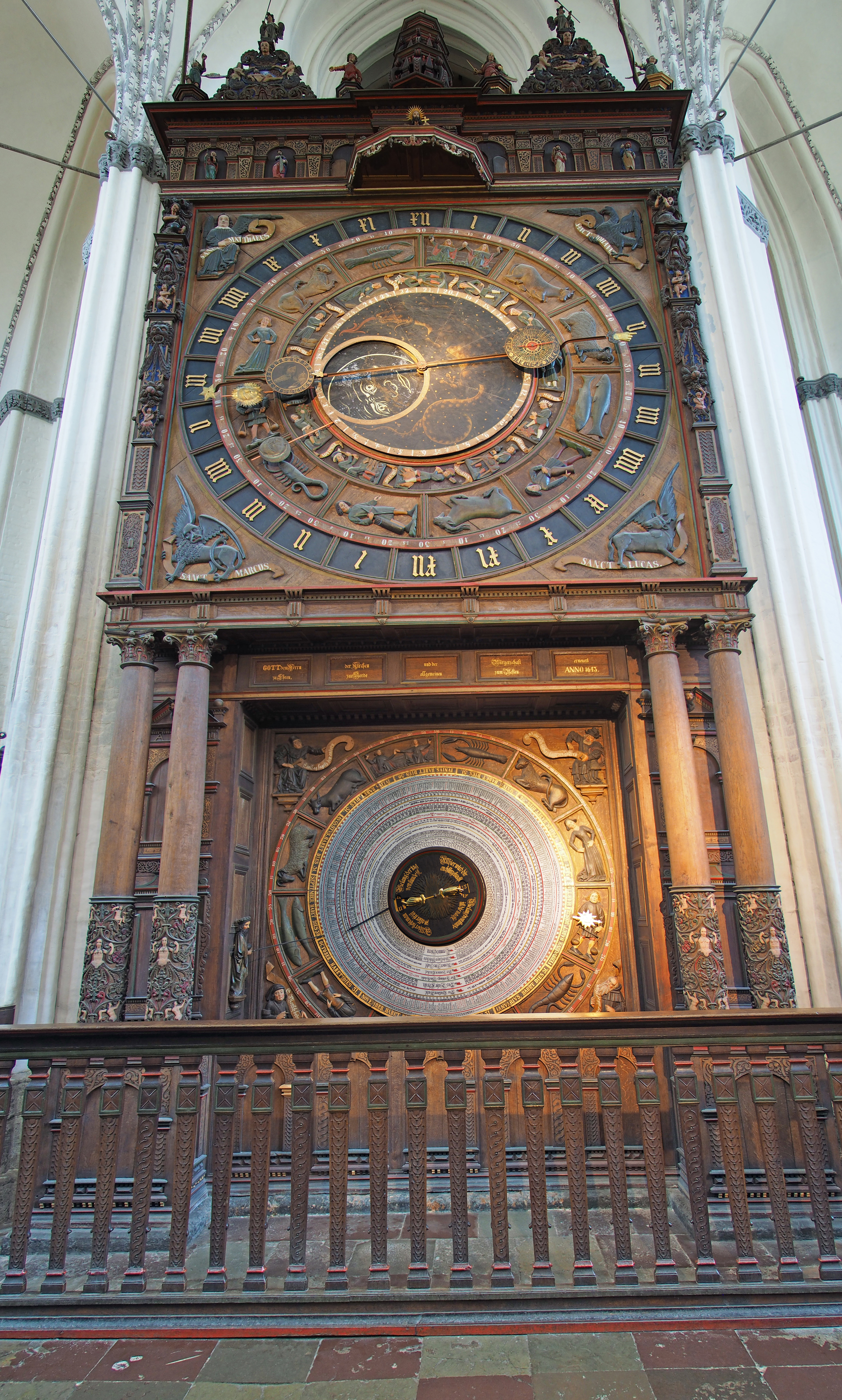
The medieval astronomical clock at St. Mary's.

High Altar

The high altar was built in 1721 by a Berlin craftsman, mainly from painted wood. The altar shows in three pictures; Bottom: " The Last Supper "; Middle: " The Resurrection "; Top: " The Effusion of the Holy Spirit " .

Pulpit

The Pulpit in the style of Renaissance made by Rudolf Stockmann in 1574. It was the first item of decoration to be installed in St. Mary's Church after the Reformation. Decorated with scenes from the passion of Jesus and a baroque abat-voix from 1723, the pulpit now creates the effect of a unit. To compensate for the poor acoustics in St. Mary's, the pulpit was built in the middle of the church to ensure closeness to the congregation.

Stained Windows

The monumental south portal window of the transept with a height of 26 meters shows The Day of Judgement. It is one of the largest single stained glass windows in Europe and was made by "Tyrolean stained glass Innsbruck" from 1894 till 1904. It survived the Second World War in various states of disrepair. It was thoroughly restored between 2003 and 2008 by a Mecklenburgean master from Dresden, and equipped with a protective glazing.

Astronomical Clock

See Rostock Astronomical Clock

Baptismal Font

The Bronze font from 1290 is one of the oldest pieces in St. Mary's. The font is decorated with scenes from the life and passion of Jesus. The font is carried by four kneeling men ( representing Earth, Water, Air and Fire ) and the lid is crowned by a bronze eagle. According to the inscription, the basin was founded for Easter 1290 and the work was carried out in a Rostock workshop. During World War II, the Bronze font was hidden somewhere in Mecklenburg by the church staff to prevent it from being melted down for war material.

St. Roch Altar

The late gothic St. Roch altar is a side altar, of which there were once 39 in this church. Manufactured from oak wood in 1530, the master carver was likely part of the circle around carver Benedict Dreyer of Lübeck. In the centre of the shrine is the patron Saint Roch. An angel points to the plague spot, the attribute of the deadly disease. Roch is a saint of the Black Death. Scholars believe that the altar was built and set up in connection with Black Death epidemics in Europe, which also ravaged Rostock.

== Organ ==
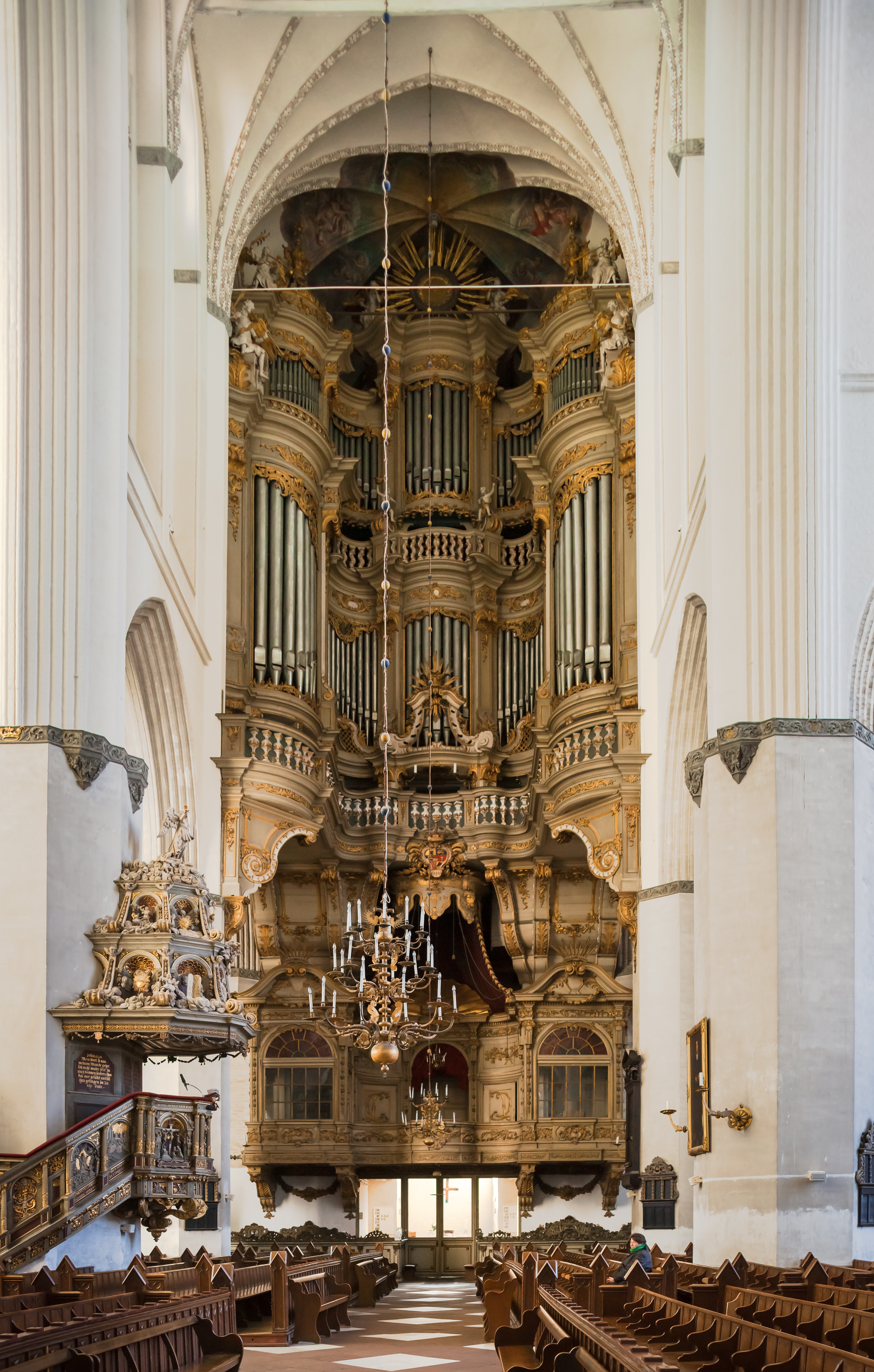
The organ from 1770

The huge baroque facade of the "Marienorgel" was designed and built in 1770 by Paul Schmidt, organ builder of Rostock. Because of faults in the wind supply, it did not fulfill the expectations and it was completely rebuilt in 1793 by Ernst Marx of Berlin. Further modifications were undertaken at the end of the 19th century. In 1938, the organ was rebuilt again by the Sauer firm of Frankfurt/Oder. Today, it contains 83 stops with 5.700pipes, playable by electro-pneumatic action on four manuals and pedal. About 30 stops have been retained from the previous instruments.

== World War II ==
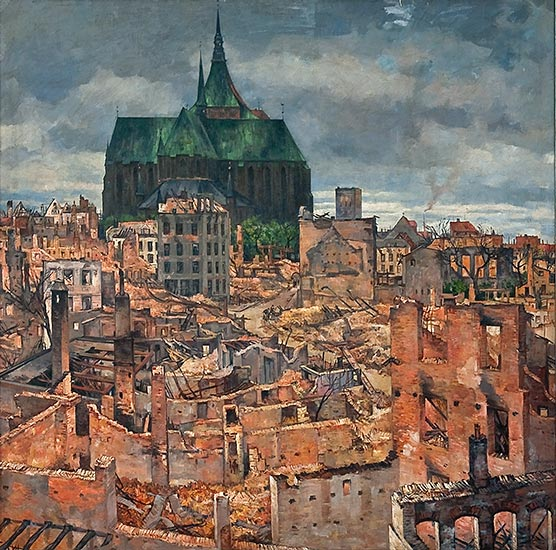
Egon Tschirch ″Die zerstörte Stadt″ (″The destroyed town″, 1942)

During the heavy air raids by the Royal Air Force in 1942, which lasted three days, much of Rostock was destroyed. The sexton of St. Mary's, Mr. Bombowski, saved the church by decisive action. Although three incendiary bombs smashed through the roof of the tower, he extinguished the fire with the help from his daughter and a German auxiliary airforce commando. Former "NSDAP Kreisleiter" (the local Nazi party leader) and then Lord Mayor of Rostock, Walter Volgmann, said, "The old hut should have burned down". Inside the church is a famous picture by the painter Egon Tschirch from 1942, which depicts St. Mary's Church surrounded by ruins.

== Rostock skyline with St. Mary's ==
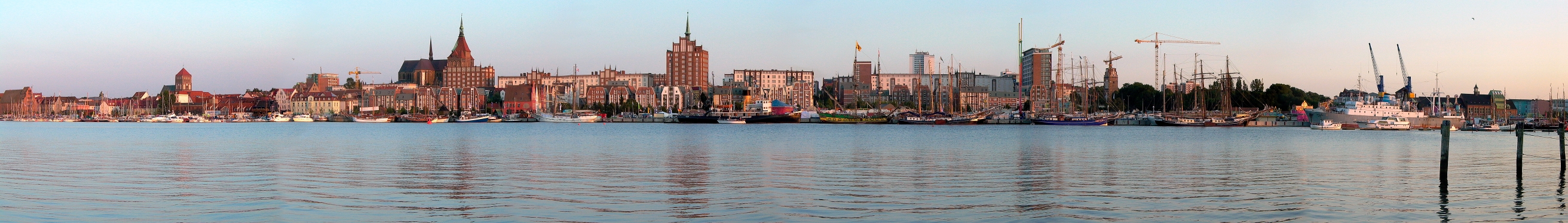
Panorama of Rostock from the bank of the Warnow river during the Hanse Sail with St. Mary's Church in the middle and St. Nicholas Church on the left

== Notable people ==
- Daniel Friderici, cantor at St. Mary's Church from 1618-1638
- Nikolaus Hasse, organist at St. Mary's Church from 1642-1671

== Sources ==
- "Architekturführer DDR Bezirk Rostock " - Verlag für Bauwesen, 1977
- "In deinen Mauern herrsche Eintracht und allgemeines Wohlergehen", Karsten Schröder - Ingo Koch Verlag, 2002
- "ROSTOCK - a tour of the city under the symbols of bull and griffin", Selma Kleinfeldt - Klatschmohn Verlag, 1997
- "Tadellöser & Wolff ", Walter Kempowski - Random House, 1996
