= Elbersdorf =

- Ortsteil of Dürrröhrsdorf-Dittersbach
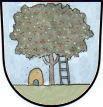
- Coat of arms
- Interactive map of Elbersdorf
- Location within Germany Location within Saxony
- Coordinates: 51°01′25″N 13°59′20″E
- Country: Germany
- State: Saxony
- District: Sächsische Schweiz-Osterzgebirge
- Municipality: Dürrröhrsdorf-Dittersbach

Area
  - Total: 2.60 km^{2} (1.00 sq mi)
- Elevation: 250 m (820 ft)

Population (2011)
  - Total: 370
  - Density: 140/km^{2} (370/sq mi)
- Time zone: UTC+01:00 (CET)
  - Summer (DST): UTC+02:00 (CEST)
- Postal codes: 01833
- Dialling codes: 035026
- Vehicle registration: PIR

Elbersdorf is a village in the municipality Dürrröhrsdorf-Dittersbach, in the landkreis Sächsische Schweiz-Osterzgebirge, in Saxony, Germany. The village is near the river Wesenitz and is known for the Belvedere Schöne Höhe: a castle on the top of the hill of the village. Formerly an independent municipality, it was absorbed into Porschendorf in 1969, and with Porschendorf into Dürrröhrsdorf-Dittersbach in 1994.

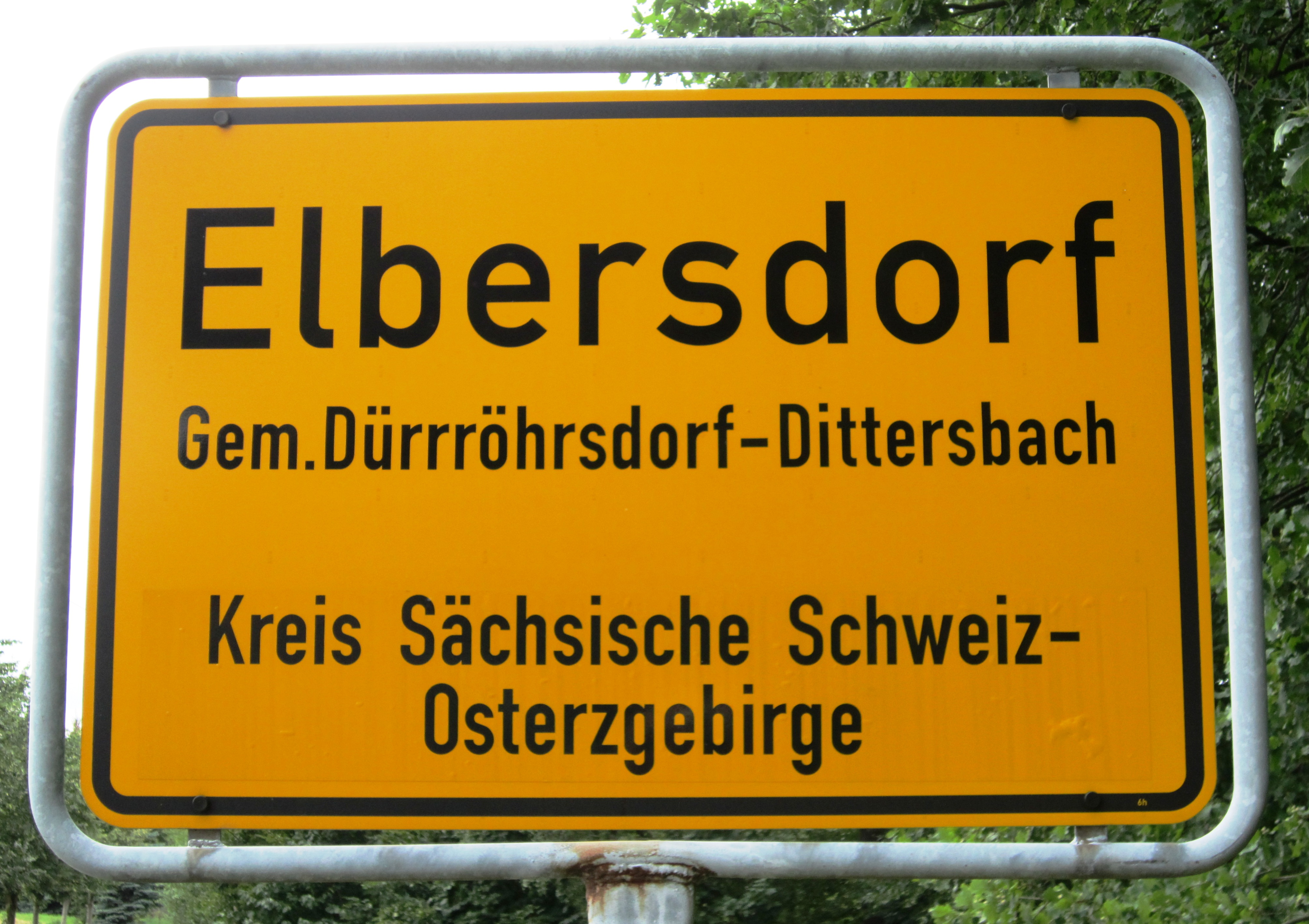
village: Elbersdorf

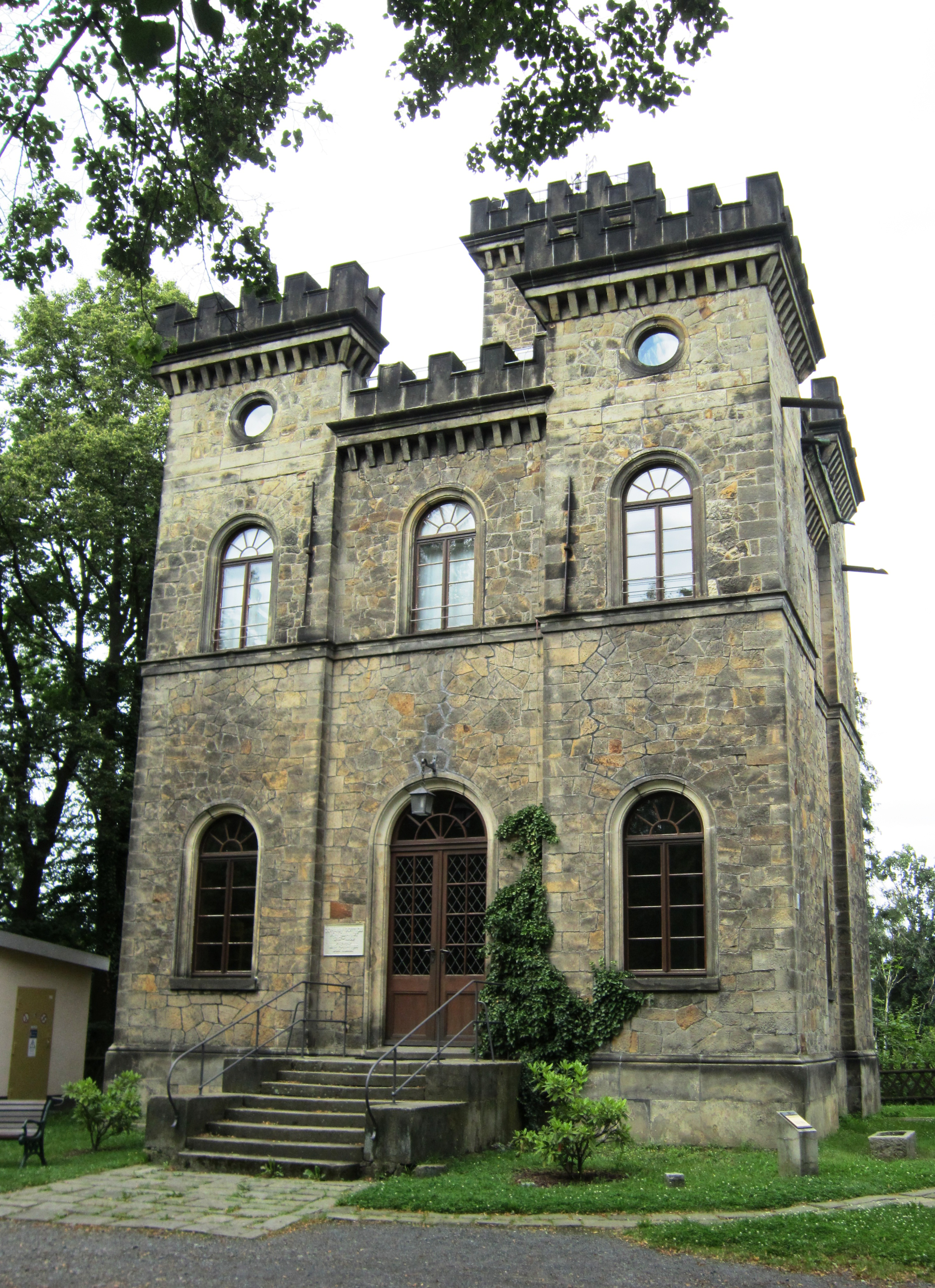
Belvedere Schöne Höhe
