= Richard Guhr =

German sculptor and painter (1873–1956)

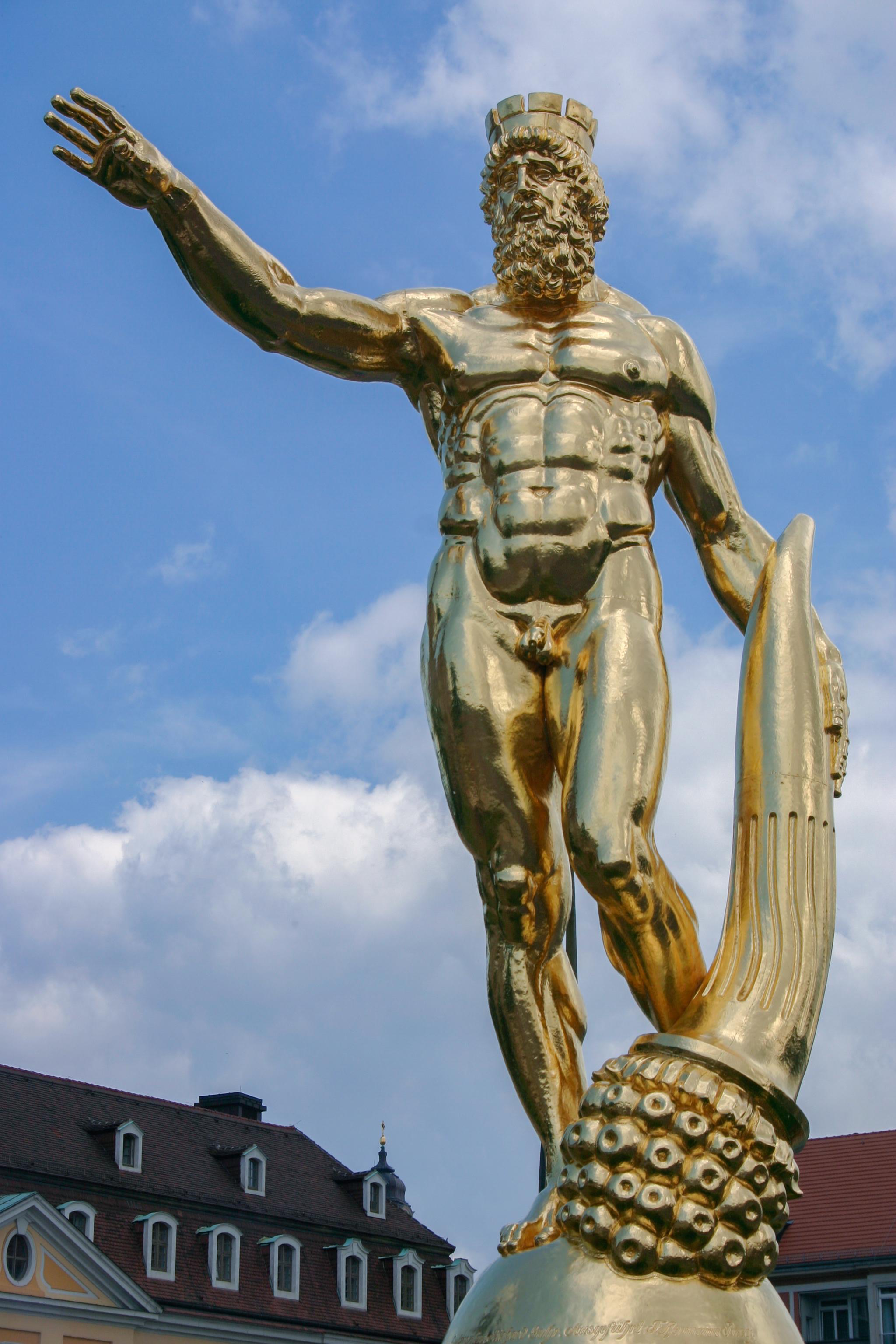
Dresden's landmark on top of the town hall (during reconstruction)

Richard Guhr (30 September 1873 – 27 September 1956) was a German sculptor and painter. He became also known as one of the most important teachers of Otto Dix.

== Biography ==
Guhr was born in Schwerin in 1873. At an age of 17 he came to Dresden, the former home of his parents, to study at the Academy of Applied Arts. From 1892 he continued his studies in Berlin with Alfred Grenander.

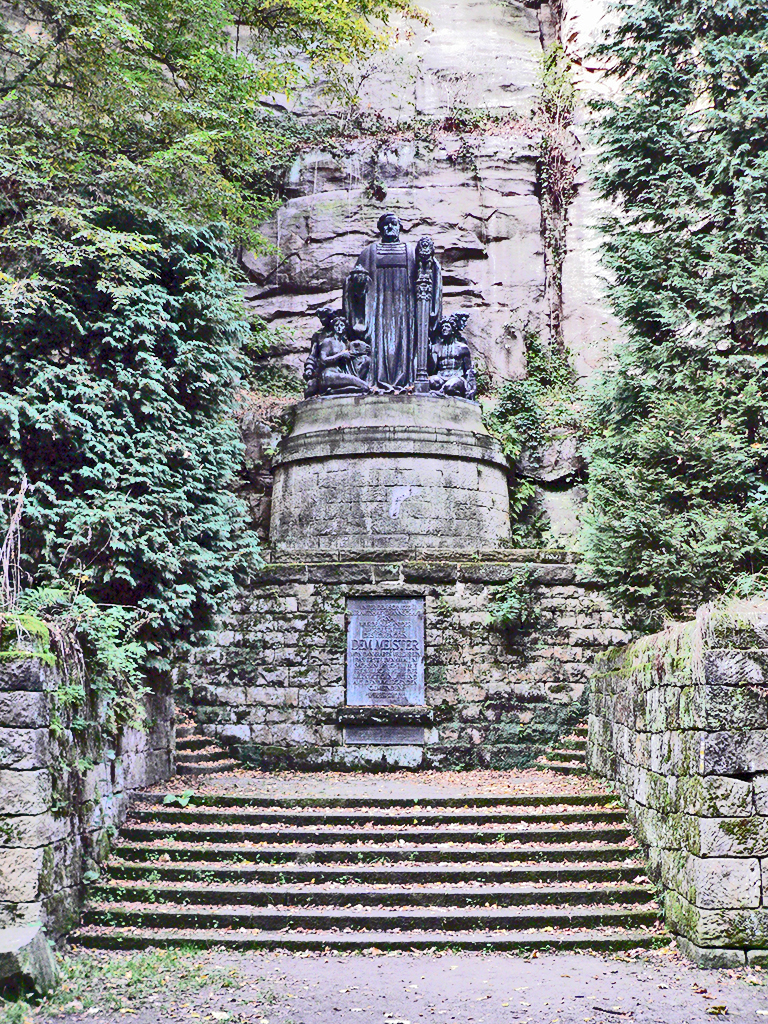
The world's largest memorial to Richard Wagner in the Liebethaler Grund

Richard Guhr contributed to the Louisiana Purchase Exposition 1904 and to the interior of the 1907 opened Hotel Adlon in Berlin. In 1905 he came back to Dresden where he was appointed professor at the Academy of Applied Arts in 1907. From 1910 to 1914 Otto Dix was student in his class of figurative decorative painting. Moreover, Friedrich Kurt Fiedler, Wilhelm Lachnit and Karl Völker were among his students.

Until 1930 Guhr created some important artworks as the Goldener Rathausmann on top of Dresden's town hall, sculptures for the town halls in Barmen and Bremen as well as paintings for the town hall in Bochum.

Guhr was a great admirer of Richard Wagner. Already in 1911 he had designed on his own expenses the world's biggest memorial to the composer. It was originally planned for the Großer Garten, but finally found its place in the valley of the river Wesenitz near Graupa.

During the Weimarer Republik, Guhr participated in the upcoming antisemitism and wrote some publications in which he blamed the Jews for the "decadence in art". In 1934, immediately after the dismissal of his former student and friend Otto Dix, Guhr was appointed professor at the Dresden Academy of Fine Arts.

Many of his works, especially to Richard Wagner, were destroyed in the bombing of Dresden in World War II. Guhr dedicated his last years in Höckendorf to recreate some of these pieces. Guhr died here in 1956.

== See also ==
- List of German painters

== Literature ==
- Joan L. Clinefelter: Artists for the Reich: culture and race from Weimar to Nazi Germany. Berg Publishers, 2005
