= Ludwig Otto =

German painter

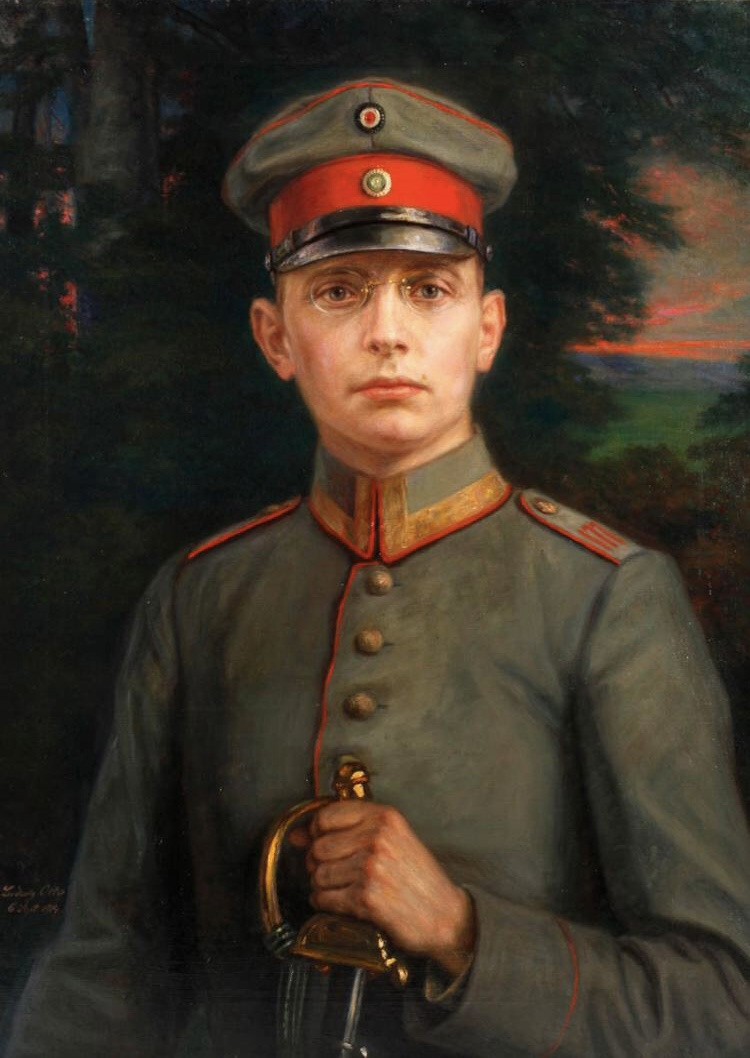
Portrait by Otto of Fähnrich Carl Christian Steglich, 1914

Louis Eugen Friedrich Otto (21 July 1850 — 15 May 1920), known as Ludwig Otto, was a German landscape and court painter, etcher, and lithographer.

Born at Borna, near Leipzig, in the Kingdom of Saxony, in 1865 he was admitted as a student to the Academy Leipzig and from 1868 to 1870 continued his education at the Dresden Academy under Franz Theodor Grosse, before studying etching with Karl Köpping in Berlin. In 1871 the German Empire was created, giving Otto a new and wider-reaching citizenship. He spent some fifteen years in Italy, Greece, and England, documenting the finds of archaeological expeditions, and gaining international recognition as a scientific illustrator and landscape painter; he also worked as a court painter to the Saxon royal family.

Otto married Marie Rüdiger, daughter of a pastor of Großdrebnitz, a village he regularly visited to paint. One of his paintings survives there in the Martinskirche.

In May to October 1906, Otto’s work was exhibited at the Sächsische Kunstausstellung, a major exhibition in Dresden on the Brühlesche Terrasse.

He was appointed a professor and also designed stained glass windows and other interior features for churches.

Otto died in 1920 in Dresden, by then in the Weimar Republic.
