= Dürrröhrsdorf-Dittersbach =

- Municipality
- Coat of arms

- Location of Dürrröhrsdorf-Dittersbach within Sächsische Schweiz-Osterzgebirge district
- Interactive map of Dürrröhrsdorf-Dittersbach
- Location within Germany Location within Saxony
- Coordinates: 51°2′N 14°0′E
- Country: Germany
- State: Saxony
- District: Sächsische Schweiz-Osterzgebirge

Government
  - Mayor (2022–29): Michael Steglich

Area
  - Total: 43.52 km^{2} (16.80 sq mi)
- Elevation: 240 m (790 ft)

Population (2025-12-31)
  - Total: 4,226
  - Density: 97.10/km^{2} (251.5/sq mi)
- Time zone: UTC+01:00 (CET)
  - Summer (DST): UTC+02:00 (CEST)
- Postal codes: 01833
- Dialling codes: 035026
- Vehicle registration: PIR
- Website: www.duerrroehrsdorf-dittersbach.de

Dürrröhrsdorf-Dittersbach (German pronunciation: [ˈdʏɐ̯ʁøːɐ̯sˌdɔʁf ˈdɪtɐsˌbax]) is a municipality in the district of Sächsische Schweiz-Osterzgebirge, Saxony, Germany. It is located on the river Wesenitz, 6 km west of Stolpen, 9 km northeast of Pirna and 18 km east of Dresden.

== Subdivisions ==
- Dittersbach
- Dobra
- Dürrröhrsdorf
- Elbersdorf
- Porschendorf
- Stürza
- Wilschdorf
- Wünschendorf

== Main sights ==
- The Belvedere on the Schöne Höhe hill, a tower decorated with frescoes by painter Carl Gottlieb Peschel after works of Johann Wolfgang Goethe. Founded by Johann Gottlob von Quandt (1787–1859), it includes a local history exhibition.
- Dittersbacher Jahrmarkt
