= Karl Völker =

German architect & painter (1889–1962)

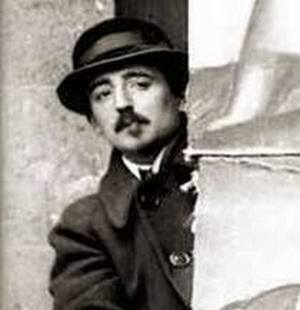
Karl Völker

Karl Völker (17 October 1889 – 28 December 1962) was a German architect and painter associated with the New Objectivity movement.

He was born in Halle, Saxony-Anhalt. After an apprenticeship as an interior decorator from 1904 to 1910, he studied from1912–1913 at the Dresden School of Arts and Crafts where Richard Guhr was his teacher. His first solo exhibition was in 1918 at the Halle Kunstverein.

Völker was the director of the Halle Artists Group, founded in 1919 and associated with the Berlin November Group. In the early years of the Weimar Republic he contributed many articles and prints to newspapers of the KPD (Communist Party of Germany).

He joined the Berlin "Red Group" in 1924 and was a contributor to the journal Das Wort. His early paintings, such as Industriebild (Industrial Picture, 1923) are in a constructivist style. His painting Railroad Station (1924) celebrates both the station—newly built by Halle's KPD government—and the unity of the mass workers descending the stairs.

He worked as an architect until 1933, when Hitler took power. Declared a degenerate artist by the Nazis, he was forced to support himself from 1933 to 1943 performing architectural conservation work.

After military service in World War II he resumed working as an architect and painter. In 1949 he had a retrospective exhibition at the Moritzburgmuseum in Halle. He died in Halle in 1962.
