= Roth Industries =

German company

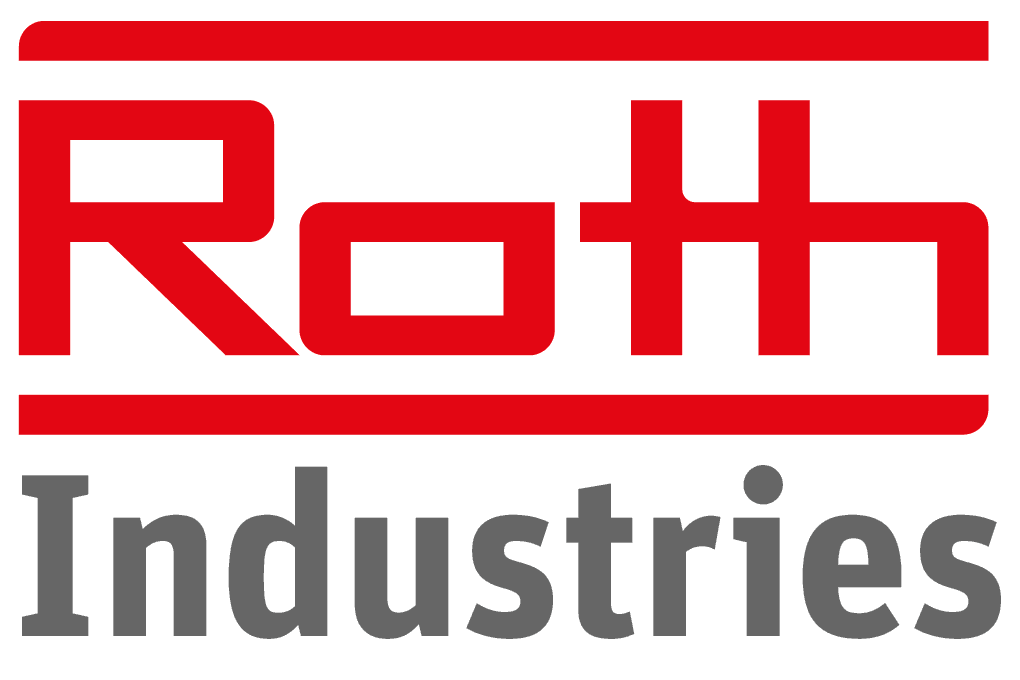
- Type: GmbH & Co. KG
- Industry: Energy and sanitary systems
- Founded: 1947
- Founders: Heinrich Roth
- Headquarters: Buchenau, Dautphetal, Germany
- Key people: Christin Roth-Jäger (chairman); Anne-Kathrin Roth; Claus-Hinrich Roth; Marcus Schmidt
- Revenue: €330.3 mio. (2024)
- Number of employees: 1,250 (2024)
- Website: roth-industries.com

The Roth Industries GmbH & Co. KG is an internationally active company headquartered in Dautphetal.

The company produces energy and sanitary systems as well as storage technology and plastic products. In addition, it operates in the field of machinery and equipment construction.

== History ==
The company was founded in 1947 by Heinrich Roth as a craft business (manufacturing wash boiler stoves and garden slab plates). Under Manfred Roth (1939–2025), the founder's son, the company developed into an internationally active group of companies with locations in Europe, North and South America and China from 1962 onwards. In addition, the company expanded its business activities in the 1960s under Manfred Roth's leadership into the field of heating and sanitary technology, producing, for example, heating oil tanks.

Due to the susceptibility of steel tanks to corrosion when storing heating oil, the company decided to enter the field of plastics technology (large blow-molding technology for storage systems for fuels and biofuels) in 1970. Roth Industries also expanded the sanitary segment with the development of complete shower cabins. In 1977, the company Schlesinger, a manufacturer of machinery for brush and broom production, was integrated into the group. The following year, the Roth Werke GmbH was founded.

In the 1980s, the company began offering energy systems such as underfloor heating systems. In 1989, Roth Industries acquired Bolenz & Schäfer, a company active in the fields of hydraulics and filament winding, as well as the company EHA, which was active in special-purpose machinery for coating and impregnation processes involving web-based materials.

In the 1990s, Roth Industries invested in the development of hydraulic pumps. In 1992, Roth Industries established another site in Bischofswerda. At the end of the 1990s, the market for oil tanks collapsed, prompting restructuring measures within the company. For example, the sites in the east of Saxony, in operation since the early 1990s, were converted to the production of environmental technology (such as rainwater and wastewater systems) for industrial and agricultural applications.

In the 2000s, the company increasingly expanded abroad; in 2016, the company underwent a restructuring that consolidated its business segments in the areas of building and industrial technology. As part of this process, the subsidiaries were aligned with the Roth brand name: Roth Kunststofftechnik was renamed Roth Plastic Technology, the companies Schlesinger and EHA were merged to form Roth Composite Machinery, and Bolenz & Schäfer was renamed Roth Hydraulics.

In 2022, Roth Industries celebrated its 75th anniversary. The company also announced in 2022 that it would increase the number of apprenticeship positions for 2023 by around ten percent.

In October 2023, Roth Plastic Technology launched a new division for plastic- and injection-moulding-compatible design and development. At the end of 2023, it was also announced that Christin Roth-Jäger would take over the management of the corporate group from Matthias Donges.

In 2024, Roth Hydraulics acquired the company SFP Hydraulics, based in Houston, which manufactures bladder, piston and diaphragm accumulators. In January 2025, Manfred Roth passed away at the age of 85.

== Corporate structure and locations ==
Roth Industries operates several sites in Germany, including in Buchenau, Wolfgruben, Eckelshausen, and Bischofswerda. The company is 100 percent family-owned by the Roth family. As of 2023, the group maintains 28 companies for production and sales.

Roth Industries is the parent company of the Roth Group. The company operates the following subsidiaries in Germany, among others:

- Roth Werke GmbH, Dautphetal
- Roth Composite Machinery GmbH, Steffenberg
- Roth Hydraulics GmbH, Biedenkopf
- Roth Plastic Technology (branch of Roth Werke GmbH), Dautphetal
- Becker Plastics GmbH, Datteln
- Roth Services GmbH, Dautphetal
- Roth Umwelttechnik, Bischofswerda

In addition, the group operates further subsidiaries internationally, which adapt their production to the needs of the respective country. For example, storage systems for drinking and heating water and storage systems for rainwater and wastewater treatment and seawater desalination are produced in Spain. In the United States, mainly heating oil tanks are produced. In Europe, production activities primarily involve radiant heating systems for floors and ceilings. As of 2023, one in four Roth products is manufactured abroad.

In the 2024 fiscal year, the group generated revenue of €330.3 million and employed 1,250 people. The apprenticeship rate was ten percent in 2020, with around 90 percent of trainees being taken on permanently.

== Companies of the Roth Industries Group and products ==
The business activities of Roth Industries and its subsidiaries are the development, manufacturing, and distribution of products in the building and industrial sectors. These include the divisions energy systems, sanitary systems and environmental systems, as well as composite technology, plastics, and hydraulics.

- Roth Werke GmbH, headquartered in Dautphetal, operates in the field of building technology and produces and distributes products for energy generation, storage and distribution, as well as piping systems and sanitary systems. This includes heat pumps, radiant heating and cooling systems, piping systems and additional plastic products. For the storage of heating oil, plastic tanks with steel or plastic casings are produced. In the field of environmental technology, the company develops solar systems and, since 2023, has also offered heating oil tanks suitable for green fuels (such as hydrotreated vegetable oils, hydrogenated used oils or Fischer–Tropsch process).
- Roth Composite Machinery is responsible for the composite technology division within the industrial sector. The company is active in special-purpose machinery in the product areas Filament Winding & Prepreg, Pleating & Coating, and Brushes & Brooms. The company develops automation concepts for fibre changes or machinery for winding processes, as well as products for impregnation processes, for example using hot-melt adhesive.
- Roth Hydraulics develops, manufactures and distributes accumulator systems (piston-, bladder- and diaphragm accumulators) as well as special-purpose machinery. The company's accumulator systems are used, for example, in industrial applications, amusement rides, theatre and musical productions, or in offshore wind farms.
- Roth Plastic Technology and Becker Plastics operate in the division responsible for the manufacturing and distribution of plastic systems, primarily plastic pipes. The pipes manufactured by the companies are used in building technology. Becker Plastics develops, for example, aluminium-coated pipes made of polypropylene or polyethylene, which are used in water supply and heating installation. It operates in the field of injection moulding and also offers production testing services for tool and mould manufacturers.
- Roth Umwelttechnik manufactures plastic containers and storage systems for water and wastewater, such as drinking water tanks and biological treatment systems. The plastic tanks are offered with capacities of up to 10,000 litres. Containers for hazardous materials are also part of the product range. In 2016, a blow-moulding system for plastic components and containers was purchased. The company was founded in 1991 and is headquartered in Bischofswerda.
- Roth Services provides services for the companies of the corporate group, including finance and accounting, human resources, and the administration of the group's shareholdings.

== Social engagement ==
The company regularly organises a Training Day. During the COVID-19 pandemic, Roth Industries donated face masks to nursing homes, care facilities and outpatient care services in the region. Roth Industries is a founder and sponsor of the childcare centre Rothkehlchen in Buchenau, which also offers spots for the children of the company's employees. The company also supports the Protestant kindergarten in Buchenau.

In 2024, the Manfred-Roth-Stiftung was established. The foundation aims to address social concerns in the region and supports a variety of institutions.

== Awards ==
In 2018, Roth Industries was honoured as a finalist by the Oskar-Patzelt-Stiftung (Oskar Patzelt Foundation) with the Großer Preis des Mittelstandes (Grand Prix for Medium-Sized Enterprises). In 2022, the company was one of the finalists in the Jobmotor category of the Hessen Champions awards, which recognise the creation of jobs and training positions.
