= Johann Gottlob von Quandt =

German art collector and artist (1787–1859)

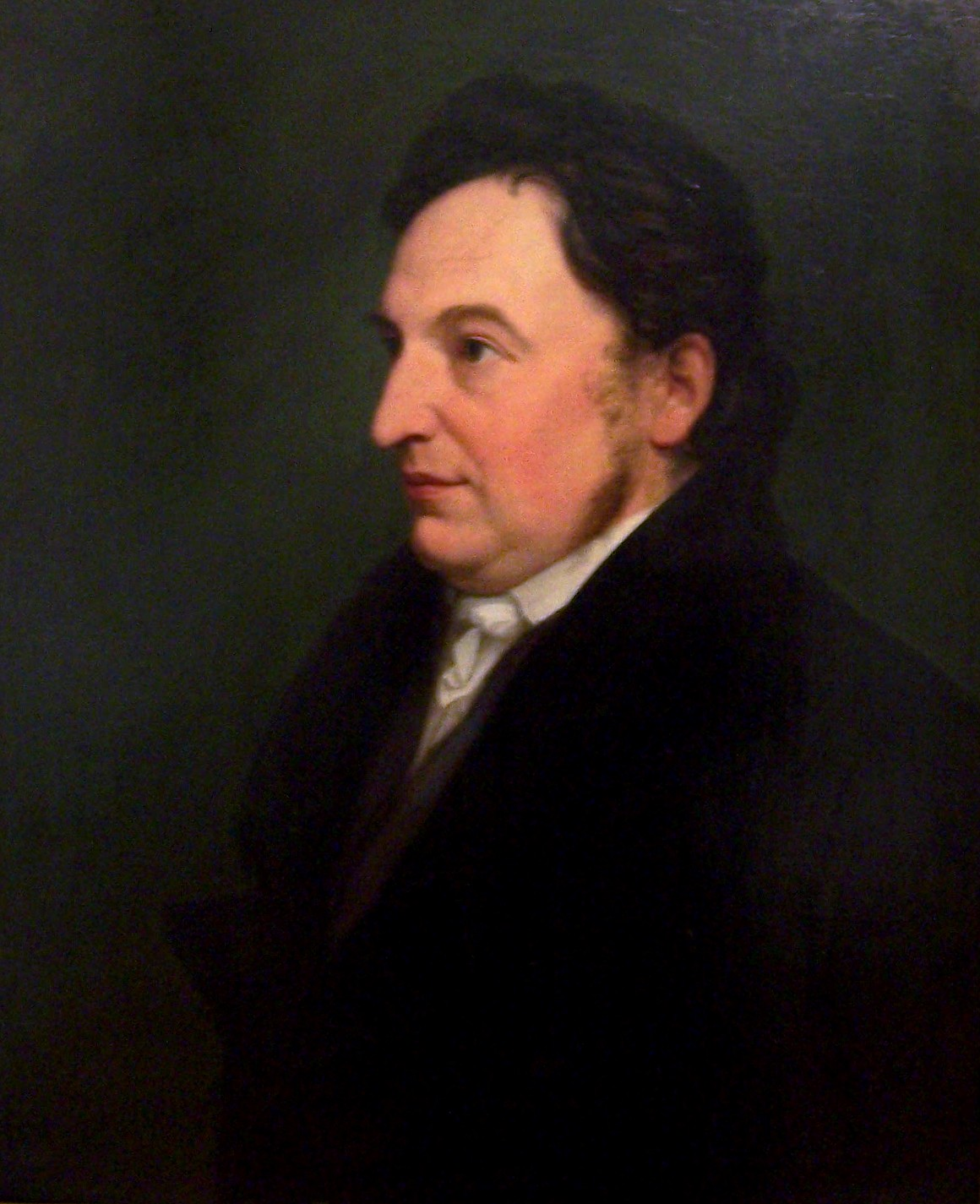
Portrait of Johann Gottlob von Quandt, oil on canvas, by Carl Christian Vogel von Vogelstein, c. 1830.

Johann Gottlob von Quandt (9 April 1787 – 19 June 1859) was a German artist, art scholar, and collector.

== Biography ==
Von Quandt was born in Leipzig. He had met and corresponded with Goethe.

Some of his own works are exhibited in the Tower of Fresken at the town of Dürrröhrsdorf-Dittersbach, near Dresden. He died in Dresden.

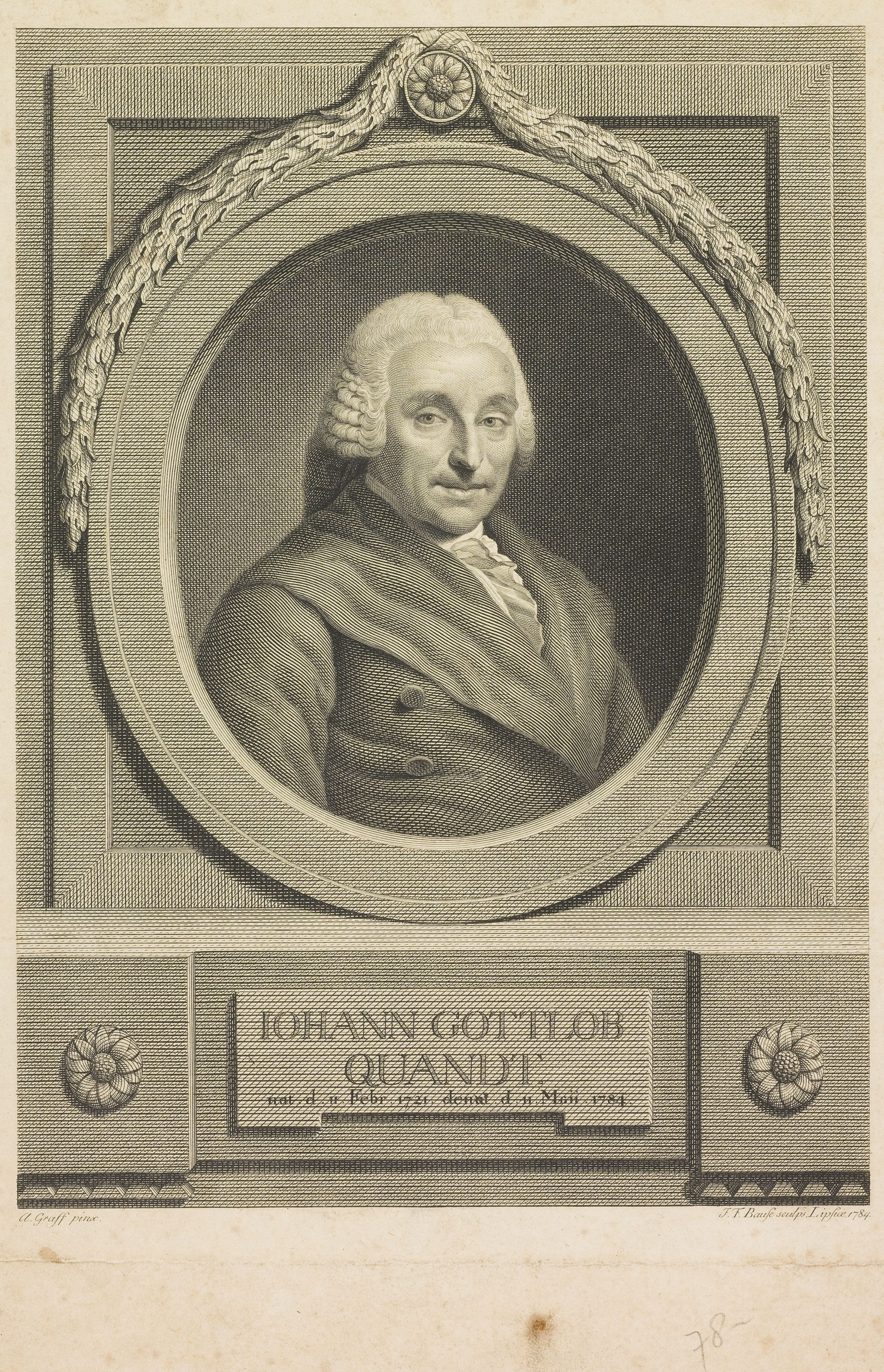
Johann Gottlob von Quandt

Gottlob von Quandt never received any formal education. He did, however, study under people like Johann Friedrich Rochlitz, C. de Renty, and Julius Schnorr von Carolsfeld. Gottlob von Quandt once rescued eleven pictures of Leipzig's Nicolai Church, some of which were the creations of Lucas Cranach the Elder. This notable act earned him the respect of Goethe. The rescue work also served as the stepping stone for him into a career of art historian and collector of old German paintings. He earned a high standing in the art world of his time, and his home in Rome was a meeting place for artists such as Johann Friedrich Overbeck, Julius Schnorr von Carolsfeld, Louise Seidler, and Bertel Thorvaldsen. Later, he left Rome for Dresden, where he spent the last part of his life. There, he turned his house into a kind of museum and a learning center for artists where they could work and study.

The house also became a center from which von Quandt started his campaign for the promotion of the art of the Nazarenes. He contributed immensely toward this end, taking the Nazarenes art to the general public, increasing recognition of the work. As an art collector, von Quandt differed from other collectors in that he always allowed artists to choose their own subjects. He was a savior for the poor, as besides promoting art, he helped many youth from rural backgrounds to pursue studies.
