= Bischofswerda =

- Town
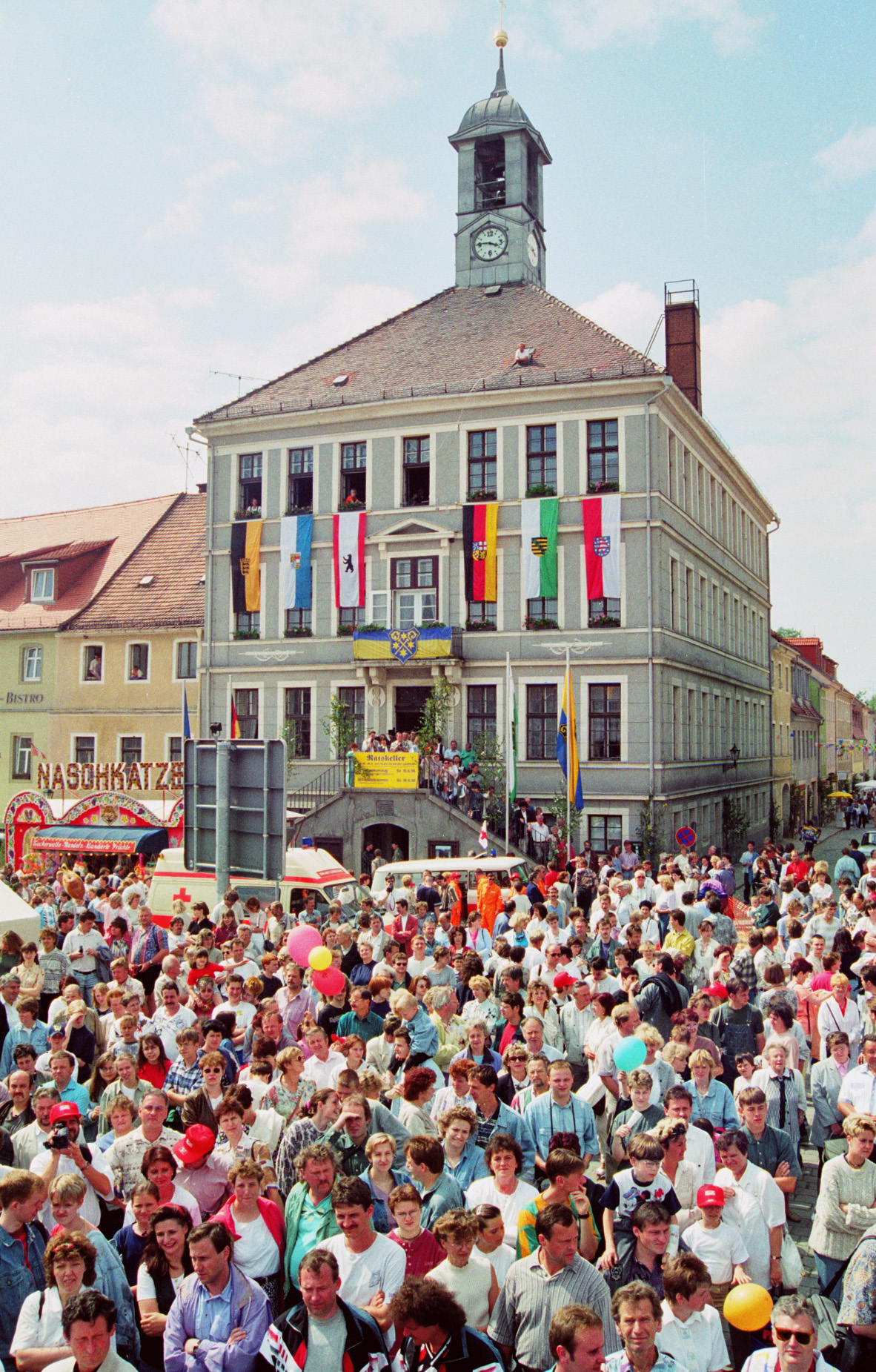

- Coat of arms

- Location of Bischofswerda within Bautzen district
- Interactive map of Bischofswerda
- Location within Germany Location within Saxony
- Coordinates: 51°7′39″N 14°10′47″E
- Country: Germany
- State: Saxony
- District: Bautzen

Government
  - Mayor (2022–29): Holm Große (Ind.)

Area
  - Total: 46.21 km^{2} (17.84 sq mi)
- Elevation: 304 m (997 ft)

Population (2025-12-31)
  - Total: 10,519
  - Density: 227.6/km^{2} (589.6/sq mi)
- Time zone: UTC+01:00 (CET)
  - Summer (DST): UTC+02:00 (CEST)
- Postal codes: 01877
- Dialling codes: 03594
- Vehicle registration: BZ, BIW, HY, KM
- Website: www.bischofswerda.de

Bischofswerda (German: [bɪʃɔfsˈvɛʁda]; Upper Sorbian: Biskopicy) is a small town in eastern Germany at the western edge of Upper Lusatia in Saxony.

== Geography ==
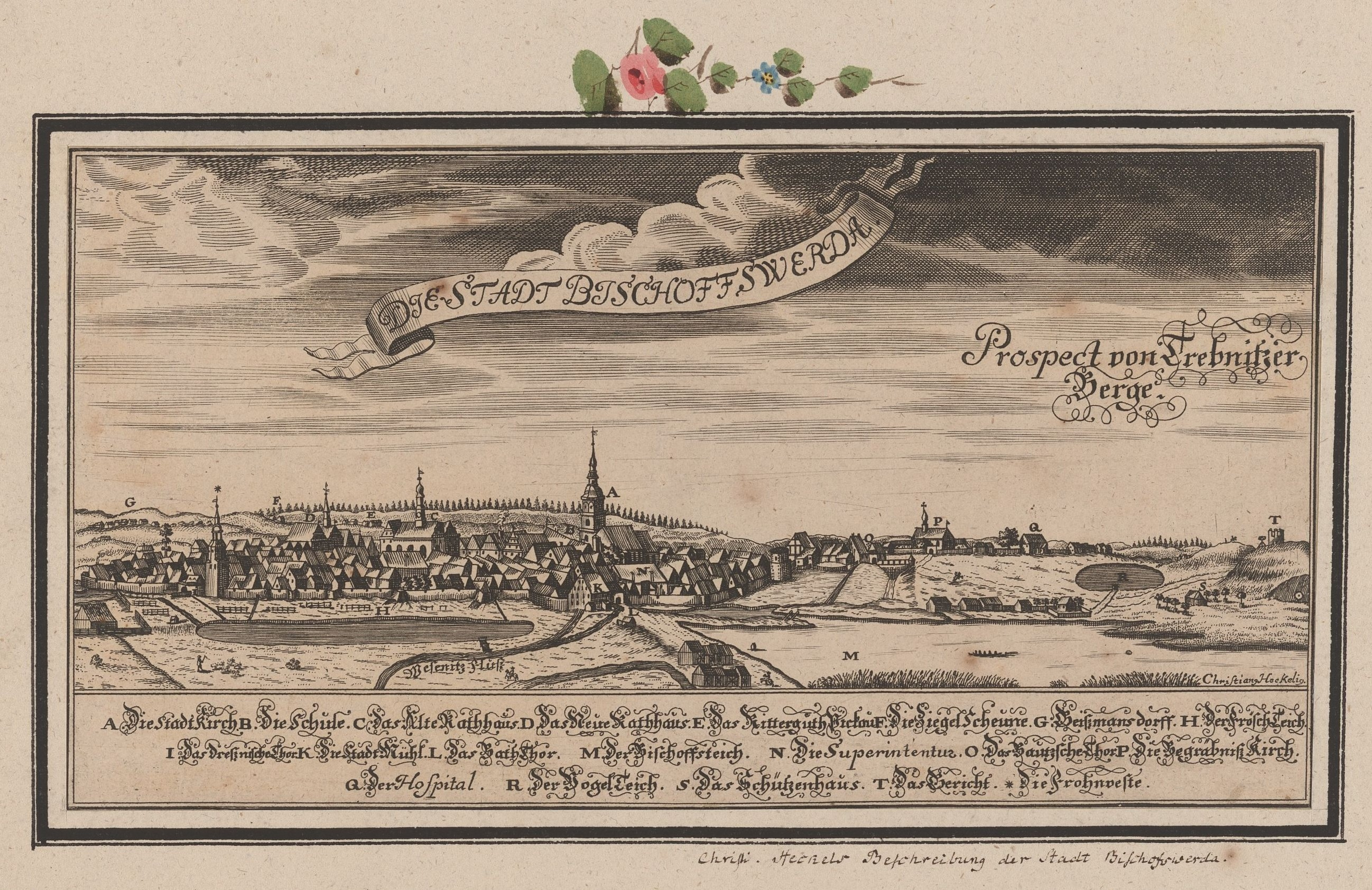
Historical view, about 1713

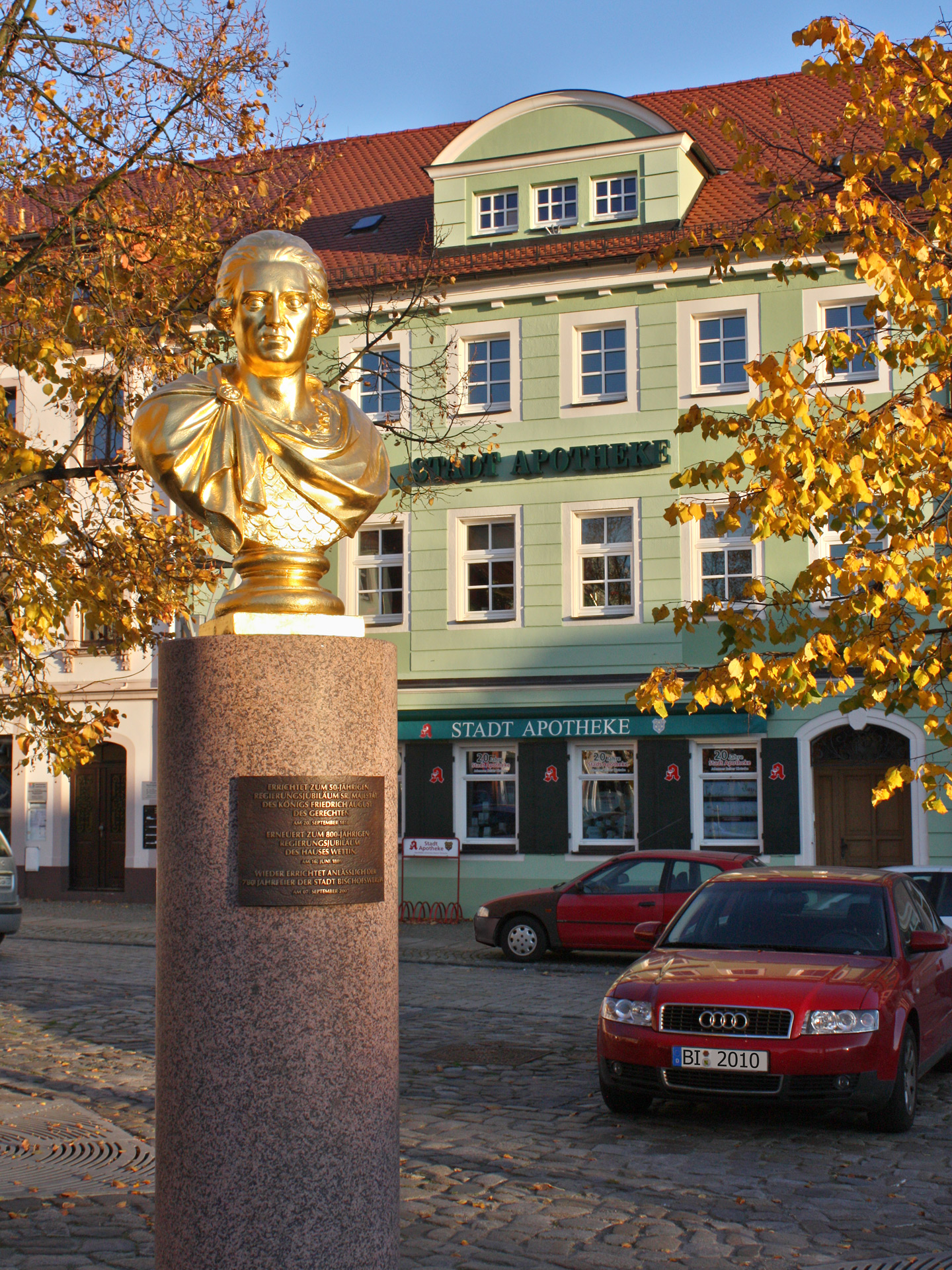
Memorial to Frederick Augustus I of Saxony

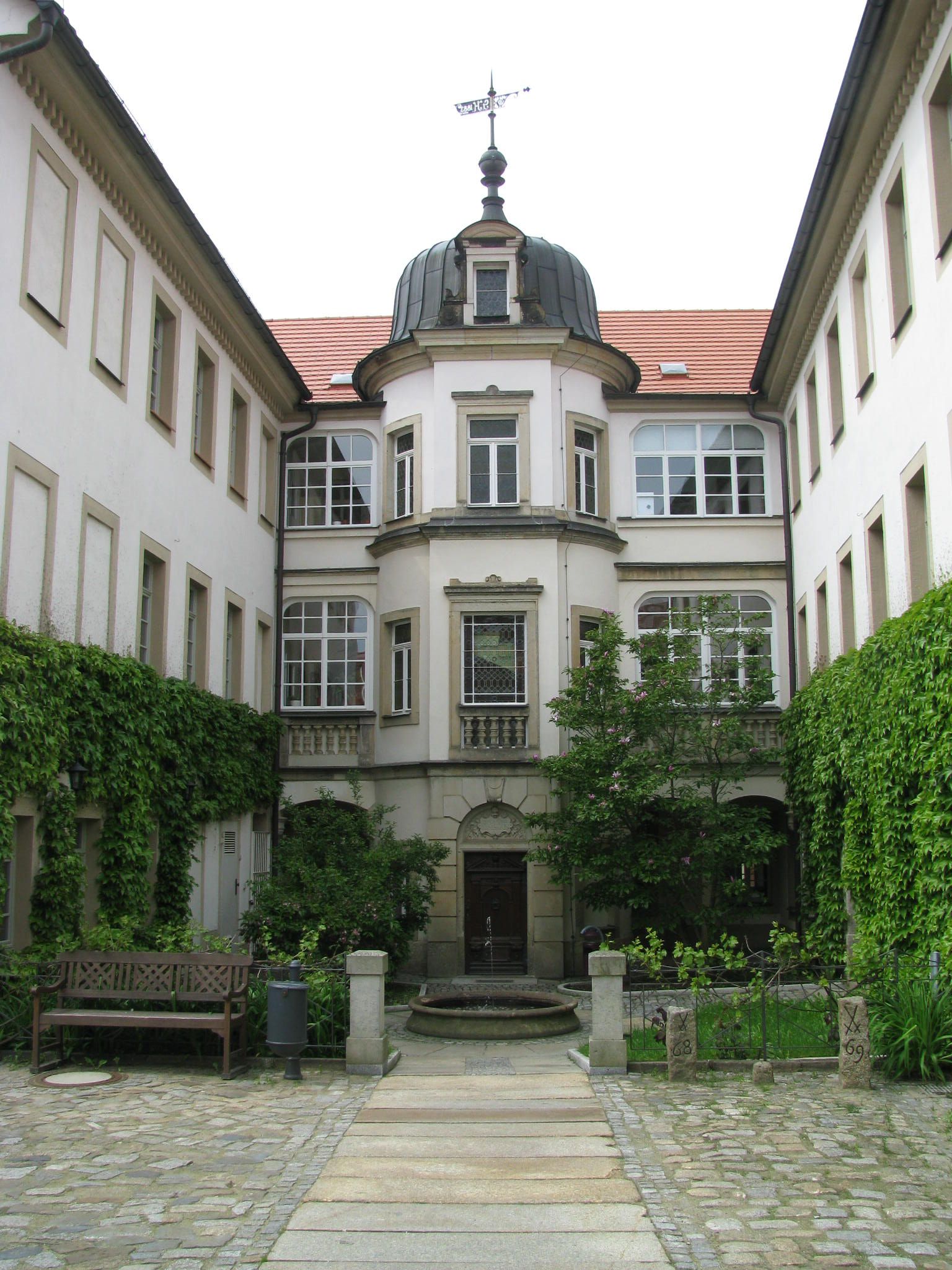
Bischofssitz

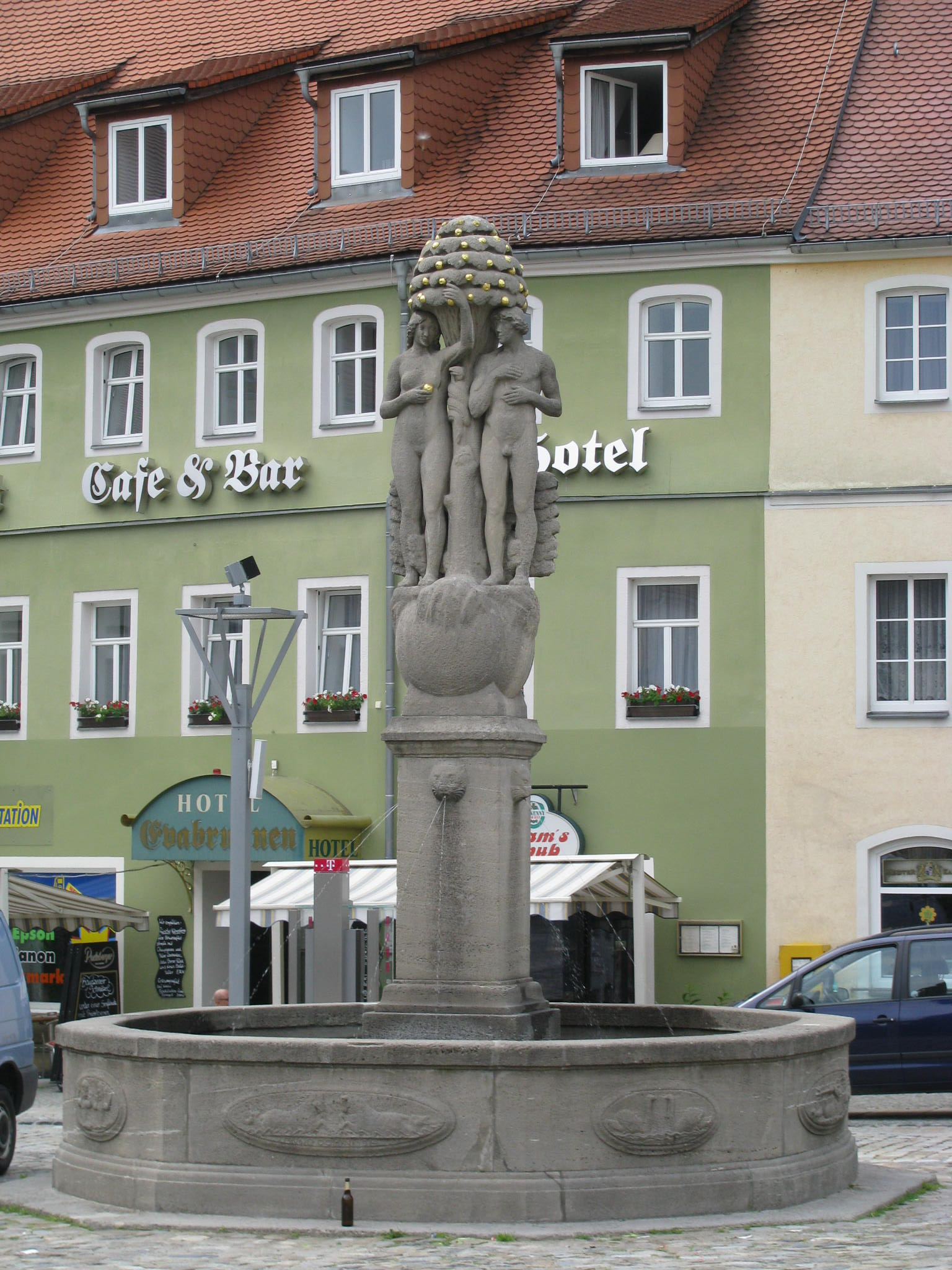
Paradise Fountain (Paradiesbrunnen)

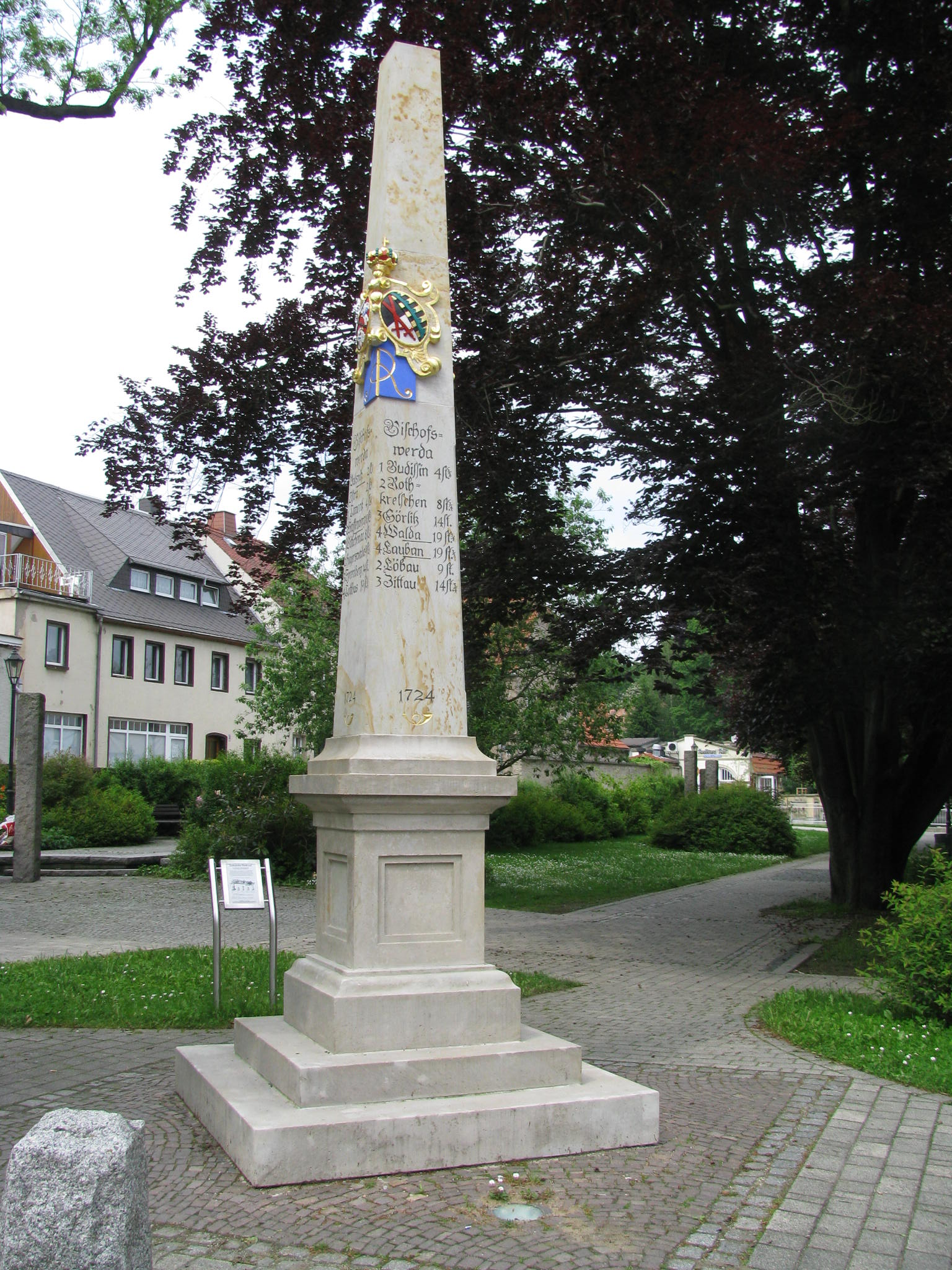
Saxon post milestone

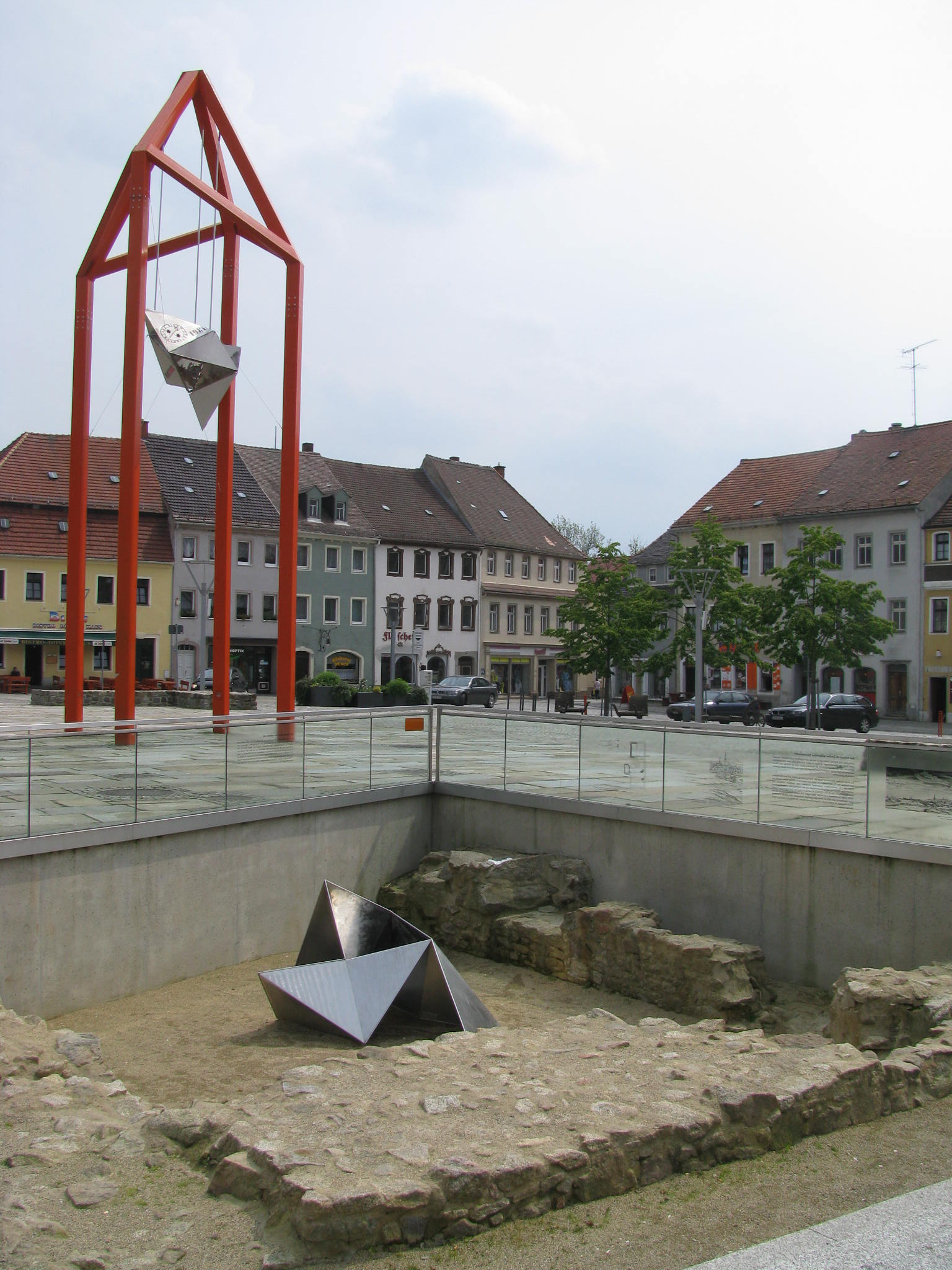
Modern sculpture on the market place, in front the location of the former town hall

The town is located 33 km to the east of Dresden at the edge of the Upper Lusatian mountain country. The town is known as the "Gateway to Upper Lusatia" – "Tor zur Oberlausitz" in German. Located in the district of Bautzen, the town is 18 km west of Bautzen itself. Großdrebnitz is among its quarters. The river Wesenitz flows through the town.

== History ==
The first documentary evidence of the existence of Bischofswerda dates from 1227. Nominally the town was founded by the Bishops of Meissen, though it may have existed before that point. In 1288 city walls were constructed. The first mention of Bischofswerda as a city is in a document dating from 1361. The town remained under the authority of the Bishops of Meissen until 1559 when power was transferred to Augustus, Elector of Saxony, who introduced Protestantism. The city arms are based on a 14th-century seal and consist of two crossed bishop's croziers and four stars. The significance of the stars is not known. One of two main routes connecting Warsaw and Dresden ran through the town in the 18th century and Kings Augustus II the Strong and Augustus III of Poland often traveled that route.

Like many late medieval towns, Bischofswerda suffered from periodic fires that damaged the town. Fires are recorded in 1429, 1469, 1528, 1583, 1596, 1641, 1671 and 1813. The last fire was the worst. During the War of the Sixth Coalition, Napoleonic forces had occupied Bischofswerda when a fire broke out within the town walls on 12 May 1813, destroying most of the medieval town. However the town was rebuilt on an order of Frederick Augustus I of Saxony in a manner closely following the earlier layout, and this remains to this day.

During the increased tensions of the 1980s between the Western democracies and the Eastern Communist Bloc, Bischofswerda became a base for Soviet SS-12 nuclear missiles. A depot for the missiles and their launchers was built just outside town. The missiles were withdrawn in 1988.

The following table indicates Bischofwerda's population at different times:

- 1834 – 2 434
- 1880 – 4 778
- 1960 – 11 350
- 2004 – 13 104
- 2005 – 12 962
- 2006 – 12 732

Source from 2000: Statistisches Landesamt Sachsen (Saxony Office of Statistics)

== Sights ==
Among the most impressive buildings are the town hall and the Christuskirche. Both are examples of neo-classical architecture and were designed by Gottlob Friedrich Thormeyer. The town hall (Rathaus) was constructed in 1818, just off the Altmarkt, the centre of the town. The entrance to the Christuskirche is decorated by a mosaic by Josef Goller. In the interior one can find a painting by Osmar Schindler, who grew up in the town. The Catholic church is named after Saint Benno of Meissen, who is said to have founded Bischofswerda in the 11th century.

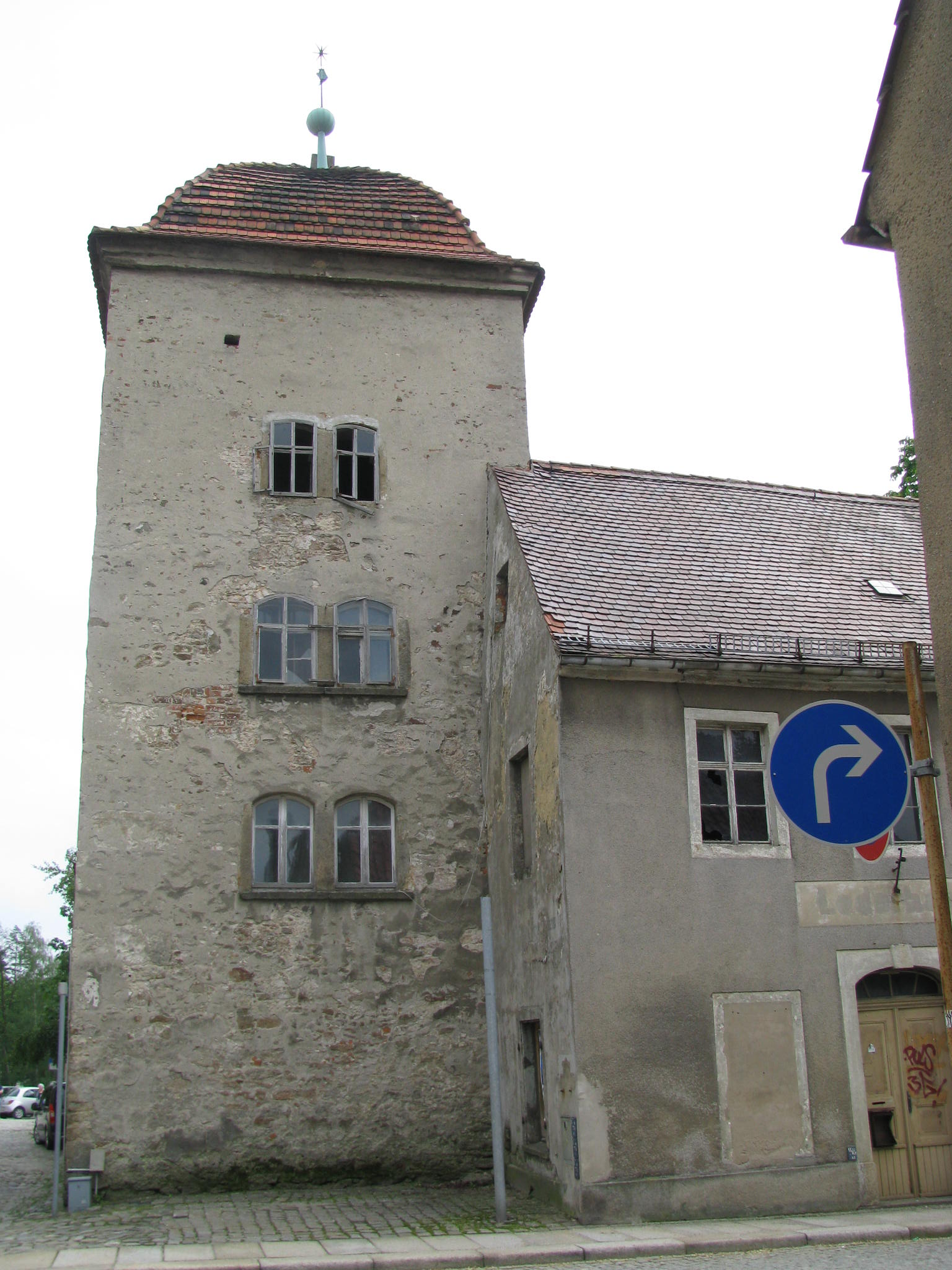
Historical Fronfeste (built 1286), entrance at the medieval town wall

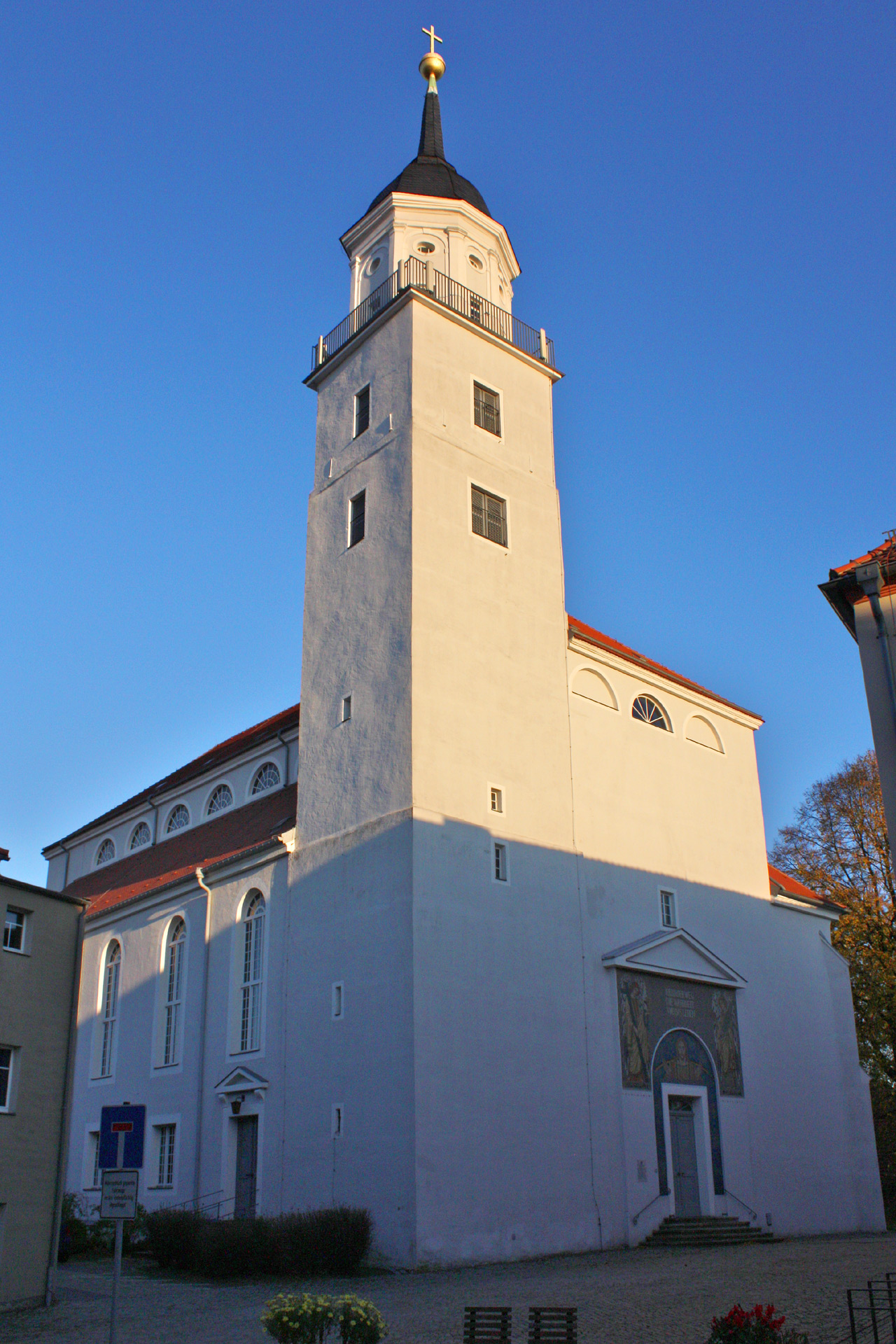
Christuskirche by Gottlob Friedrich Thormeyer

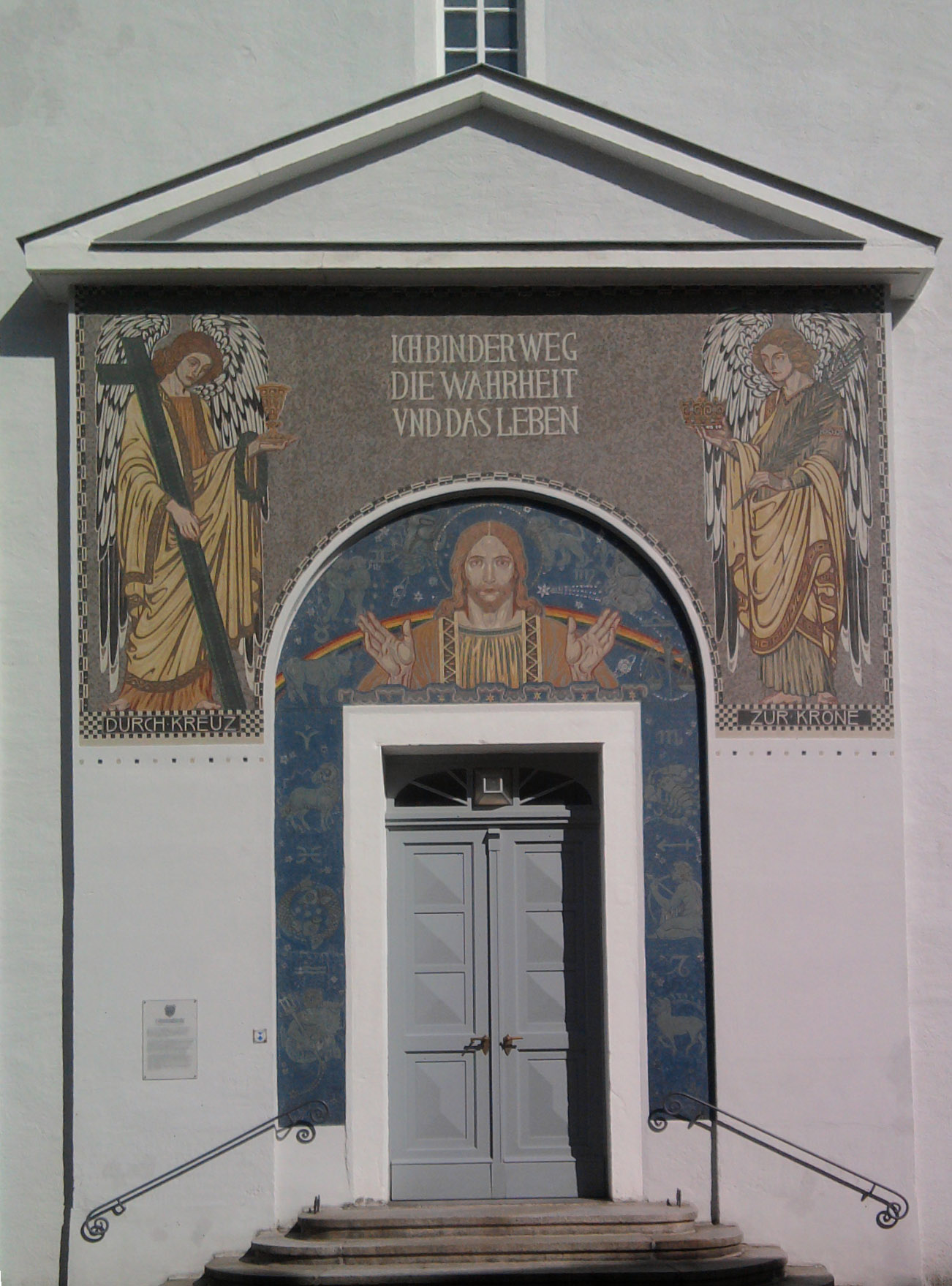
Mosaic at the entrance of Christuskirche (by Josef Goller and Villeroy & Boch)

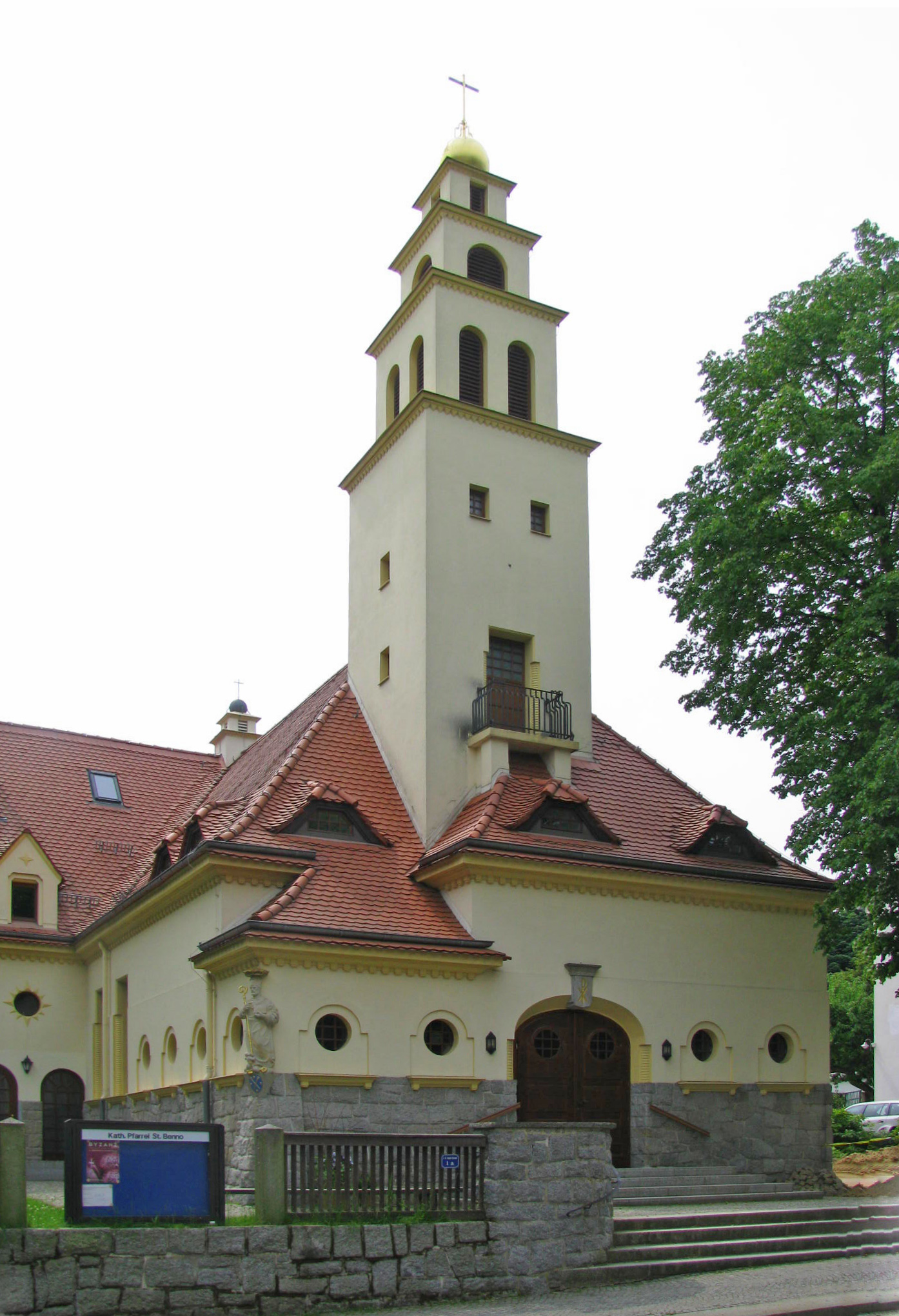
Catholic church St. Benno

== Economy and transport ==
Before the reunification of Germany in 1990, Bischofswerda was a significant industrial location. The company Fortschritt produced agricultural machines. This manufacture as well as the glass fabrication has closed. The textile industry had a centuries-long tradition in the town, but also ended in 2012.

New industries began to settle in Bischofswerda in recent years. Roth Industries, a German enterprise from the environmental technology sector, has a subsidiary here. The Canadian producer of solar cells, ARISE Technologies, came to the town, but has closed.

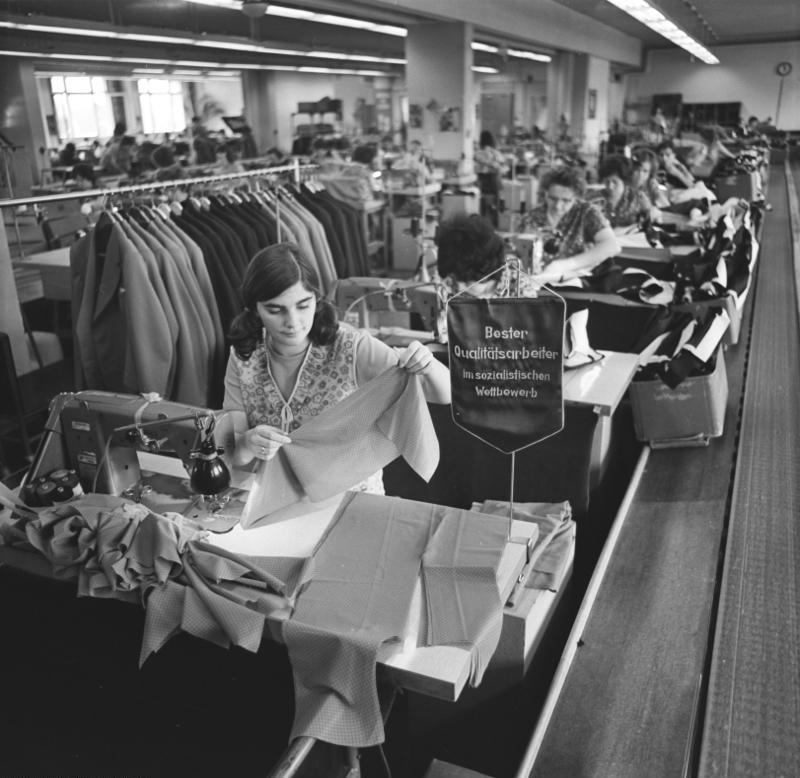
Textile industry in the G.D.R.

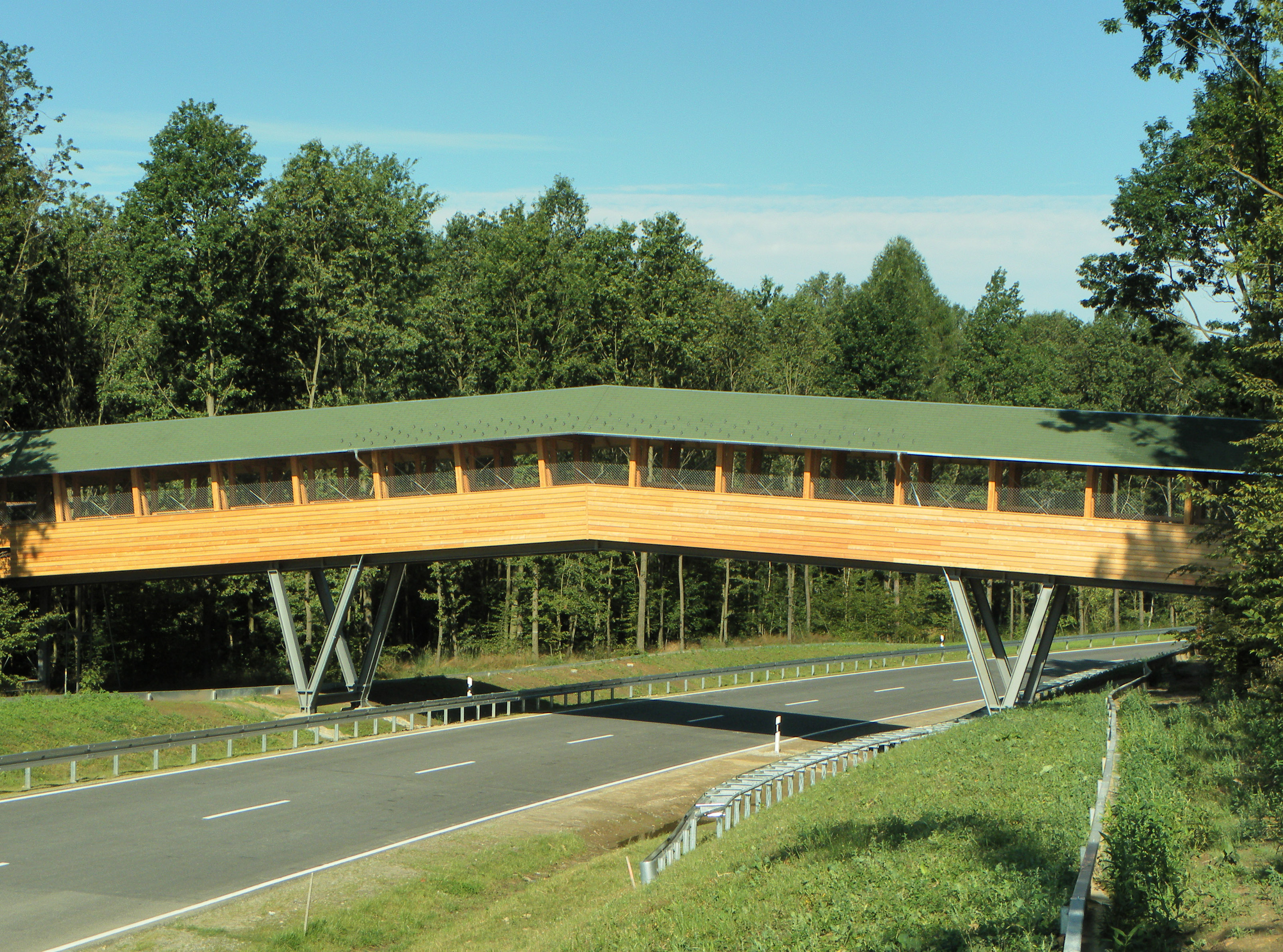
"Hazel Dormouse" bridge over the bypass road in the south-west of the town

The town is situated on the Bundesstraße 6, which connects Dresden and Görlitz at the Polish border. The Bundesautobahn 4 bypasses the town 6 km north, enabling easy access to Dresden Airport. The road traffic bypasses the town in the west. Via Bischofswerda railway station, direct access by rail is possible to Dresden, Görlitz, Zittau as well as to Czech Liberec.

== Culture and sports ==
The little town became known nationally when the local football club BSG Fortschritt Bischofswerda, sponsored by Fortschritt, twice reached the DDR-Oberliga, the highest football league in East Germany. Today, a modern open air bath and Saxony's littlest zoo can be noted. Regularly, the local festival Schiebocker Tage and a Karl May festival are organized.

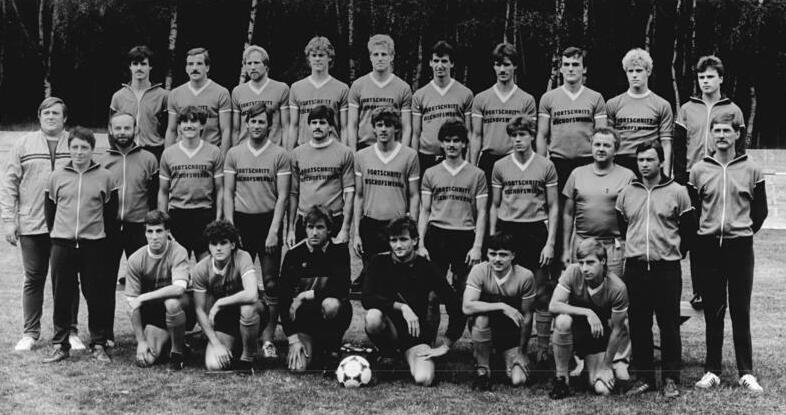
DDR-Oberliga team of Bischofswerda

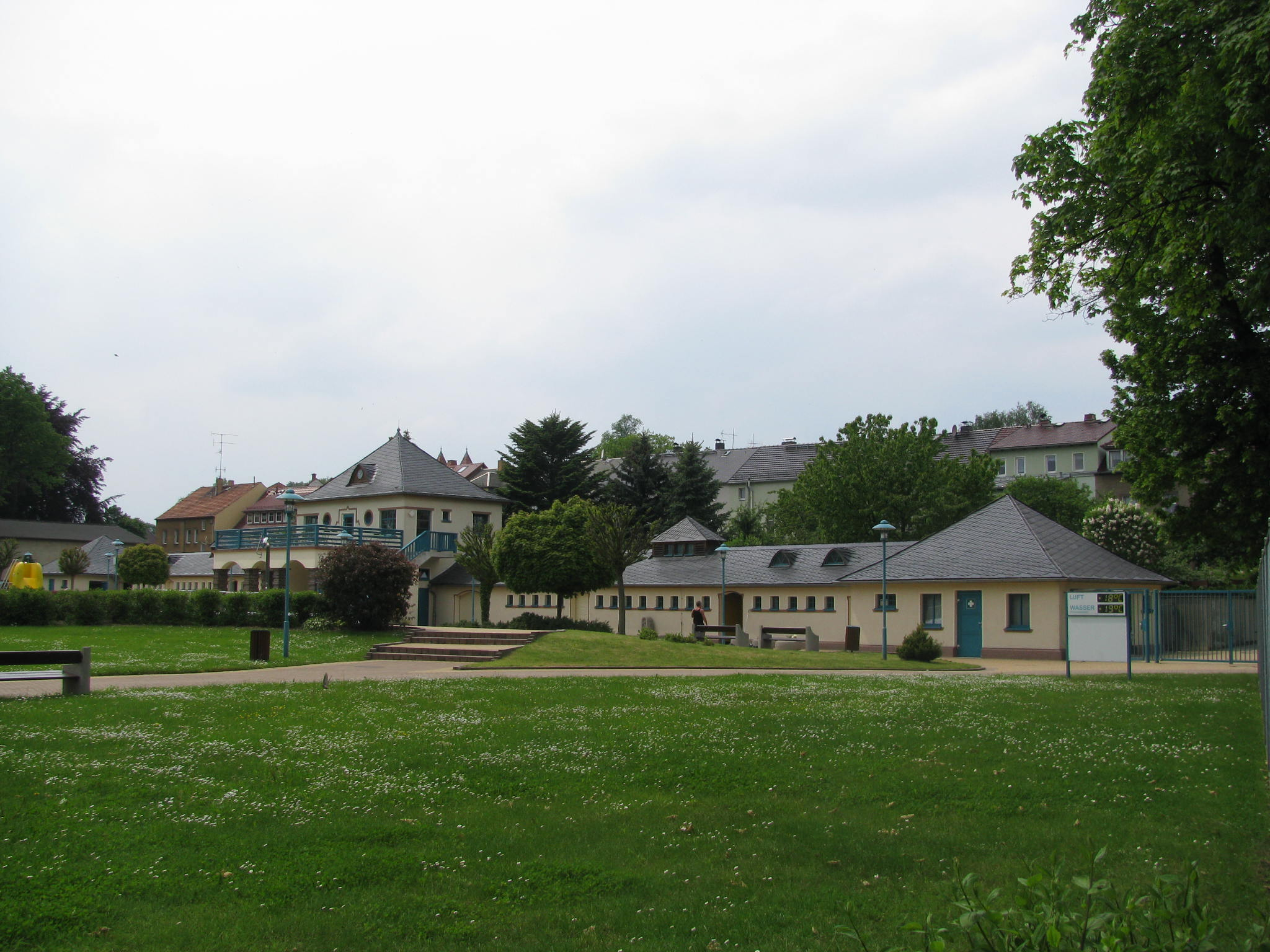
Open air bath

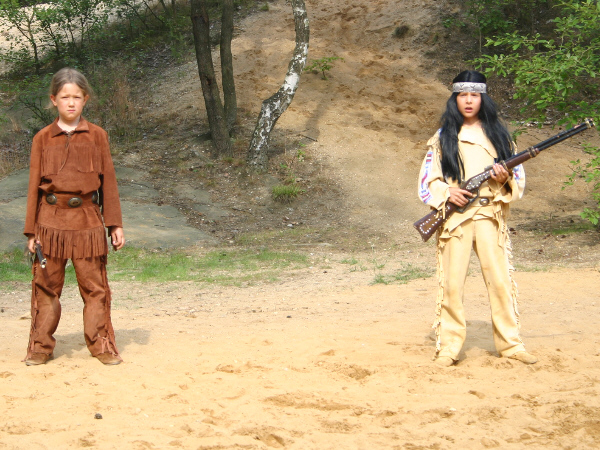
Karl May Festival

== Partnership ==
Bischofswerda is twin town of:

- Geislingen an der Steige, Germany
- Gryfów Śląski, Poland
- Raspenava, Czech Republic

Moreover, a long-term partnership exists between organizations for the disabled in Bischofswerda and Eggenfelden.

== Personality ==
=== Freemen ===
- 1891: Otto von Bismarck
- 1911: Heinrich Grafe (1857–1917), wine wholesalers, City Council Chairman and antisemitic Member of Reichstag 1893-1917

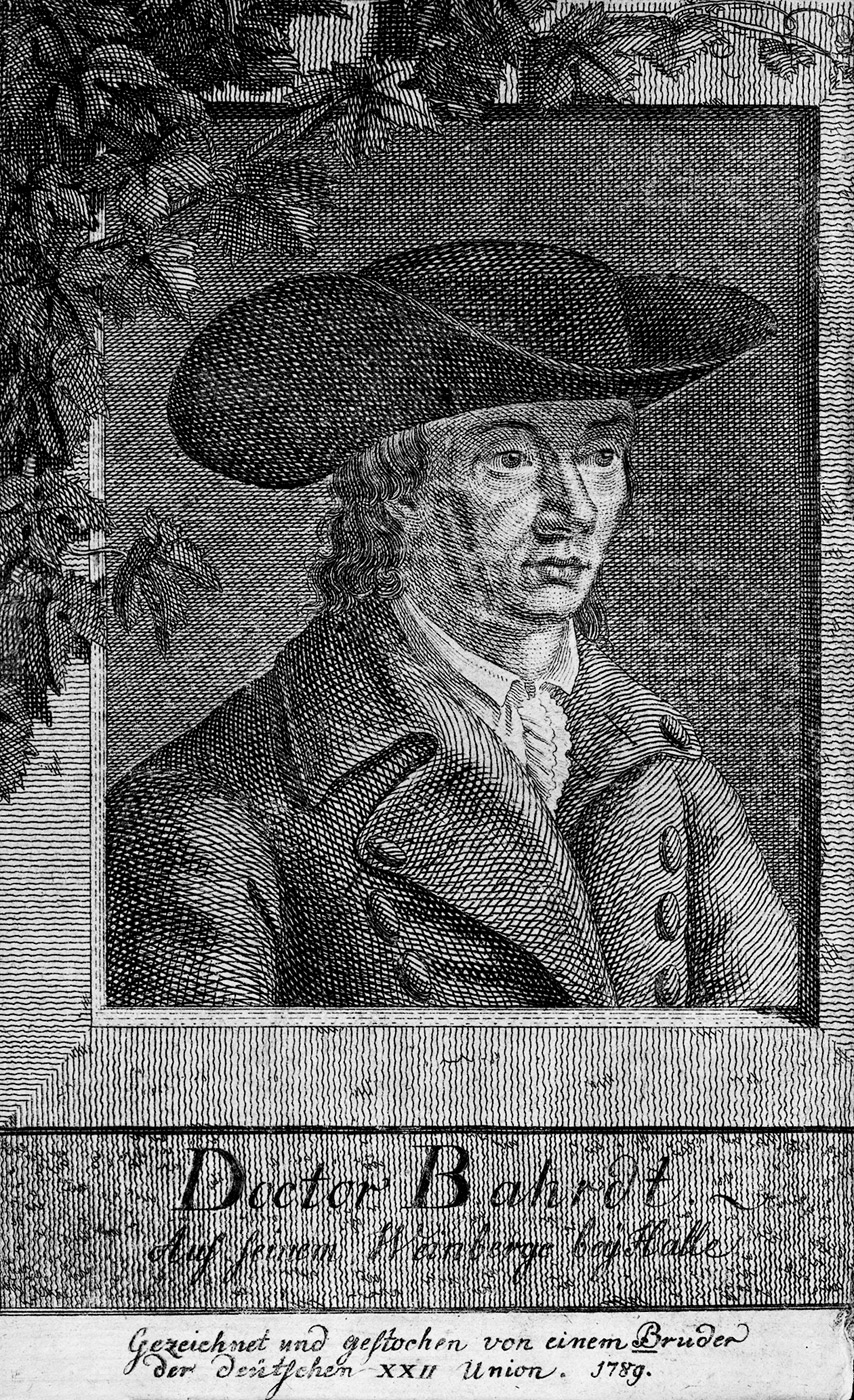
Karl Friedrich Bahrdt, 1789

=== Sons and daughters of the town ===
- Christian Heckel (1676–1744), teacher, organist, musician, poet and publisher
- Christian Adolph Klotz (1738–1771), philologist.
- Karl Friedrich Bahrdt (1741–1792), theologian and enlightener.
- Robert Heller (1812–1871), writer
- Walther Hesse (1846–1911), microbiologist
- Max Neumeister (1849–1929), born in Kleindrebnitz, director of the Tharandt Forestry Academy
- Johannes Pache (1857–1897), composer
- Oskar Ernst Bernhardt (1875–1941), German founder of the Grail, writer
- Arthur Biram (1878–1967), philologist and philosopher
- Günther Wyschofsky (born 1929), politician (SED), Minister for chemical industry in the GDR
- Adeltraut Thienel, (born 1943), actress, dressmaker, designer,

=== Personalities who are associated with the city ===
- Benno (1010–1106), bishop of Meissen
- Hanns Georgi (1901–1989), painter, director of a teacher training institute
