= Hanns Georgi =

- Born: Georgi Curt Johannes (Hans); 21 September 1901; Dresden, Germany.
- Died: 23 October 1989 (aged 88); Malschendorf, Germany
- Education: University of Leipzig
- Known for: Illustrator, painting & printmaking

Hanns Georgi (21 September 1901 – 23 October 1989) was a German painter, printmaker and book illustrator.

Grave Dr. Hanns Georgi

== Early life ==
Hanns Georgi was the youngest of five children of August Friedrich Wilhelm and Anna Georgi Georgi, Scharschmidt born in Dresden. In 1907 he attended the town school where he illustrated his early essays with pictures. His artistic talent was already recognized and encouraged by his teachers.

Later he attended the Fletscherschen Teacher Seminar (teacher-training seminary), in Dresden-Neustadt, between 1915 and 1922. During his training he met his mentor, the painter Osmar Schindler, who had him working in his studio, recommending that Georgi study art.

In 1921, while a teacher and artist, Georgi met his future wife, Elfriede Angels. He married her in 1929. He later had three children with her: Dieter (1932), Henry (1938) and Ulrich (1942).

== Professional career ==
By 1923, Georgi had his first major exhibition in Sebnitz, where he showed paintings, watercolors, drawings and etchings. In 1926, Georgi took part in the International Art Exhibition in Dresden, and a year later was a member of the German Association of Artists, where he remained until its dissolution in 1934 (coinciding with the redefining of German culture and art during the Third Reich).

From 1926 to 1931, while exhibiting, Georgi continued to further his studies as a teacher at the University of Leipzig in history, philosophy and pedagogy. In 1931 he graduated as Dr. Phil. at the Philosophical Faculty of the University of Leipzig.

From March 1931 until spring 1933, Georgi became a research assistant at the Pedagogical Institute of the Dresden University of Technology. From 1933 to 1939 he worked as a teacher in the town school in Sebnitz. In April 1933, Georgi joined the Nazi Party. In the following years, Georgi continued to take frequent trips to Sassnitz, Stettin and the Bohemian Highlands. However, by 1936 (under the Third Reich) he failed to obtain a teaching post.

In August 1938 he joined the war effort as a reserve artilleryman in Frankenberg. On 25 August 1939 Georgi was drafted for part of the German invasion of Poland, then later for the French campaign. From September 1940 he was again working as a teacher in Sebnitz. From 1941 to 1945 Georgi built a teacher training college in Bischofswerda. In 1945, during the last weeks of the war, he was serviced for Volkssturm. From 1945, after his dismissal from the teaching profession, Georgi worked as a freelance painter and graphic artist. 1947-1949 Georgi was in the jury of the city of Zwickau when the Max Pechstein Prize was launched.

In July 1948 the gallery in Henning Hall showed the first comprehensive exhibition of Georgi's oil paintings, watercolors and drawings. In the fifties, sixties and seventies Georgi reached the peak of his work as an illustrator.

== Later life ==
From 1948 to 1963 he worked in the community college in Sebnitz holding lectures on art history and literature. In 1952 Georgi became a member of the Association of Artists of the GDR. His wife Elfriede died 1961. He retired not long after but traveled a lot, purchasing many paintings from his travels. He often stayed with his three sons. By 1988 his health deteriorated. On 23 October 1989 Hanns Georgi died in the house of his son Henry in Malschendorf near Dresden.

== See also ==
- List of German painters
