= Großdrebnitz =

- Stadtteil of Bischofswerda
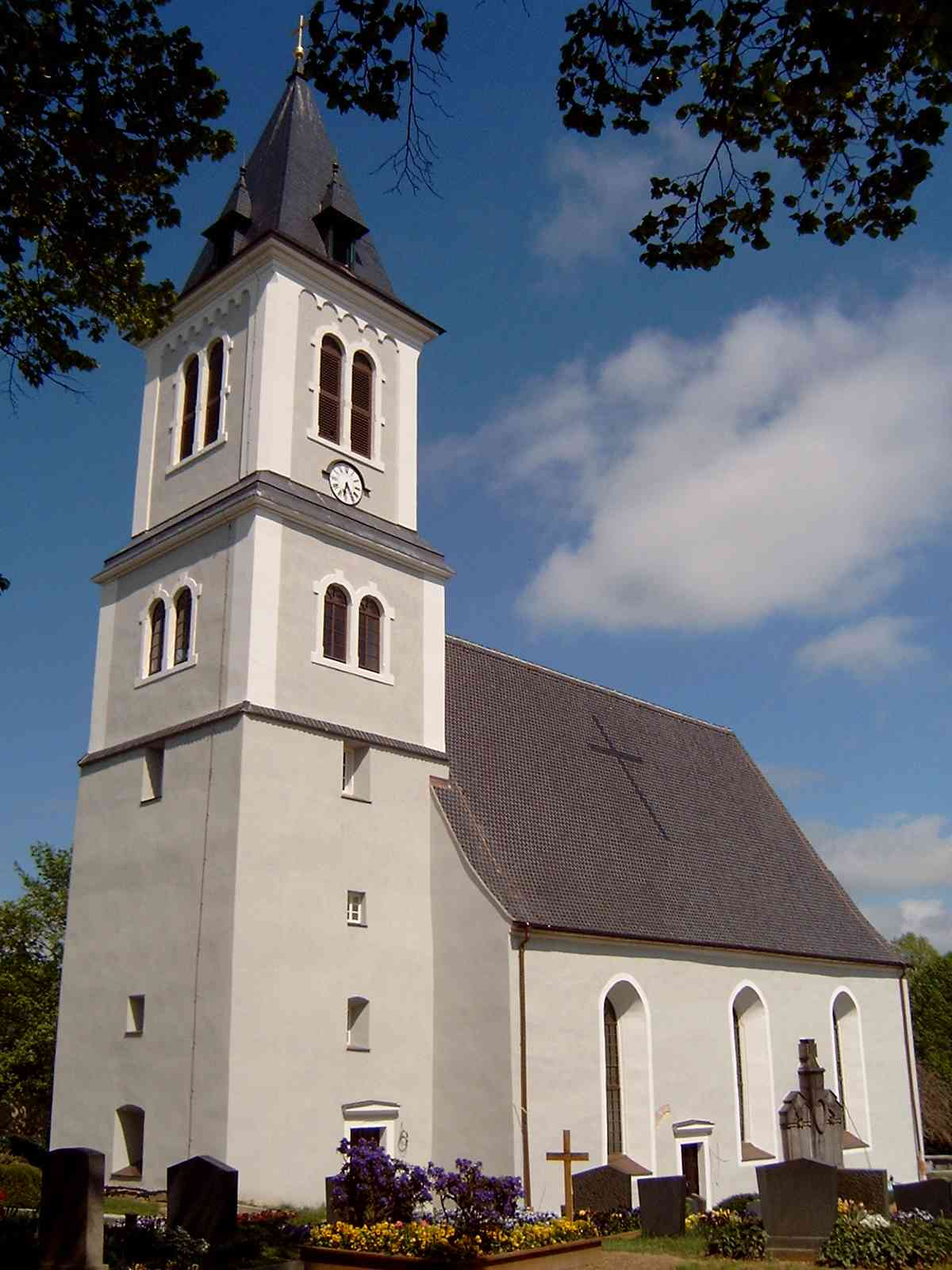
- Martinskirche Grossdrebnitz
- Interactive map of Großdrebnitz
- Location within Germany Location within Saxony
- Coordinates: 51°5′22″N 14°9′24″E
- Country: Germany
- State: Saxony
- District: Bautzen
- Town: Bischofswerda
- Elevation: 380 m (1,250 ft)

Population (2020-12-31)
  - Total: 862
- Time zone: UTC+01:00 (CET)
  - Summer (DST): UTC+02:00 (CEST)
- Postal codes: 01877
- Dialling codes: 03594
- Vehicle registration: BZ

Großdrebnitz, in Sorbian language Drjewnica, is part of the city of Bischofswerda in the district of Bautzen, in Saxony, Germany. It stretches along four km from the river Wesenitz in the north to the foothills of Lausitzer Bergland in the south.

Today's Großdrebnitz consists of the two parts Großdrebnitz and Kleindrebnitz, which were unified 1936 and became part of Bischofswerda in 1996. In both parts farmland dominates. Moreover, Kleindrebnitz has a centuries-long tradition in fish farming.

== History ==
=== First Reference in 1262 ===
Groß- and Kleindrebnitz (Drewenitz major, Drewenitz minor) were officially documented the first time in 1262. They belonged to the former Milceni area.

Some publications cite a first reference of Großdrebnitz already for 1007, when Henry II, Holy Roman Emperor donated a castellum Trebista to the Bishop of Meißen. This is not proved and no traces of a historical burgward were found in the village. Moreover, Doberschau claims this origin too, based on the same document.

=== Gold and Silver ===
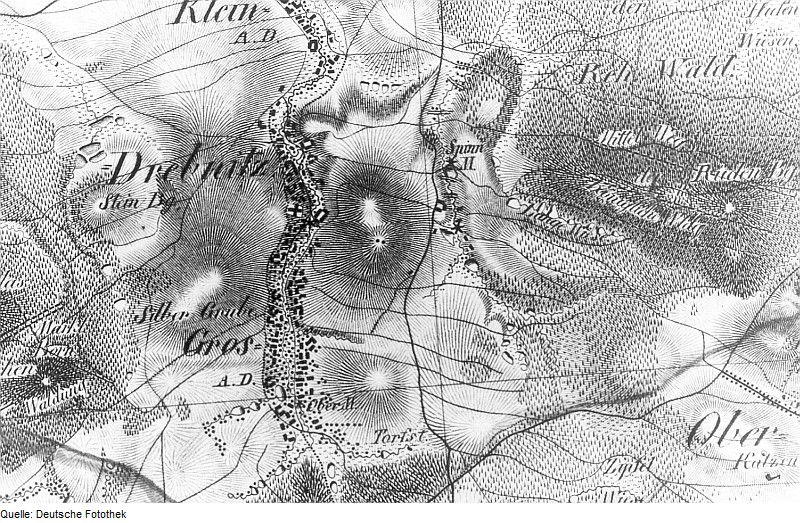
Silver mining in Großdrebnitz (Silbergrube, 1821)

Old records tell about people from Venice washing gold in Großdrebnitz. In the year 1559, when Augustus, Elector of Saxony had secularized the Stolpen territory of the Bishop of Meißen, the Amtsschösser was directed to search for gold in Großdrebnitz. Records from that time finally tell about silver which was mined near the church.,

=== The Martinskirche Großdrebnitz ===
Augustus, Elector of Saxony, introduced Protestant Reformation to the Stolpen region in 1559. On occasion of its 350th anniversary, the church was named after Martin Luther. The organ was already built in 1828 by Christian Gottfried Herbrig. His descendants became famous violin makers in Saint Paul, Minnesota.

Among the pastors of the church, Carl Julius Marloth (Lothmar, 1860-1875) was known for his writings which can be found e.g. in the British Library.

=== Saxon Origin of Australian Merino ===
Vorwerk Kleindrebnitz

World leading Australian sheep breeding has one of its major roots in Saxony. From 1765 the Spanish Merino was crossed here with Saxon sheep to develop a very fine wool type for textile manufacturers. From 1778, the Saxon breeding center was operated in the vorwerk Rennersdorf, nearby Großdrebnitz. It was administrated from 1796 by Johann Gottfried Nake, who developed scientific crossing methods to further improve Saxon Merino. About 1800, Saxon wool was considered to be the finest in the world.

In 1811, highly decorated Nake, one of the key persons of Saxony's world famous sheep breeding at that time, established a private farm in the Vorwerk in Kleindrebnitz. After the Napoleonic Wars Saxony urgently needed money to rebuild the country and thus decided to lift the export ban on living Merinos. The sheep export to Australia and Russia was successful to such an extent that Saxon sheep breeders themselves dramatically lost market shares. This development was faced by Nake in Kleindrebnitz too.

==== A Nearly Forgotten Treasure ====
The Vorwerk was built by Saxon court architect Gottlob Friedrich Thormeyer. It is reported that later forestry professor Max Neumeister was born here and it is supposed that for some years it served as manufacture to build the Herbrig organs. However, this neo-classic building has not been well preserved over time and lost much of its original character.

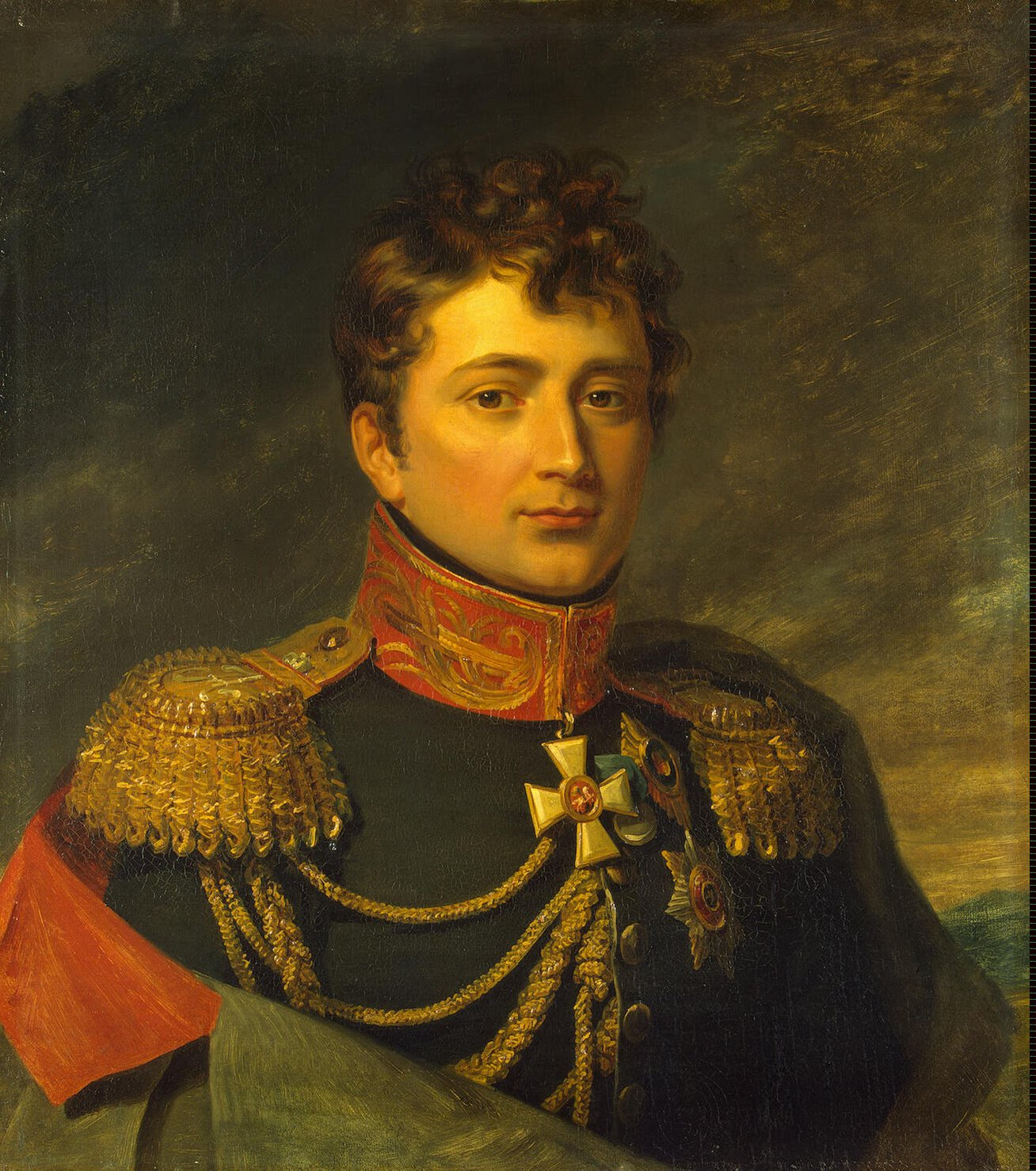
The Vicomte de Saint-Priest, by George Dawe from the Military Gallery of the Winter Palace

=== The Battle of Großdrebnitz ===
In 1813, from September 13 to 17, the village was scene of a battle in the War of the Sixth Coalition. Russian troops were commanded by Louis Alexandre Andrault de Langeron and Guillaume Emmanuel Guignard, vicomte de Saint-Priest, whose cavalry defeated French troops. On September 14, French Brigade General François Basile Azemar was killed and on September 20 General Adam Albert von Neipperg occupied Großdrebnitz.

== People ==
=== Famous Visitors ===
- Saxon court painter Ludwig Otto was married with a daughter of pastor Rüdiger from Großdrebnitz. He regularly visited the village to paint here. One of his oil paintings is preserved in the Martinskirche.
- German graphic designer and painter Paul Sinkwitz, who was awarded 1980 with the Bundesverdienstkreuz for his artistic achievements and resistance against Nazi regime, visited Großdrebnitz in 1923 and drew Autumn Festival.
- U.S. Sociologist Walter A. Terpenning (Michigan University) visited "Klein Drebnitz" and wrote about it in Village and open-country neighborhoods (1931).

=== Births ===
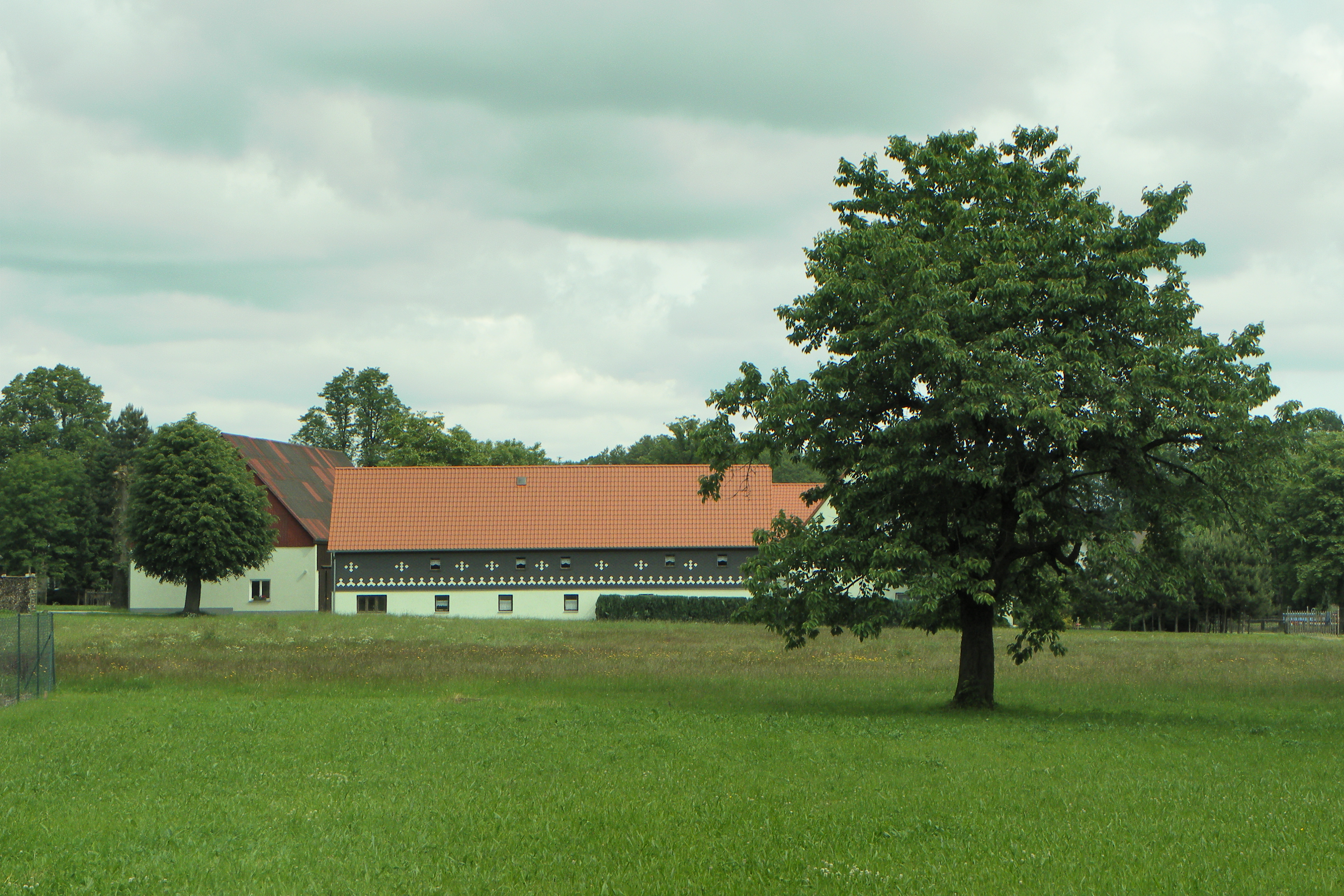
Birthplace of Bruno Steglich

- Robert Heller (1812-1871) was a famous writer of historical novels. He belonged to the movement Young Germany in Leipzig and was reporter from the Frankfurt Parliament. As author, he was the first to make Florian Geyer popular, as publisher he was the first to print Friedrich Gerstäcker. Later he became a renowned critic in Hamburg.
- Max Neumeister (1849-1929) was director of the Royal Saxon Academy of Forestry and Fellow of the Leopoldina. During his directorship around 1900, Tharandt was world famous and attracted foreign students to a share of nearly 50%. Neumeister contributed to the German exhibition at 1904 St. Louis World's Fair.
- Bruno Steglich (1857-1929) established in 1890 an agricultural experiment station in the Botanic Garden Dresden, where he was responsible e.g. for plant protection. His tomb in Trebsen was created by Georg Wrba.
- Hermann Vetter (1859-1928) was co-director of the "Carl Maria von Weber" College of Music in Dresden. His Technical Studies (1899) for playing piano were recommended by Eugen d'Albert as educational material. Vetter was a renowned teacher and especially known for editing Franz Liszt and Johann Baptist Cramer.

== Literature ==
- Bruno Barthel. Altes und Neues aus Groß- und Kleindrebnitz. Friedrich May Bischofswerda, 1907
- Frank Fiedler. Zeugnisse früherer wirtschaftlicher Tätigkeit am Laufe des Weickersdorfer Wassers. Zwischen Wesenitz und Löbauer Wasser 4, S. 3-7, 1999
- Frank Fiedler. Das Jahr 1900 in den Gemeinden Groß- und Kleindrebnitz. Zwischen Wesenitz und Löbauer Wasser 5, S. 52-58, 2000
