= Liebethaler Grund =

Narrow valley in Saxony, Germany

Coordinates: 50.9966°N 13.9623°E

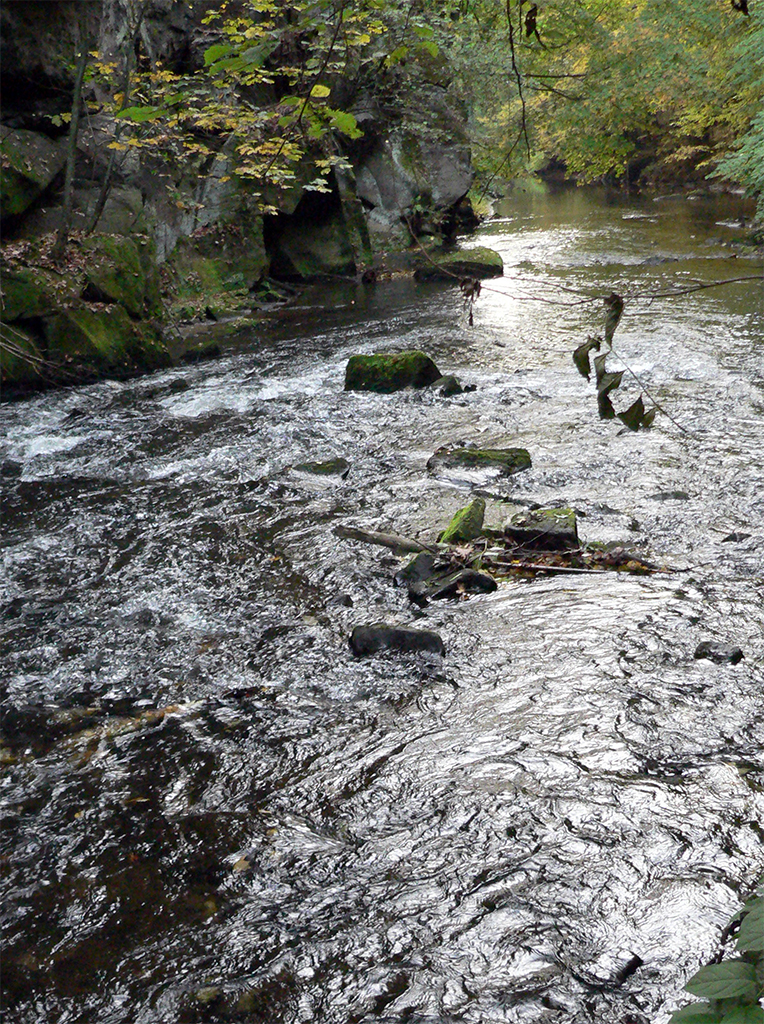
The Wesenitz in the valley of Liebethaler Grund

The Liebethaler Grund is a narrow, deeply incised valley of the Wesenitz river in the vicinity of Liebethal near Pirna. The valley is a popular walking trail, the Poet-Musician-Artist Way (Dichter-Musiker-Maler-Weg) and is describedas the "Gateway to Saxon Switzerland“ (on the classic route). In the vicinity of an old hydropower station is the largest Wagner memorial in the world.

== Gallery ==
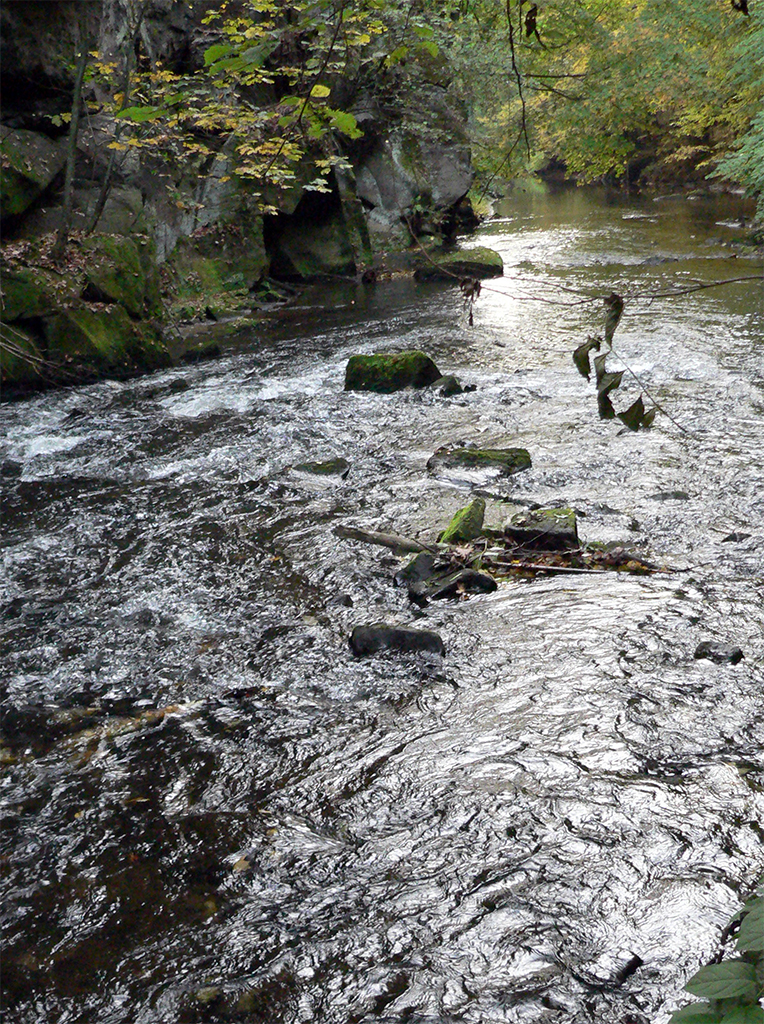
The Wesenitz in the Liebethaler Grund

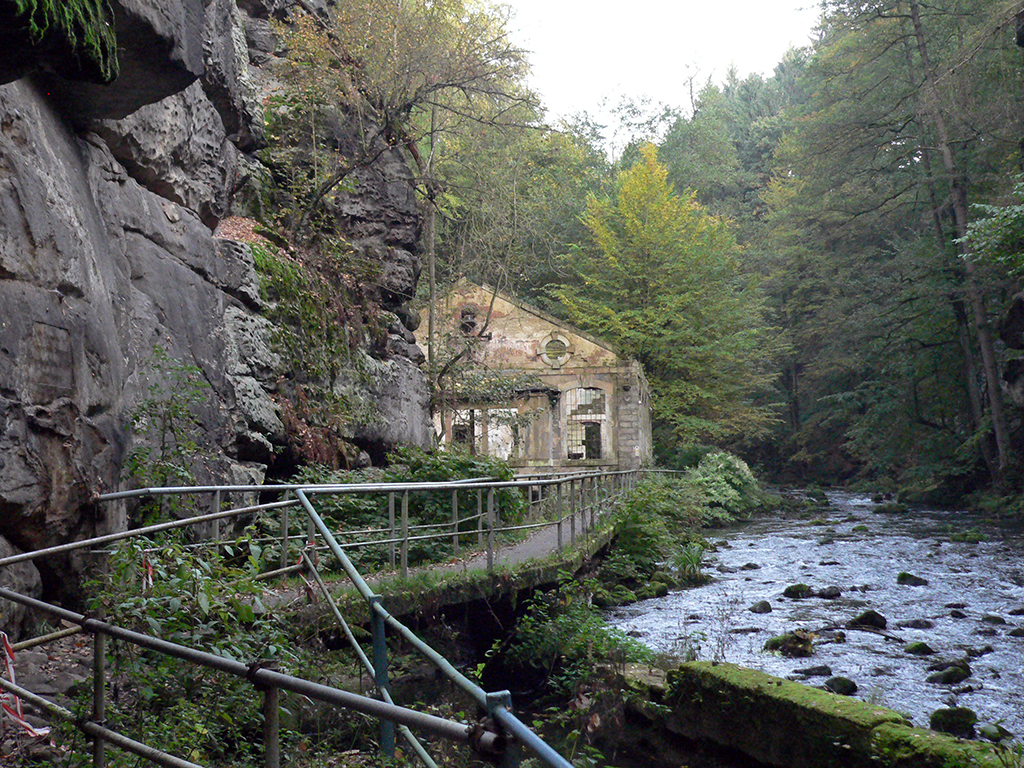
Ruined building of the hydropower station (Copitzer Elektrizitätswerk)

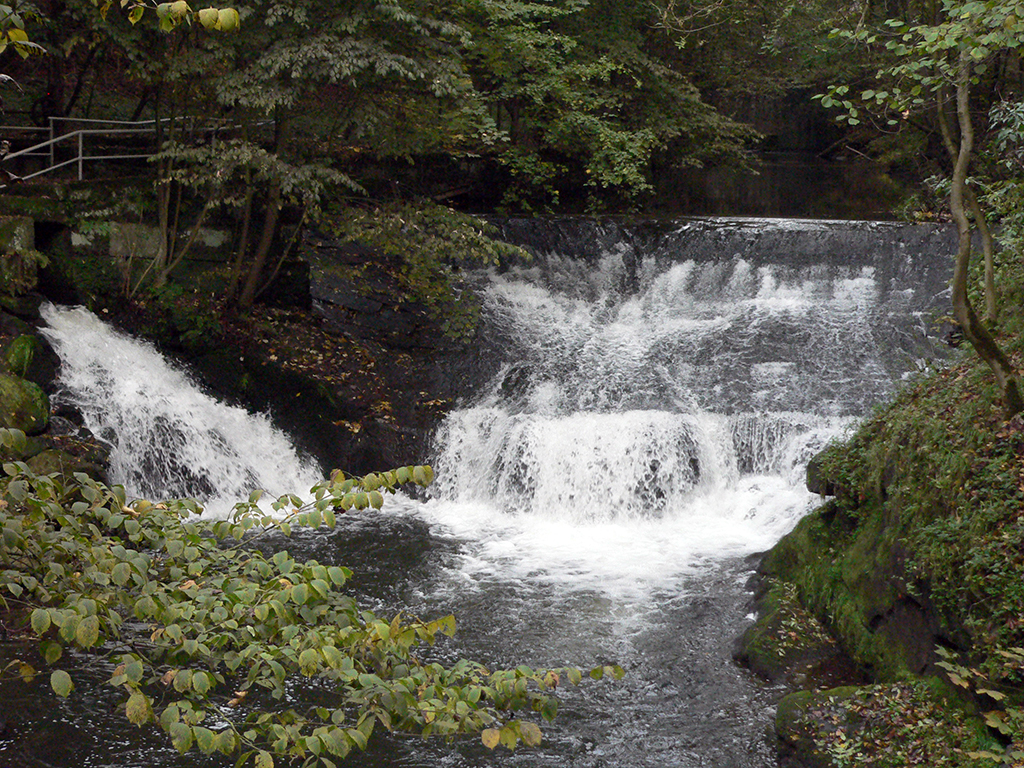

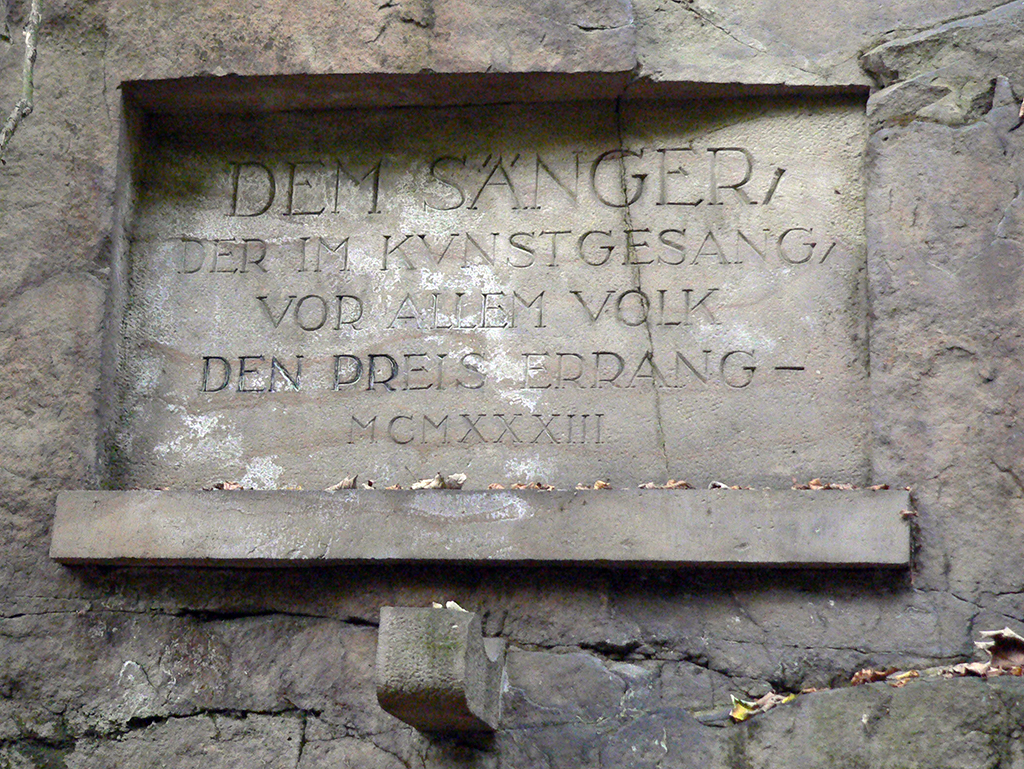
Tablet carved into the rock near the Richard Wagner Memorial
