= Wesenitz =

River in Germany

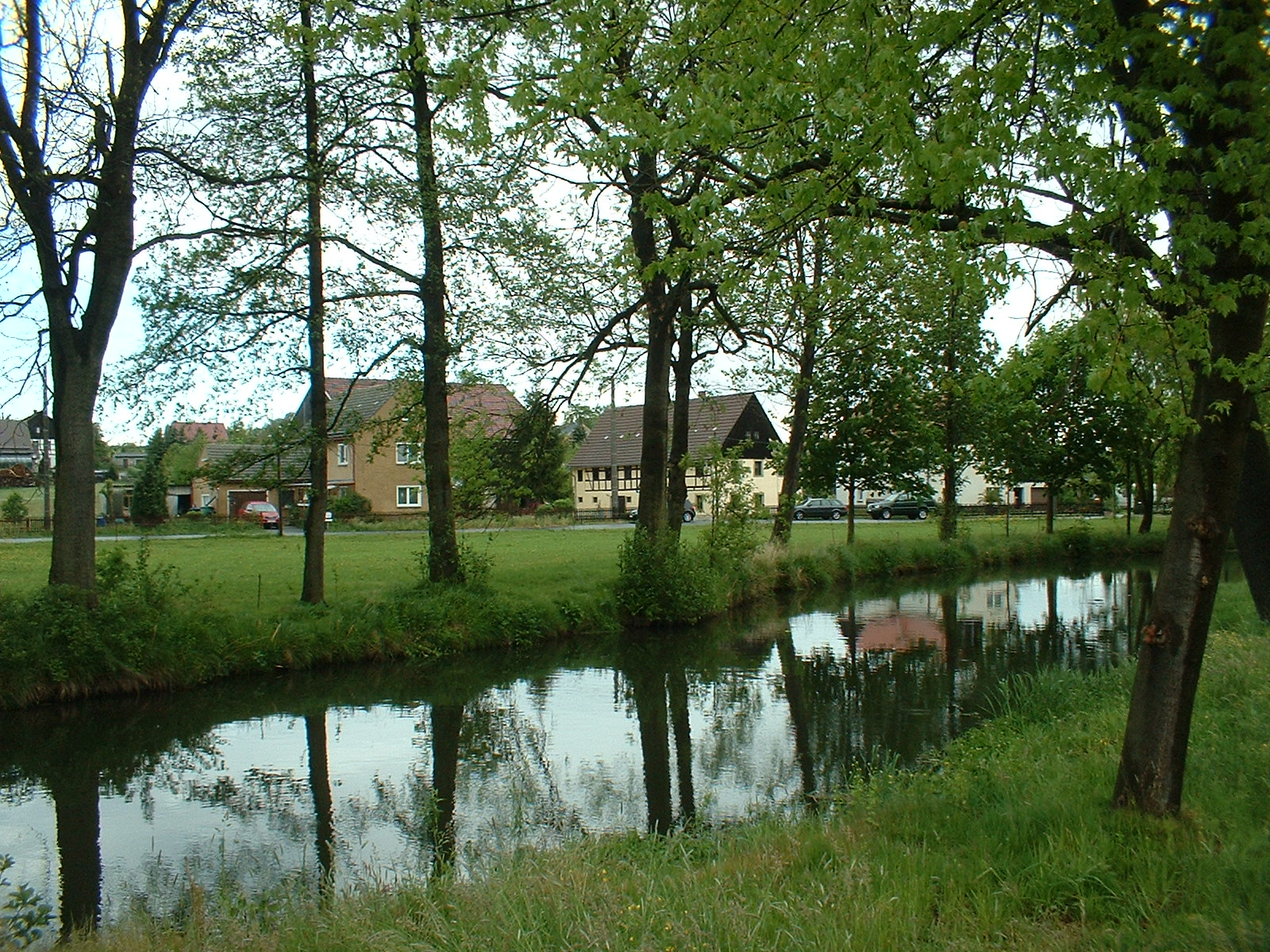
- Wesenitz near Helmsdorf (Stolpen)
- Native name: Wjazońca (Upper Sorbian) (Upper Sorbian)

Location
- Country: Germany
- State: Saxony

Physical characteristics
- Source
  - location: Lausitzer Bergland
- Mouth
  - location: Elbe
  - coordinates: 50°57′49″N 13°53′39″E
- Length: 83 km (52 mi)
- Basin size: 278 km^{2} (107 sq mi)

Basin features
- Progression: Elbe→ North Sea

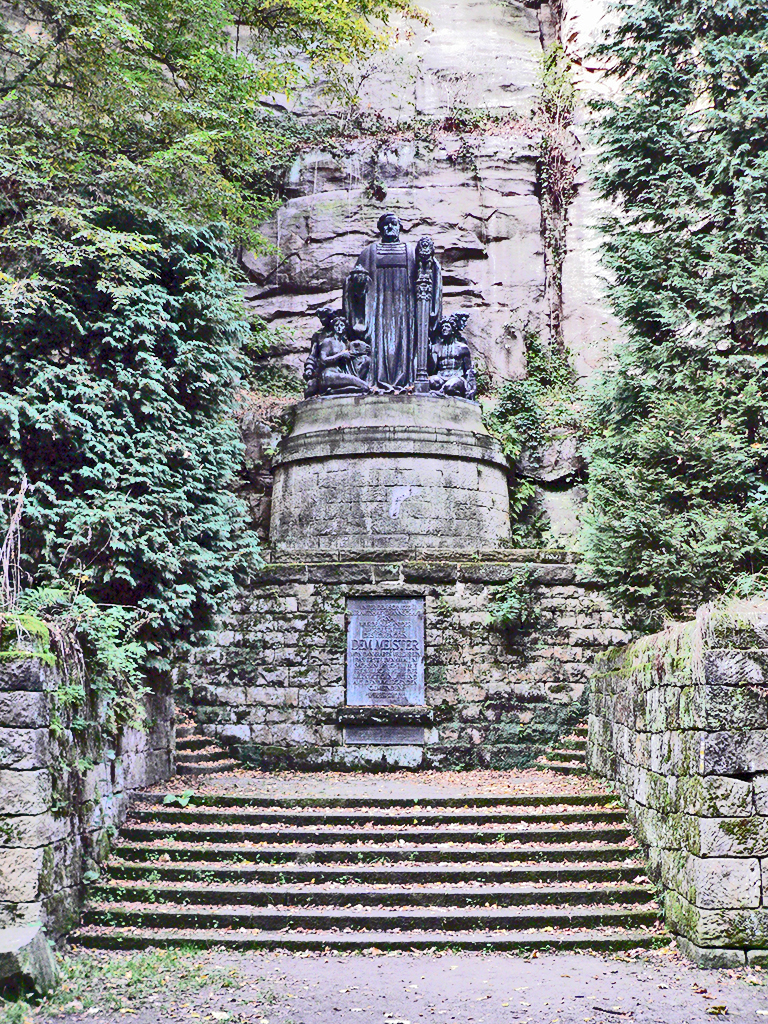
Richard Wagner Monument by Richard Guhr

The Wesenitz (German pronunciation: [ˈveːzənɪts]; Upper Sorbian: Wjazońca) is a river in Saxony, Germany, a right tributary of the Elbe. Its total length is 83 km (52 mi). The Wesenitz runs through the tourist regions of the Lusatian Highlands and Saxon Switzerland. Its name is derived from the Sorbian language wjaz (Elm).

== Geography ==
The Wesenitz originates near Neukirch/Lausitz and flows southwest through Bischofswerda, passes Großdrebnitz, and flows through Stolpen and Dürrröhrsdorf-Dittersbach. The Wesenitz joins the Elbe near Pirna.

== Touristic attractions ==
The Stolpen Castle is officially documented for the first time in 1222, when it was a property of the Bishop of Dresden-Meissen. In 1559 it was handed over to Augustus, Elector of Saxony. The castle's fame originates from the period 1716 until 1765 when Augustus II the Strong imprisoned there his mistress Countess of Cosel.

The Liebethaler Grund, the "Gateway to Saxon Switzerland", is a picturesque ravine. Near a former hydropower station the world's biggest memorial to Richard Wagner can be visited.

== Historical usage ==
Beginning with the inauguration of Johann V. of Weißenbach in 1476, the Bishops of Meißen until 1559 and later the prince-electors of Saxony performed fish farming of carps in two ponds between Goldbach and Kleindrebnitz respectively in Bischofswerda, which were fed with Wesenitz water. The fish farms were of approximately 20 ha each and had to be closed due to economic and technical reasons about 1815.

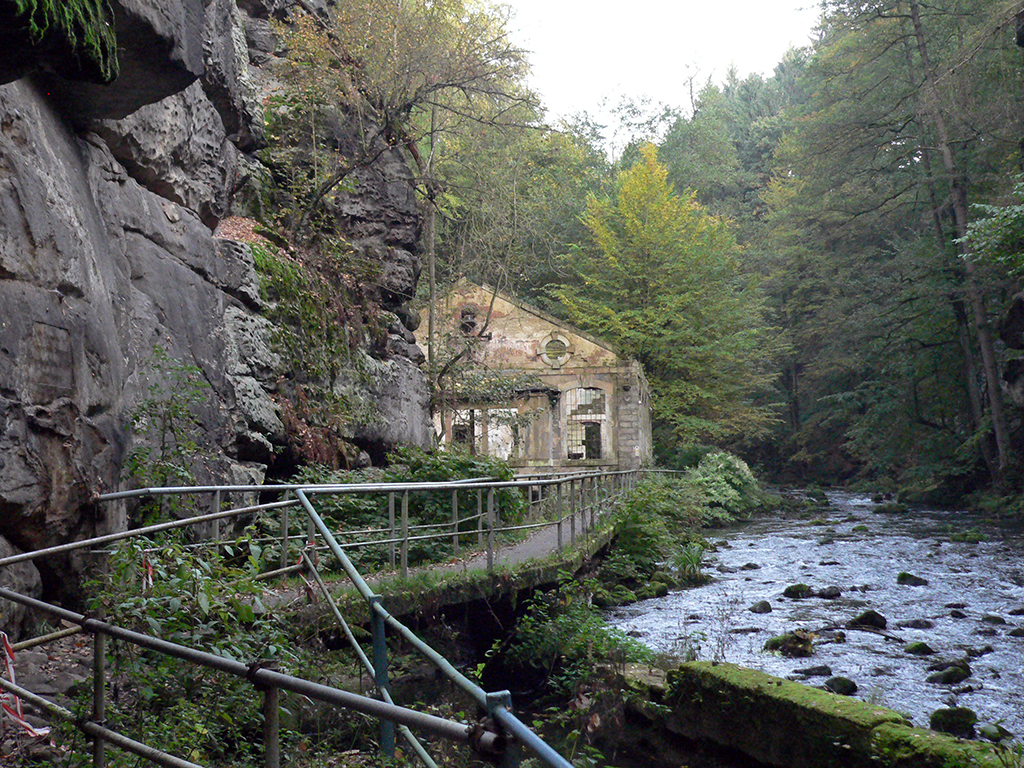
Historical mill in the Liebethaler Grund

In 1895, 63 industrial plants made use of the water power, among them 44 mills. Today, five such water mills can still be visited. One of them with two Francis turbines is operated by Lohmen in the Liebethaler Grund.

== Fauna ==
With an average width of 10 m and an average slope of 0.53%, grayling resp. brown trouts are the leading species in the lower and middle part, resp. the upper part of the river Wesenitz.

Down from Helmsdorf, the river Wesenitz is protected according to the Habitats Directive, referring to the appearance of European bullhead and common minnow. In 1994, the salmon was renaturalized.

The Wesenitz historically inhabited a large population of otters, which were hated by the fishermen. The otters been extinct until 1920, but revived in recent years due to conservation measures. Since 1969, a migration from the river system of Schwarze Elster is reported at Großharthau respectively Bischofswerda and is noticed in traffic victims at crossing points over the B6.

== See also ==
- List of rivers of Saxony
