= List of German Democratic Party politicians =

A list of notable politicians of the defunct German Democratic Party:

== A ==
- Emil Abderhalden
- Gustav Altenhain

== B ==
- Friedrich Baltrusch
- Marie Baum
- Gertrud Bäumer
- Adolf Bauser
- Ludwig Bergsträsser
- Andreas Blunck
- Friedrich Burmeister

== C ==
- Julius Curtius

== D ==
- Thomas Dehler
- Berthold Deimling
- Bernhard Dernburg

== F ==
- Richard Freudenberg
- Ferdinand Friedensburg

== G ==
- Hellmut von Gerlach
- Otto Gessler
- Eberhard Gothein

== H ==
- Willy Hellpach
- Theodor Heuss
- Elly Heuss-Knapp
- Karl Hoffmann
- Hermann Höpker-Aschoff
- Erhard Hübener
- Hermann Hummel

== K ==
- Harry Kessler
- Wilhelm Kobelt
- Waldemar Koch
- Erich Koch-Weser
- Wilhelm Külz

== L ==
- Ludwig Landmann
- Helene Lange
- Theodor Liesching
- Arthur Lieutenant
- Marie Elisabeth Lüders
- Erich Lüth

== M ==
- Hermann Maas
- Artur Mahraun
- Reinhold Maier
- Friedrich Meinecke
- Friedrich Middelhauve

== N ==
- Friedrich Naumann
- Otto Nuschke

== O ==
- Rudolf Oeser

== P ==
- Rudolf Paul
- Friedrich von Payer
- Carl Wilhelm Petersen
- Hugo Preuß

== Q ==
- Ludwig Quidde

== R ==
- Fritz Raschig
- Walther Rathenau
- Paul Rohrbach

== S ==
- Hjalmar Schacht
- Eugen Schiffer
- Wilhelmine Schirmer-Pröscher
- Walther Schreiber
- Walther Schücking
- Gerhart von Schulze-Gaevernitz
- Ernst Siehr
- Gustav Stolper

== T ==
- Ernst Troeltsch

== V ==
- Georg Voigt

== W ==
- Alfred Weber
- Marianne Weber
- Max Weber
- Bernhard Weiß
- Eberhard Wildermuth
- Frieda Wunderlich
