= Quidde =

Quidde is a surname. Notable people with the surname include:

- Ludwig Quidde (1858–1941), German politician
- Margarethe Quidde (1858–1940), German cellist, writer, music educator, and pianist
