= Arthur Lieutenant =

German politician (1884–1968)

- Born: September 9, 1884; Jauer, Province of Silesia, German Empire
- Died: 10 October 1968 (aged 84); Frankfurt am Main, BRD (West Germany)
- Occupation: Politician
- Political party: DVP; DDP; LDPD; DPD; Exil-LDPD

Arthur Lieutenant (9 September 1884 – 10 October 1968) was a German Liberal politician.

His political career peaked and crashed in the late 1940s when he found himself on the losing side as the newly established German Democratic Republic reverted to one-party government.

== Biography ==
=== Early years ===
Arthur Lieutenant was born in Jauer, an old market town in Silesia, some 70 km (43 mi) west of Breslau. Upon leaving school he studied economics before embarking on a career as a tax lawyer.

The rather confused revolutionary period directly following the war involved the establishment and / or reinvention of several political parties in Germany. One of these was the German People's Party (DVP/Deutsche Volkspartei) established towards the end of 1918. Arthur Lieutenant was a founding member. As the country moved uncertainly towards a more democratic future, several centrist and left leaning liberal groupings coalesced around the same time to form the German Democratic Party (DDP/Deutsche Demokratische Partei). During the early post-war period the DVP initially rejected the Weimar Constitution which, as matters later turned out, would form the basis for government in Germany till 1933. In 1919 Arthur Lieutenant switched his party allegiance to the DDP which was proving less grudging in its acceptance of the post-imperial constitutional structure being put in place.

=== Politics (Weimar Germany) ===
By 1918 Lieutenant had moved to Glogau, a larger town, still in Silesia, but roughly 100 km (62 mi) to the north of Jauer. Here, in 1919, he joined the town council, serving between 1931 and 1933 as the town mayor. Regime change took place in January 1933 when the NSDAP (Nazi Party) took power and lost little time in implementing a retreat from democracy in favour of one-party government across Germany. Lieutenant was relieved of his civic duties, arrested and briefly imprisoned.

=== Politics (Soviet occupation zone / German Democratic Republic) ===
The war ended in May 1945 and with it the Hitler regime. Following frontier changes mandated by the military winners and large scale ethnic cleansing, there was no future for a German in the now Polish town of Głogów. In what remained of Germany it had been widely assumed that the fall of Hitler would open the way for a return from dictatorship, back to multi-party democracy. Arthur Lieutenant turned to national politics in the country's Soviet occupation zone. On 21 June 1945, at Wilmersdorf, he was a founding member of the Liberal Democratic Party of Germany (LDPD), effectively a re-founding with a new name of the old DDP, suppressed in 1933. The LDPD's first leader was Waldemar Koch, but he was forced to resign by the Soviets after a few months. Towards the end of 1945 the LDPD leadership passed to Wilhelm Külz whom the Soviets found more accommodating on the issue of land reform: in 1946 Arthur Lieutenant became Külz's deputy.

There was a widespread perception across Germany that political division of the German "left" that had opened the way for the rise of the "right-wing" Nazi Party in the 1930s. Within the Soviet occupation zone, this provided justification for a contentious merger, in April 1946, between the old Communist Party and the moderate left SPD. However, within the resulting merged party, the Socialist Unity Party (Sozialistische Einheitspartei Deutschlands, SED) former members of the SPD quickly found themselves sidelined or excluded from positions of influence, and by October 1949, when the Soviet occupation zone was formally reinvented as the German Democratic Republic, the SED had effectively become a Soviet sponsored version of the old German Communist Party with a new name. Although a return to one-party government was clearly on the agenda, this was to be achieved in East Germany not by banning opposition parties, but simply by ensuring that they were adequately controlled by the ruling SED. This gave rise to acute tensions within the LDPD between those seeking to retain power and influence by dancing to the tune of the SED and those still believing that there was a future for an independent liberal party in (East) Germany. Parallel tensions arose between the LDPD in East Germany and Western members of the Democratic Party of Germany, which was founded in March 1947 and was seen for a time as a reborn pan-German liberal party. Lieutenant's career in the LDPD party leadership team was a correspondingly difficult one. In January 1948, at a meeting in Frankfurt of the Democratic Party of Germany, a last-ditch attempt to build a single post-Nazi Liberal Party across West and East Germany ended in recriminations, with the leading delegate from the Western occupation zones angrily accusing his Eastern counterparts of having chosen "the Russian version of German unity". Külz had not even turned up for the meeting and it was left to his dapper lawyerly deputy, Arthur Lieutenant, to spell out the obvious conclusion that under the circumstances further co-operation across the four occupation zones was from now on, for the eastern Liberals, impossible. As he left the meeting, Lieutenant concluded with a more telling comment, referencing a quotation attributed to Luther at his trial in 1521, "Know this. We can do nothing else"

By the end of December 1948 the consciously "western" Free Democratic Party had been founded in the Western occupation zones. Before that, on 10 April 1948, Arthur Lieutenant visited his boss, Wilhelm Külz, on the morning of 10 April 1948, only to be greeted by the housekeeper with the unusual information, even though it was already 8 in the morning, Külz had not yet emerged from his bedroom. Lieutenant accompanied the housekeeper into Külz's bedroom only to discover that the elderly East German Liberal Democratic Party leader had unexpectedly died in the night, apparently as the result of a heart attack.

After the death of the party leader Arthur Lieutenant, as his deputy, took over his duties. Sources are nevertheless ambiguous on whether he can strictly be counted as party leader. Some commentators thought that if there had been an election of members, Lieutenant would have been voted in as party leader, but, possibly mindful of this possibility, the Soviet Military Administration did not permit such an election. Lieutenant's position in the party is accordingly sometimes described as that of "acting" party leader between April and October 1948.

The structural device whereby East Germany's ruling SED (party) controlled the country's other parties (known as "Bloc parties") was the National Front, an administrative framework incorporating political parties along with various officially approved mass movements, each entitled to participate in elections and to send members to the National Legislature (Volkskammer) on the basis of predetermined quotas. Arthur Lieutenant was not a supporter of the Soviet style constitutional arrangements being imposed by the government: there were also sharp tensions within the LDPD. In October 1948 he resigned his party offices, and was succeeded as party leader, largely out of a sense of duty, by Dr. Karl Hamann who for a few years continued to place hope in the miraculous possibility of a somehow reunited Germany delivering a return to democratic political institutions. In the month he resigned from the national party leadership team Arthur Lieutenant was appointed Finance Minister in the regional government of Brandenburg which may have been a necessary job at the regional level, although in Brandenburg and across the country the regional tier of government was increasingly being sidelined as power accrued to the central committee of the ruling party. In 1948/49 he was also nominated to membership of the "Provisional Volkskammer" which with the formal founding of the German Democratic Republic in October 1949 would become the new country's national legislature (though always subject to the leading role of the Socialist Unity Party). Lieutenant evidently remained under pressure, however, and in October 1949, a few days before the founding of the German Democratic Republic was celebrated in East Berlin, Arthur Lieutenant fled to West Berlin.

Between 1950 and 1953, based in West Berlin, he served as the party leader of the "Exil-LDPD", effectively the Liberal Democratic Party of Germany in exile. Sources are silent as to what this involved, however. After 1953, the year in which he reached his 69th birthday, Arthur Lieutenant ceased to be politically active. He died in Frankfurt am Main (i.e. in West Germany) in 1968.
