= Hessian Landtag elections in the Weimar Republic =

German state elections

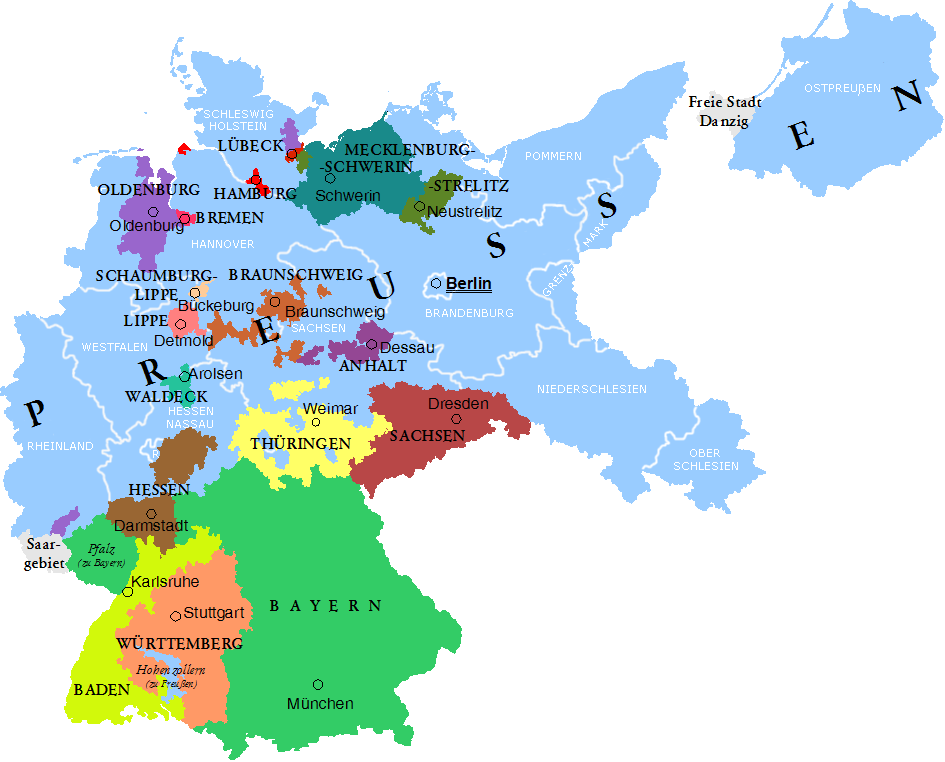
Hesse in the Weimar Republic. On the left in brown

Landtag elections in the People's State of Hesse (Volksstaat Hessen) during the Weimar Republic were held at irregular intervals between 1919 and 1932. Results with regard to the total vote, the percentage of the vote won and the number of seats allocated to each party are presented in the tables below. On 31 March 1933, the sitting Landtag was dissolved by the Nazi-controlled central government and reconstituted to reflect the distribution of seats in the national Reichstag. The Landtag subsequently was formally abolished as a result of the "Law on the Reconstruction of the Reich" of 30 January 1934 which replaced the German federal system with a unitary state.

== 1919 ==
The 1919 Hessian state election was held on 26 January 1919 to elect the 70 members of the Hessian constituent people's assembly.

Party	Votes	%	Seats
Social Democratic Party of Germany	273,468	44.45	31
German Democratic Party	116,252	18.90	13
Centre Party	108,539	17.64	13
German People's Party	62,072	10.09	7
German National People's Party	45,785	7.44	5
Independent Social Democratic Party of Germany	9,077	1.48	1
Total	615,193	100.00	70
Valid votes	615,193	99.71	
Invalid/blank votes	1,761	0.29	
Total votes	616,954	100.00	
Registered voters/turnout	760,053	81.17	
Source: Elections in the Weimar Republic, Elections in Germany

== 1921 ==
The 1921 Hessian state election was held on 27 November 1921 to elect the 70 members of the Hessian Landtag.

Party	Votes	%	Seats	+/–
Social Democratic Party of Germany	174,213	32.63	24	–7
Centre Party	92,689	17.36	13	0
Hessischer Bauernbund	80,426	15.06	11	New
German People's Party	78,185	14.64	10	+3
German Democratic Party	39,140	7.33	5	–8
German National People's Party	28,190	5.28	3	–2
Communist Party of Germany	20,849	3.90	2	New
Independent Social Democratic Party of Germany	20,186	3.78	2	+1
Revisionspartei	52	0.01	0	New
Total	533,930	100.00	70	0
Valid votes	533,930	99.57		
Invalid/blank votes	2,290	0.43		
Total votes	536,220	100.00		
Registered voters/turnout	800,547	66.98		
Source: Elections in the Weimar Republic, Elections in Germany

== 1924 ==
The 1924 Hessian state election was held on 7 December 1924 to elect the 70 members of the Hessian Landtag.

Party	Votes	%	Seats	+/–
Social Democratic Party of Germany	220,108	35.21	26	+2
Centre Party	100,384	16.06	11	–2
Hessischer Bauernbund	82,742	13.24	9	–2
German People's Party	73,930	11.83	8	–2
German Democratic Party	53,301	8.53	6	+1
German National People's Party	43,717	6.99	5	+2
Communist Party of Germany	33,689	5.39	4	+2
National Socialist Freedom Movement	8,478	1.36	1	New
Reich Party of the German Middle Class	5,851	0.94	0	New
Vereinigte schaffende hessische Landwirte	2,932	0.47	0	New
Total	625,132	100.00	70	0
Valid votes	625,132	98.10		
Invalid/blank votes	12,132	1.90		
Total votes	637,264	100.00		
Registered voters/turnout	846,196	75.31		
Source: Elections in the Weimar Republic, Elections in Germany

== 1927 ==
The 1927 Hessian state election was held on 13 November 1927 to elect the 70 members of the Hessian Landtag.

1927 Hessian Landtag election
Party	Votes	%	Seats	+/–
Social Democratic Party of Germany	157,293	32.59	24	–2
Centre Party	85,450	17.70	13	+2
Hessischer Bauernbund	61,109	12.66	9	0
German People's Party	51,654	10.70	7	–1
Communist Party of Germany	41,280	8.55	6	+2
German Democratic Party	37,789	7.83	5	–1
Reich Party for Civil Rights and Deflation	24,123	5.00	3	New
German National People's Party	23,998	4.97	3	–2
Total	482,696	100.00	70	0
Valid votes	482,696	98.79		
Invalid/blank votes	5,908	1.21		
Total votes	488,604	100.00		
Registered voters/turnout	893,144	54.71		
Source: Elections in the Weimar Republic, Elections in Germany

== 1931 ==
The 1931 Hessian state election was held on 15 November 1931 to elect the 70 members of the Hessian Landtag.

1931 Hessian Landtag election
Party	Votes	%	Seats	+/–
Nazi Party	291,183	37.08	27	New
Social Democratic Party of Germany	168,101	21.41	16	–8
Communist Party of Germany	112,444	14.32	10	+4
Centre Party	106,790	13.60	10	–3
Hessischer Bauernbund	20,763	2.64	2	–7
German People's Party	18,324	2.33	1	–6
Christian Social People's Service	16,714	2.13	1	New
Communist Party of Germany (Opposition)	14,938	1.90	1	New
German National People's Party	10,857	1.38	1	–2
German State Party	10,822	1.38	1	New
Socialist Workers' Party of Germany	8,170	1.04	0	New
Radical Democratic Party	4,613	0.59	0	New
Reich Party for Civil Rights and Deflation	1,585	0.20	0	New
Total	785,304	100.00	70	0
Valid votes	785,304	98.99		
Invalid/blank votes	8,002	1.01		
Total votes	793,306	100.00		
Registered voters/turnout	963,960	82.30		
Source: Elections in the Weimar Republic, Elections in Germany

== 1932 ==
The 1932 Hessian state election was held on 19 June 1932 to elect the 70 members of the Hessian Landtag.

1932 Hessian Landtag election
Party	Votes	%	Seats	+/–
Nazi Party	328,306	43.97	32	+5
Social Democratic Party of Germany	172,552	23.11	17	+1
Centre Party	108,601	14.54	10	0
Communist Party of Germany	82,124	11.00	7	–3
National Unity List	25,186	3.37	2	New
Socialist Workers' Party of Germany	11,689	1.57	1	+1
German National People's Party	11,266	1.51	1	0
Hessische Demokratie	4,921	0.66	0	New
Liste Leuchtgens	2,077	0.28	0	New
Total	746,722	100.00	70	0
Valid votes	746,722	98.99		
Invalid/blank votes	7,645	1.01		
Total votes	754,367	100.00		
Registered voters/turnout	977,143	77.20		
Source: Elections in the Weimar Republic, Elections in Germany
