= Julius Jacobson (ophthalmologist) =

German ophthalmologist (1828–1889)

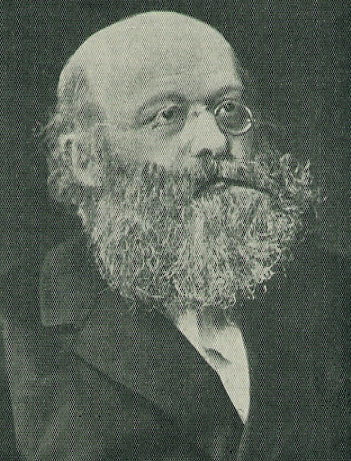
Julius Jacobson

Julius Jacobson (18 August 1828 – 14 September 1889) was a German ophthalmologist, known for his efforts in establishing ophthalmology as an independent subject in Prussia, separate from surgery.

Born into a Jewish family in Königsberg, he studied medicine at the University of Königsberg, receiving his doctorate in 1853. Following graduation, he furthered his education in ophthalmology at Prague under Carl Ferdinand von Arlt and at the University of Berlin as a pupil of Albrecht von Graefe. Afterwards, he returned to Königsberg, where in 1856–58 he worked as an assistant to Albert Seerig at the university surgical clinic. In 1859 he obtained his habilitation for ophthalmology, and two years later became an associate professor. In 1873 he was named a full professor of ophthalmology at the University of Königsberg, where he later became director of newly constructed eye clinic. He died in Cranz.

His name is associated with "Jacobson's retinitis", a condition that is also referred to as syphilitic retinitis. His daughter Margarethe Quidde married German pacifist Ludwig Quidde, who received the Nobel Peace Prize in 1927.

== Selected works ==
- Ein neues und gefahrloses Operations-Verfahren zur Heilung des grauen Staares, (1863) – A new and riskless operative method for healing opaque cataracts.
- Mittheilungen aus der Konigsberger Universitats-Augenklinik 1877-1879, (1880) – Communications from the University of Königsberg ophthalmology clinic in 1877–79.
- Albrecht von Graefe's Verdienste um die neuere Ophthalmologie, (1885) – Albrecht von Graefe's contribution to recent ophthalmology.
- Beiträge zur Pathologie des Auges, (1888) – Contribution to the pathology of the eye.
