= Rolf Jähnichen =

German politician (1939–2025)

- Born: Martin Rolf Jähnichen; 11 May 1939; Helmsdorf, Gau Saxony, Germany
- Died: 7 December 2025 (aged 86)
- Occupation: Politician
- Political party: CDU (east); CDU
- Children: 3

Rolf Jähnichen (11 May 1939 – 7 December 2025) was a German politician.

Between 1994 and 1999, he was a member of the State Assembly in Saxony. Between 1990 and 1998, he served as Saxony's Agriculture minister, with the Environment added to his portfolio in 1998. He retired from his political career in 1999.

== Background ==
Jähnichen, a Roman Catholic, was born a few months before the outbreak of war in a small town in the mining region known sometimes as "Saxon Switzerland" near the frontier with Czechoslovakia. He attended secondary school in Grimma and Leipzig before moving on to study Agriculture at Leipzig between 1957 and 1963. He concluded his studies with agricultural economics, obtaining a doctorate in the subject.

From 1964 till 1970, he was employed by the Leipzig district council in the agriculture department (where he was responsible for mining). After that, between 1970 and 1990, he was production director and deputy chairman of the Neukirchen Agriculture Co-operative at Borna.

Jähnichen died on 7 December 2025, at the age of 86.

== Politics ==
Jähnichen joined the Christian Democratic Union (East Germany) in 1981. (Unlike its West German counterpart, the East German CDU, as part of the country's National Front alliance was effectively controlled by the country's ruling SED party.) Between 1984 and 1989, Jähnichen was a member of the local council in his hometown of Zedtlitz, on the edge of Leipzig. Between 1989 and 1990, he was a member of the CDU party executive.

The fall of the Berlin wall in November was the first of a series of events that by August 1990 had led to the end of East Germany as a stand-alone state and the reunification of Germany. During this period, between May and November 1990, Jähnichen served as the first freely elected council leader ("Landrat") in Borna district. Between February 1990 and September 1994, he served as district chairman of the CDU (the eastern and western pieces of which reunited in October 1990).

In October 1994, he was elected to the Saxony state assembly (Landtag), representing a Leipzig district. He continued to sit as a member of the Landtag till 2009 when he decided not to seek re-election in the September election. From 2000 he was also a member and chairman of his party's regional Senior Citizens' Committee.

== Ministerial office ==
Between 1990 and 1998, Jähnichen served as regional Secretary of State for Food, Forests and Agriculture. Following a reconfiguration in 1998, he became Secretary of State for the Environment and Agriculture. He was succeeded in 1999 by Steffen Flath.
