= Ludwig Külz =

German physician

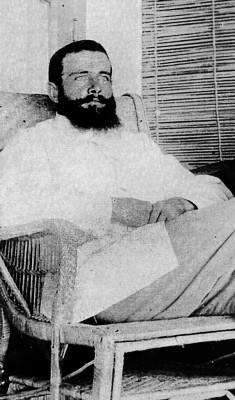
Ludwig Külz

Ludwig Külz (18 February 1875 – 1938) was a German colonial physician born in Borna. He was a twin brother to liberal politician Wilhelm Külz (1875–1948).

Ludwig Külz earned his medical doctorate in 1899, and became a doctor with the German Imperial Navy. From 1902 until 1912 he was a colonial doctor in Togo and Kamerun, where he was tasked with dealing with the problem of malaria. Külz used medical arguments such as malaria prevention to justify the racial between blacks and whites in the German colonies as hygienically necessary.

With ophthalmologist Alfred Leber (1881-1954), he was part of a mission to German New Guinea (Medizinisch-demographischen Deutsch-Neuguinea-Expedition) in 1913–14. On this expedition was artist Emil Nolde (1867-1956), who created ethnographic paintings of New Guinea.

In 1915 he was promoted to senior medical officer, soon afterwards becoming a naval chief physician (1916).

His best-known publication is Tropenarzt im Afrikanischen Busch, a book that involved Külz's experiences with tropical medicine in Africa.
