= Radical Democratic Party (Germany) =

Radical Democratic Party Radikaldemokratische Partei
- Leader: Willy Braubach
- Founded: 30 November 1930
- Dissolved: 1933
- Split from: German State Party
- Ideology: Liberalism; Republicanism; Pacifism; Radical democracy

The Radical Democratic Party (German: Radikaldemokratische Partei, RDP) was a minor left-liberal political party in the late German Republic from 1930 to 1933. The party advocated for social liberalism, pacifism, and radical democracy and was in support of republicanism.

The RDP was founded on 30 November 1930 by former members of the German Democratic Party (DDP) who rejected its merger into the German State Party. Notable foundering members of the party included Ludwig Quidde and Hellmut von Gerlach. The pacifists were supported by the left wing of the Young Democrats (Germany, pre-1992). The Berlin lawyer Willy Braubach was elected party chairman.

Besides Berlin, the RDP's organisational focus was in the Ruhr, and in the Nuremberg-Fürth area. Through its existence, the party only ever achieved minor significance; In 1931, the RDP was briefly represented in the Hessian Landtag after former DDP members Julius Reiber and Johann Eberle defected to the RDP. These seats were lost however in the 1931 Hessian state election, with the RDP receiving 0.6% of the vote and no seats. The RDP also failed to win any seats in the November 1932 German federal election, the only Reichstag election the RDP contested independently, achieving just 3,793 votes.

The party formed an electoral alliance with the Social Democratic Party of Germany (SPD). Unusually for a non-social democratic organisation, the RDP also participated in the republican Iron Front group.

== Political platform ==
In 1931, the RDP adopted a program in which they described themselves as "fighters for national and international ideals of community" and as "radically democratic and convinced republicans." In foreign policy, they committed themselves to pacifism, a liberal cultural policy, and a radically social and anti-plutocratic economic and social policy.

As a social-liberal party, the RDP advocated for a socially just economy within the framework of a free-market economy. The RDP also took an anti-militarist stance, demanding a reduction in the defence budget, and advocated for multi-lateral disarmament. The RDP also strongly opposed the rapidly rising reactionary nationalism of the late German Republic.

== See also ==
- Political parties in Weimar Germany

== Literature ==
- Lexikon zur Parteiengeschichte. 3: Gesamtverband Deutscher Angestelltengewerkschaften - Reichs- und Freikonservative Partei, Köln: Pahl-Rugenstein, 1985, ISBN 978-3-7609-0878-6
- Gutleben, Burkhard (1988). "Radikaldemokraten im Hessischen Landtag. Parlamentarische Episode einer Splitterpartei" [Radical Democrats in the Hessian State Parliament: A Parliamentary Episode of a Splinter Party]. Zeitschrift des Vereins für Hessische Geschichte und Landeskunde (in German). 93: 179–186. ISSN 0342-3107.
- Liepach, Martin (1997). "Radikale Demokraten in der Mitte. Die RDP in der hessischen Landtagswahl 1931" [Radical Democrats in the center: The RDP in the Election to the Hesse Landtag in 1931]. Historical Social Research (in German). ISSN 0172-6404.
