= Gustav Friedrich Dinter =

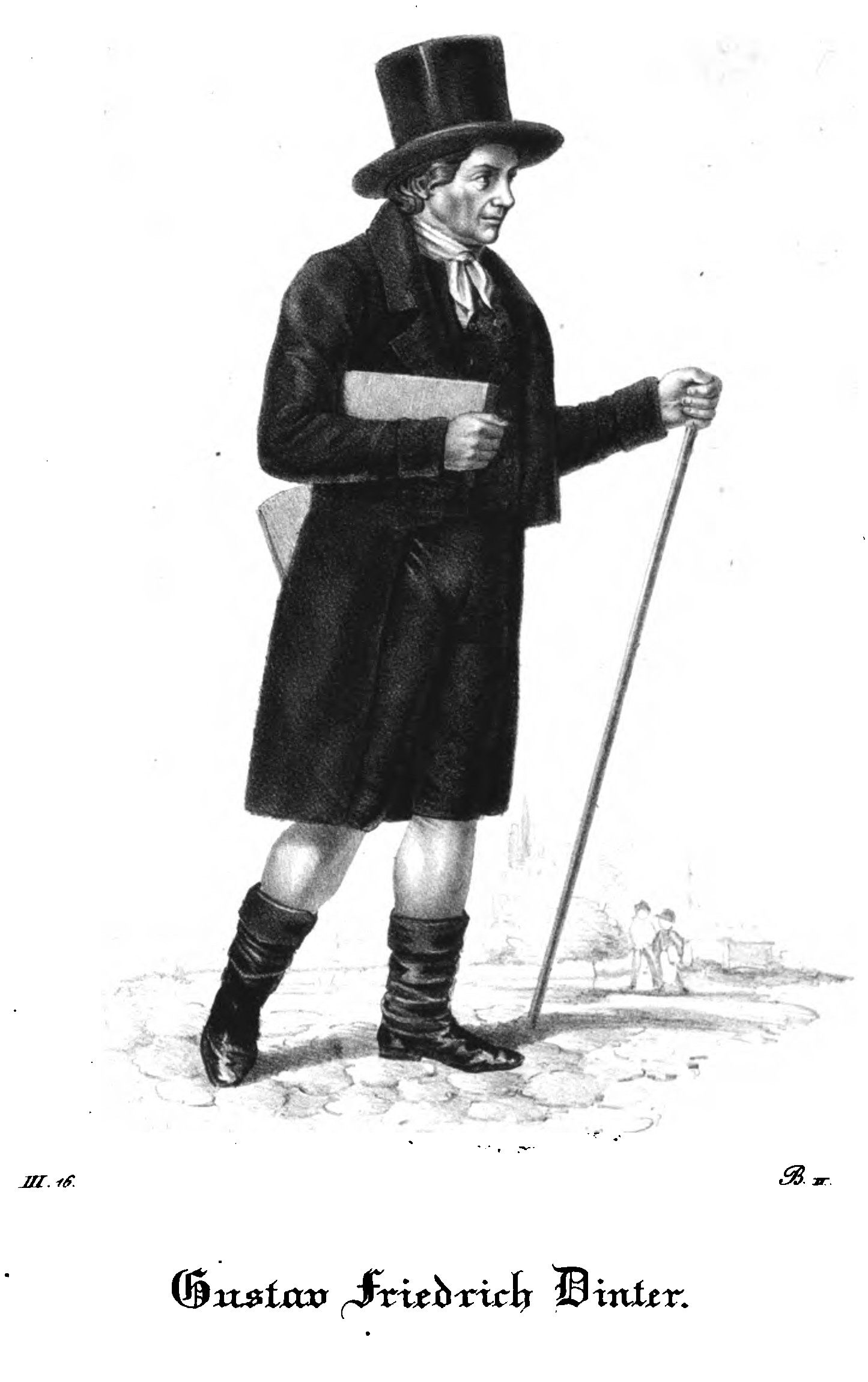
- Lithograph, 1837

Gustav Friedrich Dinter (1760–1831) was a German pedagogue, theologian and author.

== Biography ==
He was born at Borna. He studied theology and pedagogy at Leipzig; held several pastorates, was appointed director of the Teachers' Seminary at Dresden in 1797, and became professor of theology at the University of Königsberg in 1822.

He was liberal in his religious views, and practical in his methods of education. His lectures and writings were distinguished by remarkable clearness of exposition. The seminary at Dresden flourished under his management.

== Works ==
He was a prolific author and wrote more than sixty distinct works. They include:

- Die vorzüglichsten Regeln der Katechetik (“The best rules for teaching religion,” 1802; 13th ed. 1862)
- Malwina, ein Buch für Mütter (“Malwina, a book for mothers,” 1818; 5th ed. 1860)
- Unterredungen über die Hauptstücke des lutheranischen Katechismus (“Discussions of the main points of the Lutheran catechism,” 1806–23; frequently reprinted)
