= Thorsten Görke =

German footballer

Personal information
- Date of birth: 22 September 1976 (age 50)
- Place of birth: Borna, East Germany
- Height: 1.79 m (5 ft 10 1/2 in)
- Position: Defensive midfielder

Youth career
- –1995: VfB Leipzig

Senior career*
Years	Team	Apps	(Gls)
1995–2002	VfB Leipzig		
2002–2004	Erzgebirge Aue	30	(2)
2004–2005	Carl Zeiss Jena	32	(3)
2005–2006	Chemnitzer FC	31	(8)
2006–2007	Rot-Weiß Erfurt	20	(3)
2007–2010	Hallescher FC	63	(9)
2010–2012	Lokomotive Leipzig	37	(4)
2012–2013	VfB IMO Merseburg	20	(3)
- * Club domestic league appearances and goals

Thorsten Görke (born 22 September 1976) is a German former footballer.
