= Democratic Party of Germany =

Democratic Party of Germany Demokratische Partei Deutschlands
- Leader: Theodor Heuss, Wilhelm Külz
- Founded: March 17, 1947
- Dissolved: January 1948
- Merger of: Liberal Democratic Party (Berlin and Soviet zone), Free Democratic Party (British zone), Democratic People's Party (Württemberg-Baden), other regional parties
- Succeeded by: Free Democratic Party (West Germany); Liberal Democratic Party (East Germany)
- Headquarters: Frankfurt am Main and Berlin
- Ideology: Liberalism (German)

The Democratic Party of Germany (German: Demokratische Partei Deutschlands, DPD) was founded in 1947 as a German liberal party and is the forerunner of the Free Democratic Party (FDP) in the current Federal Republic of Germany.

== History ==
Shortly after the end of World War II, bourgeois-liberal organizations were founded, which referred mainly to the traditions of the left-liberal German Democratic Party (DDP), the national-liberal German People's Party (DVP) and the Democratic People's Party (DVP) in the southwestern state of Württemberg. Their aim was to overcome the traditional division of German liberalism into a national-liberal and a left-liberal strain.

Due to the division of Germany into four occupation zones and the lack of a political system of Germany as a whole, these parties organised "from the bottom up" on local, state and regional levels. Among these regional liberal parties were the Liberal Democratic Party (LDP) active in Greater Berlin and the Soviet occupation zone (licensed by the Soviet Military Administration in Germany as early as July 1945), the Free Democratic Party (FDP) of the British zone, the Democratic People's Party (DVP) of Württemberg-Baden, the Liberal-Democratic Party of Hesse, the Free Democratic Party of Bavaria and the Bremen Democratic People's Party (BDVP).

Representatives of these parties decided in July 1946 to establish an all-German coordination committee. The committee first met in November 1946 in Coburg (in the absence of the DVP of Württemberg) to prepare the foundation of an all-German liberal party.

As a consequence the DPD was founded on March 17, 1947 at a conference in Rothenburg ob der Tauber, attended by liberal politicians from all four zones. Theodor Heuss (Democratic People's Party of Württemberg-Baden, American zone) and Wilhelm Külz (Liberal Democratic Party of the Soviet zone) were chosen as co-leaders. The headquarters of the party were in Frankfurt am Main and Berlin.

Külz's participation in the "First German People's Congress for Unity and a Just Peace", initiated by the pro-Soviet Socialist Unity Party of Germany (SED) in December 1947 caused resentment both within the LDP and among liberals in the Western zones. On January 18, 1948, the DPD executive board convened in Frankfurt, but Külz was absent. Theodor Heuss accused the East German LDP of having "opted for the Russian conception of German unity" and requested to "draw the necessary consequences". Arthur Lieutenant of the LDP answered that further cooperation of his party was "impossible for the time being". The DPD was thereby effectively disbanded and decomposed again into its regional and state associations.

After Külz died in April 1948, no new co-chair was elected. The Liberal Democratic Party of East Germany became a bloc party that was increasingly dependent of the dominant Socialist Unity Party. The liberal parties of the three Western zones, on the other hand, merged into the Free Democratic Party (FDP) in December 1948, that became the third major party of West Germany.
