= Torsten Jülich =

German footballer

Personal information
- Date of birth: 1 December 1974 (age 51)
- Place of birth: Borna, East Germany
- Height: 1.78 m (5 ft 10 in)
- Position: Defender

Youth career
- –1987: Aktivist Borna
- 1987–1993: VfB Leipzig

Senior career*
Years	Team	Apps	(Gls)
1996–2003	VfB Leipzig	135	(7)
2003–2007	Eintracht Braunschweig	88	(1)
2007–2008	1. FC Saarbrücken	33	(1)
2008–2010	Lokomotive Leipzig	58	(3)
Total		314	(12)
- * Club domestic league appearances and goals

Torsten Jülich (born 1 December 1974 in Borna, East Germany) is a German former football player.

== Career ==
He made his debut on the professional league level in the 2. Bundesliga for VfB Leipzig on 1 March 1997 when he came on as a substitute for Ronald Werner in the 85th minute in a game against 1. FSV Mainz 05.
