= Der Morgen =

Der Morgen

Der Morgen (The Morning) was a daily newspaper published in the GDR. Der Morgen was the central organ of the Liberal Democratic Party of Germany. It was published from 3 August 1945 on, six times a week. The premises of the first issue declared as its goal to become trumpet of the liberal democratic bourgeoisie.

During the Wende, it was the first newspaper in the GDR to renounce the dominance of the SED and to tolerate contributions and letters from readers, which treated critically the GDR system of the time. In February 1990, Der Morgen became the first GDR newspaper which covered the Stalinist purges in Germany.

In July 1990, the newspaper was taken over by Axel-springer-Verlag. From that time on, the editorial board included journalists from both East and West Germany, most of them had come from Der Spiegel or Tageszeitung. Under its new editor-in-chief, Der Morgen adjusted itself a new profile, and wrote a series of articles on the finances of PDS and the previous links of various politicians with Stasi. The editors Jan von Flocken, Erwin Jurtschitsch and Michael Klonovsky were awarded Wächterpreis der Tagespresse for their courageous uncovering and handling the human rights violations by the GDR justice.

In Autumn 1990, Der Morgen merged with the newspaper of the NDPD (another former blockpartei), Berliner Allgemeine. Although Der Morgen was appreciated by the critics for its style of journalism and had been given guarantees by its new owners, less than a year later the Springer syndicate closed it on 11 June 1991. This decision was urged by Springer manager Erhard van Straaten, who disapproved of the liberal stance of the editorial staff of the newspaper. Der Morgen had also become a competitor of the conservative-leaning Die Welt of the same syndicate.
