= Alfred Leber =

German ophthalmologist (1881–1954)

Alfred Theodor Leber (March 7, 1881 – 1954) was a German ophthalmologist born in Antwerp. He was a nephew of renowned ophthalmologist Theodor Leber (1840-1917). Alfred Leber is considered to be the founder of German tropical ophthalmology.

He studied at the Berlin Eye Clinic under Julius von Michel (1843-1911). In 1910-11 with parasitologist Stanislaus von Prowazek (1875-1915) of the Hamburg Tropical Institute, he was a member of a scientific expedition to Samoa, where he worked as a private lecturer. It was here that Leber discovered the effects on the eye caused by filarial infections by the parasite Wuchereria bancrofti. In 1912 he worked as a senior physician under Arthur von Hippel (1841-1916) at Göttingen.

In 1913-14 he took part in the Medizinisch-demographische Deutsch-Neuguinea-Expedition to German New Guinea with physician Ludwig Külz (1875-1938) and painter Emil Nolde (1867-1956). At the outbreak of World War I, he along with writer Max Dauthendey (1867-1918) were unable to return to Germany, and spent the war years in the neutral Dutch East Indies. At Madang, Java he became a director in a hospital for eye and tropical diseases, and it was in Leber's clinic that Max Dauthendey died from malaria in August, 1918.

After the war, Leber was unable to procure a position at the University of Göttingen, so he returned to work in Madang. During World War II he spent much of his time interned at a camp for German prisoners in Dehradun, India, and after his release became head of ophthalmology at the Prince of Wales Hospital in Bhopal. In 1952 he became director of the Institute of Ophthalmology at Aligarh Muslim University in Aligarh.
