= Horst Pehnert =

East German journalist

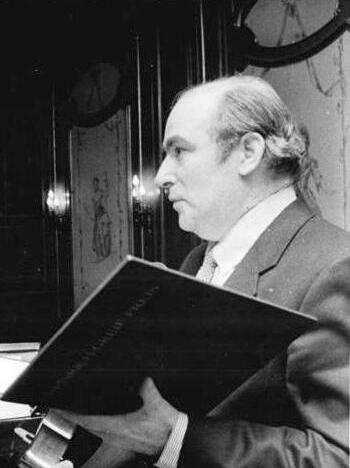
Horst Pehnert 1984

Horst Pehnert (3 November 1932 – 1 April 2013) was an East German journalist and party official who in 1976 became a long-standing deputy Minister for Culture - effectively the minister for film and cinema.

== Life ==
=== Early years ===
Horst Pehnert was born in the Saxon village of Neunkirchen, a short distance to the south of Leipzig. His father was a tailor. Much of his childhood coincided with the Second World War. Unlike many who later became journalists in East Germany, he did not hasten to sit the exams that would have enabled him to progress directly to university, but undertook between 1947 and 1950 a traineeship in printing and book production.

=== Political networking and a career in journalism ===
Soon after the war, which ended in May 1945, Pehnert joined the Free German Youth ("Freie Deutsche Jugend" / FDJ), which within the Soviet occupation zone was being built up as the youth wing of the zone's newly emerged ruling Socialist Unity Party ("Sozialistische Einheitspartei Deutschlands" / SED). In October 1949 the Soviet occupation zone was relaunched as the German Democratic Republic (East Germany), a separated Soviet sponsored German state with political and socio-economic structures modeled on those of the Soviet Union itself. In 1950 he undertook a "young journalists' course", and between 1950 and 1954 he contributed as a journalist to "Junge Welt", at that time the official daily newspaper of the FDJ.

In 1954, a little belatedly, Pehnert embarked on a three-year degree level course in journalism at Leipzig University. In 1955 he joined the young country's ruling SED (party). The university's prestigious faculty of journalism came under the direct control of the party's powerful Central Committee, and was known informally by the epithet "Red Abbey" ("Rote Kloster"), which was a reference to its faithful support for the party line.

In 1956, shortly before he emerged with a university degree, Pehnert returned to "Junge Welt", now as a contributing editor. He would remain with the newspaper till 1971, promoted to deputy managing editor in 1962 and succeeding Dieter Kerschek as editor in chief in 1966.

While this was going on, between 1965 and 1971 Pehnert was a member of the Central Council of the FDJ, which was the movement's controlling body. Official endorsement came in 1968 when he was awarded the Patriotic Order of Merit in bronze. Shortly before his fortieth birthday, however, in 1971 he resigned from the editorship with "Junge Welt". His successor was Klaus Raddatz.

=== Switch to television ===
In 1971 he was appointed deputy chairman of the National Television Committee, a political body charged with directing and monitoring the national television service on behalf of the ruling party. With the recent introduction of colour television he presided at a time when television output was enjoying growing popularity.

=== Minister ===
On 1 December 1976 Pehnert switched to the Culture Ministry. Here he was placed in charge of the Film and Cinema National Administration and given the title "Deputy Culture Minister". The position was a challenging one: since 1954 there had been eight different incumbents. His immediate predecessor had been Hans Starke. Horst Pehnert would stay in post for more than thirteen years.

"We were the producers. And producers, whether private, statutory or governmental have the right now and again to a say, when it costs so much money to produce movies.”
"Wir waren die Produzenten! Und Produzenten, ob private, öffentlich-rechtliche oder staatliche, haben nun mal das Recht mitzureden, wenn es darum geht, mit sehr viel Geld Filme herzustellen."

Horst Pehnert, quoted in 2009

Known informally as the "Film Minister", Pehnert, along with Hans Dieter Mäde, the Director General of DEFA, the state-owned film studio, was now, subject to Politburo oversight, responsible for approval or amendment of films shown in the German Democratic Republic. He was in effect the nation's film censor, though he himself rejected any suggestion of state censorship. From 1978 he was, in addition, a member of the presidium of the Film and Television Council. Within the party apparatus, his principal interlocutor was Jürgen Harder, who had responsibility for cinema films within the culture department of the party Central Committee. A close working partnership developed between Pehnert and Harder, to the point where one commentator described their relationship as "symbiotic".

Pehnert's time in office saw an exodus of national stars such as Manfred Krug after the government stripped Wolf Biermann of his citizenship and expelled him from the country. He presided over the ban in 1981 on the film "Jadup und Boel" by Rainer Simon, over the temporary closing down of the documentary film studio of Heynowski and Scheumann, and over the blocking in 1988 of critical Glasnost inspired Soviet films. On a more positive note, successful films of the period included "Solo Sunny" (Wolf and Kohlhaase, 1980), "Die Verlobte" (Günther Rücker, 1980) and "Die Beunruhigung" (Lothar Warneke, 1981).

=== Later years ===
After the upheavals of 1989 and the ensuing demise of the German Democratic Republic as a separate state, Pehnert took early retirement in 1990. The old Socialist Unity Party reinvented itself for a democratic future, part of which involved rebranding itself as the Party of Democratic Socialism (PDS). Horst Pehnert remained a member, participating in local government as a town councillor for Zeuthen where he was now living. In addition, he served as a member of the district council ("Kreistag") for the wider Dahme-Spreewald district.

Pehnert also embarked on a late flowering career as an author: His memoirs appeared in 2009. A reviewer writing in the Berliner Zeitung was disappointed, stating that the book appeared primarily to be "a justification for his own thirteen ministerial years" ("eine Rechtfertigungsschrift für seine eigenen dreizehn Ministerjahre").
