= National League of German Democratic Youth Clubs =

Movement in Weimar Germany

The National League of German Democratic Youth Clubs (German: Reichsbund der Deutschen Demokratischen Jugend) was a political youth movement in Weimar Germany, functioning as the youth wing of the German Democratic Party (DDP). The organization was founded in April 1919 and was led by Max Weissner. The club spoke out with other youth clubs against "the excessive claims of the princes." During the initial phase of the Weimar Republic, the youth league had around 20,000 members across Germany. However, the organization went into a spiral of decline. By the end of 1926 its membership was below 2,300.
