= Wilhelm Külz =

German politician (1875–1948)

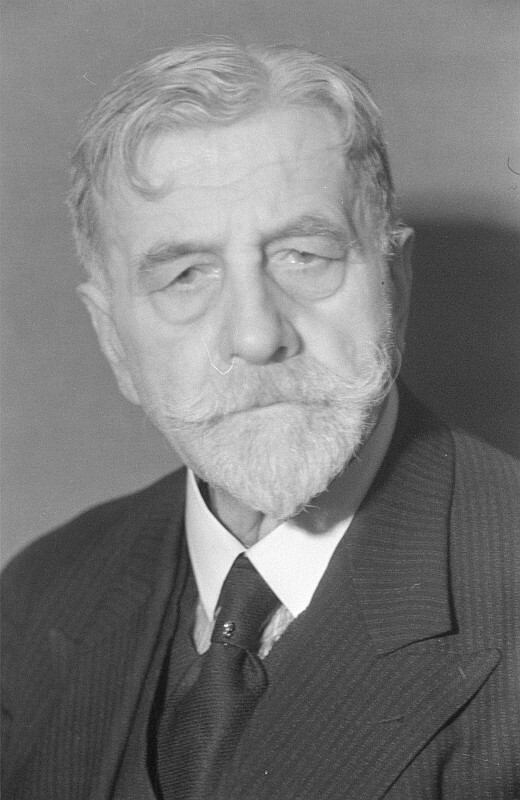
- Külz in 1946

Minister of the Interior Weimar Republic
- In office 20 January 1926 – 1 February 1927
- Chancellor: Hans Luther (1926); Wilhelm Marx (1926–1927)
- Preceded by: Otto Geßler
- Succeeded by: Walter von Keudell

Personal details
- Born: 18 February 1875 Borna, Kingdom of Saxony, German Empire
- Died: 10 April 1948 (aged 73) Berlin, Allied-occupied Germany
- Party: German Democratic Party (1918–1933); Liberal Democratic Party of Germany (1945–1948)
- Spouse: Erna Freymond
- Education: University of Leipzig; University of Tübingen
- Occupation: Lawyer, politician, civil servant

Wilhelm Külz (18 February 1875 – 10 April 1948) was a German liberal politician of the National Liberal Party, the German Democratic Party (DDP) and later the Liberal Democratic Party of Germany (LDPD). He held public office both in the German Empire and in the Weimar Republic. In 1926, he served as interior minister of Germany in the cabinets of chancellors Hans Luther and Wilhelm Marx.

== Early life ==
Külz was born on 18 February 1875 at Borna near Leipzig in the Kingdom of Saxony. He was the son of Otto Külz (1839–1921), a Protestant priest, and his wife Anna (1849–1914, née Paschasius). He had a sister, Käthe (1878–1924) and a twin brother, Ludwig (1875–1938). Hailing from a conservative family, Wilhelm studied law at the University of Leipzig. He then served in the military (as Reserveleutnant).

Külz married Erna Freymond (1881–1963) in 1901. They had one son, Helmut. Also in 1901, he was awarded a doctorate at the Staatswissenschaftliche Fakultät of the University of Tübingen with a thesis on the peacetime strength of the army. He then joined the civil service, working at various courts and as city councillor at Leipzig, Hainichen, Zittau and Meerane. In 1904, he became mayor of Bückeburg and president of the Landtag of the Principality of Schaumburg-Lippe. As an expert in administration, the Reichskolonialamt (the Imperial ministry for the colonies) made him Reichskommissar of the colony German South-West Africa, where he worked on establishing self-government in 1907 to 1908.

After returning to Bückeburg, Külz was a Reichstag candidate for the National Liberals in 1912 but was not elected. The same year, he was elected Oberbürgermeister (mayor) of Zittau, an office that he held until 1923.

During World War I, Külz served as Hauptmann (captain) and Kompanieführer.

== Weimar Republic ==
In 1919, he joined the German Democratic Party (DDP), which he represented first in the Weimar National Assembly and then from 1922 to 1932 in the Reichstag. In 1923, he was elected as 2. Bürgermeister of Dresden.

In 1926 to 1927, Külz served as Reichsminister des Innern (interior minister) in the second cabinet of Hans Luther and the third cabinet of Wilhelm Marx.

Elected as Oberbürgermeister (mayor) of Dresden in 1931, Külz was removed from office by the Reichskommissar for Saxony in March 1933, after he had refused to hoist a flag with the Nazi swastika over city hall. Until 1945, he was active as a private entrepreneur.

== Postwar ==
After 1945, he took a leading role in establishing the Liberal Democratic Party of Germany (LDPD). He founded the Berlin branch of the LDPD in the summer of 1945 and acted as LDPD chairman from November 1945 after the first leader, Waldemar Koch, had been deposed by Soviet orders.

On 17 March 1947, in a conference in Rothenburg ob der Tauber Külz and Theodor Heuss were elected co-chairmen of the planned Democratic Party of Germany (DPD), aimed at uniting liberals of both the Soviet and the Western occupation zones.

The plans were never realised since Wilhelm Külz, unlike the East German CDU leader, Jakob Kaiser, participated in the SED-dominated Deutscher Volkskongress (German People's Congress for Unity and True Peace) that took place on 6 December 1947. That brought about internal confrontations both within the LDPD as well as between the East and West German partners in the DPD. Although the LDPD leadership criticised that participation, it was unable to take any further steps demanded by the West German liberals.

During a session of the united leadership of the DPD that took place on 18 January 1948, which Külz refused to attend, Heuss argued that the Liberal Democrats' unwillingness to take any measures against Külz proved their commitment to "the Russian conception of German unity". Arthur Lieutenant, the spokesman of the LDPD on the matter, declared that under those circumstances and considering reproaches laid against East German liberals, no further co-operation was possible. That was in fact the end of DPD.

Together with Otto Nuschke (CDU) and Wilhelm Pieck (SED), Wilhelm Külz led the German People's Council (Deutscher Volksrat), forerunner of Volkskammer of GDR. From 1945 on, Külz was the publisher of the LDPD daily Der Morgen.

In March 1948, Külz once again was the representative of the LDPD at the Deutscher Volkskongress, organized at the behest of the Soviet authorities and the SED.

On the morning of 10 April 1948, Külz was found by his party deputy, Arthur Lieutenant, to have died in the night at his Berlin apartment, apparently from a heart attack.

== Legacy ==
Although he was mostly unknown in West Germany and still is in Germany, Külz was viewed in East Germany as a prime example of a bourgeois but upright citizen who found his way to socialism. He was seen as one of the founding fathers of East Germany.

Wilhelm-Külz-Stiftung, a foundation close to the Free Democratic Party, is named after him.

== Bibliography ==
- Külz, Wilhelm (1989), Robel, Hergard (ed.), Ein Liberaler zwischen Ost und West: Aufzeichnungen 1947–1948 (in German), Munich: Oldenbourg, ISBN 3-486-54101-3.

== Sources ==
- Schneider, Werner (1978), Die Deutsche Demokratische Partei in der Weimarer Republik: 1924–1930 (in German), Munich: Fink, ISBN 3-7705-1549-8.

Party political offices
Preceded by Waldemar Koch	Chairman of the Liberal Democratic Party of Germany; 1945–1948	Succeeded by Arthur Lieutenant
