= Otto Nuschke =

German politician (1883–1957)

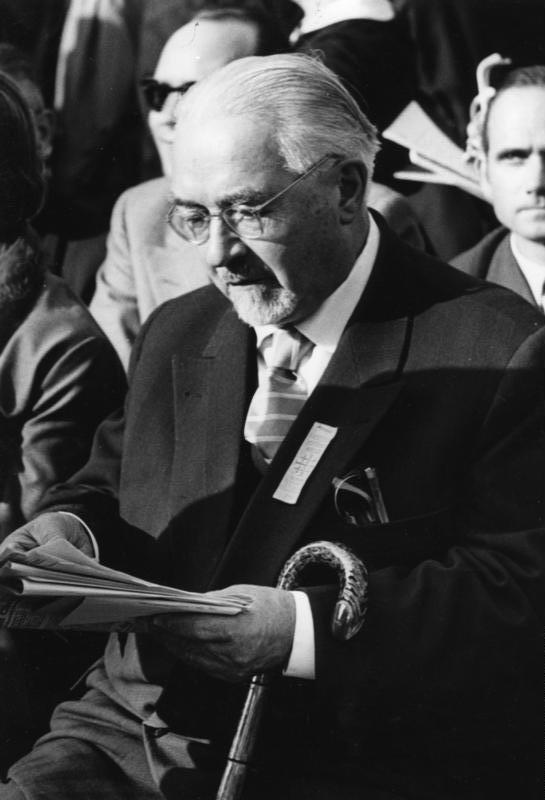

Chairman of the Christian Democratic Union
- In office 1948–1957
- Preceded by: Jakob Kaiser
- Succeeded by: August Bach

Member of the Volkskammer
- In office 1949–1957

Member of the Landtag of Prussia
- In office 1921–1933

Personal details
- Born: February 23, 1883 Frohburg, German Empire
- Died: December 27, 1957 (aged 74) Hennigsdorf, German Democratic Republic
- Resting place: Dorotheenstadt Cemetery, Berlin
- Party: Christian Democratic Union (East Germany) (1945-); German State Party (1930-1933); German Democratic Party (1918-1930); Progressive People's Party (1910-1918); Free-minded Union (1906-1910)
- Education: Hochschule für Grafik und Buchkunst Leipzig

Military service
- Allegiance: German Empire
- Branch/service: Imperial German Army
- Rank: Private
- Unit: 2nd Army; Guards Corps; Garde-Landsturm-Infanterie-Bataillon Zossen
- Battles/wars: First World War

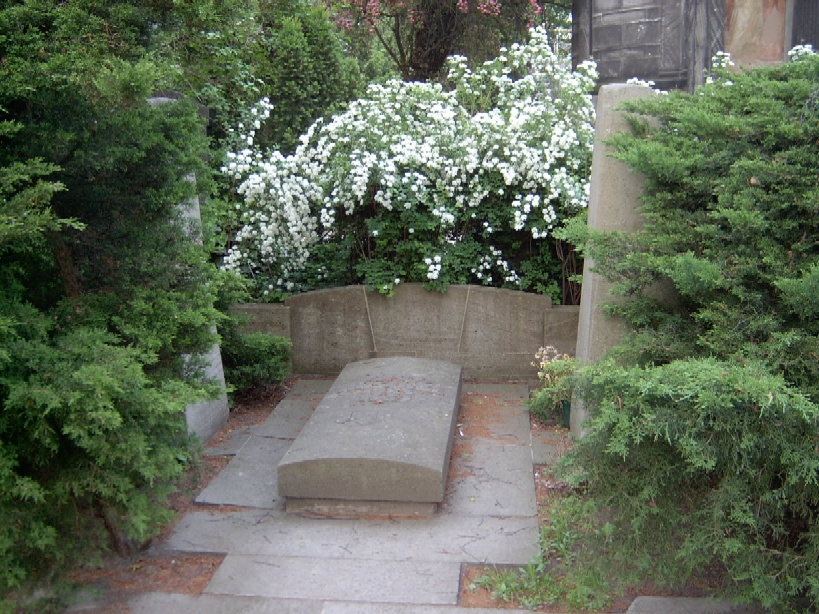
Grave of Otto Nuschke

Otto Nuschke (23 February 1883 – 27 December 1957) was a German politician. Nuschke was born in Frohburg in the Kingdom of Saxony. In 1910 he was elected secretary general of the liberal Progressive People's Party (Fortschrittliche Volkspartei) of Kassel. In the same year he became chief editor of the Berliner Tageblatt and in 1915 co-editor of the Berliner Volkszeitung. Nuschke soon joined the Liberal Union (Freisinnige Vereinigung), left-wing liberal organisation, and became its secretary general of Kassel in 1906. As this group fused with other left-liberal organisations (in 1910) to form the Progressive People's Party, Nuschke became the secretary general of the new party in Kassel.

In 1918, Nuschke took part in establishing the German Democratic Party. In 1919, he was a delegate to the Weimar National Assembly that drafted the Weimar Constitution and, from 1921 to 1933, he was a member of the Landtag of Prussia. In 1920s Nuschke was at times the deputy chairman of the German Democratic Party. Nuschke was one of the founders of the republican Reichsbanner Schwarz-Rot-Gold and became the secretary general of the German State Party in 1931 (i.e., a successor to the German Democratic Party). After the Nazis gained power in 1933, Nuschke joined the opposition. After the 1944 assassination attempt on Hitler's life, he went into hiding.

After World War II, Nuschke became involved in the politics of the Soviet Occupation Zone (SBZ)--what became East Germany. Unlike most of the former German Democratic Party members, Nuschke did not take part in forming the LDPD/FDP, but became one of the co-founders of the Christian Democratic Union (CDU) in June 1945, along with Ferdinand Friedensburg, Ernst Lemmer and Walther Schreiber. In 1946, Nuschke was elected in the party's executive committee. From 1946 to 1952, he was a member of the Landtag of Brandenburg. In 1947, after the deposition of party chairmen Jakob Kaiser and Ernst Lemmer by the Soviet military authorities, Nuschke became acting chairman and after the party congress of 1948, party chairman.

In March 1948, Nuschke—alongside Wilhelm Pieck (SED) and Wilhelm Külz (LDPD)—was chairman of the German People's Council (Deutscher Volksrat) that drafted the Constitution of the German Democratic Republic. In 1949 Nuschke became a member of the Provisional People's Chamber of the GDR. He remained a member of parliament until his death. After the formal establishment of the German Democratic Republic, Nuschke became Deputy Prime Minister and chief of the Church Office.

Nuschke was a loyal supporter of the SED regime, and gradually pushed out those CDU members not willing to do the Communists' bidding. This culminated in the party's 1952 conference, at which the CDU formally declared itself a socialist party. On 17 June 1953, during the East German uprising, Nuschke and his driver were kidnapped and brought to West Berlin. Some American military recognised him and saved him from the angry masses. He and his driver were brought to a police station, but released on 19 June. After that Nuschke and his driver returned to East Berlin. In a spontaneous interview given to RIAS reporter Peter Schultze, Nuschke claimed that the East German government had popular support and that the demonstrators included West Berliners.

In 1954, he received the Patriotic Order of the GDR and, in 1955, he received an honorary degree.

== See also ==
- German Democratic Republic
- Christian Democratic Union (East Germany)
