= Liberal Democratic Party of Germany =

German political party

Liberal Democratic Party of Germany Liberal-Demokratische Partei Deutschlands
- Chairman: Waldemar Koch (first); Rainer Ortleb (last)
- Founded: 5 July 1945
- Dissolved: 27 March 1990
- Merged into: Association of Free Democrats (party)
- Headquarters: East Berlin, East Germany
- Newspaper: Der Morgen
- Membership (1987): 106,000
- Ideology: 1945–1949, 1990: Liberalism; Economic liberalism; Modern liberalism (1989–1990); Liberal democracy (1945–1949; faction); 1950–1990: Liberal socialism; Liberal democracy; Humanism; Socialism (1967–1990)
- National affiliation: Democratic Bloc (1945–1950); National Front (1950–1990); Association of Free Democrats (1990)
- Colours: Black, red, yellow (national colours)

Party flag

The Liberal Democratic Party of Germany (German: Liberal-Demokratische Partei Deutschlands, LDPD) was a political party in East Germany. Like the other allied bloc parties of the Socialist Unity Party of Germany (SED) in the National Front, it had 52 representatives in the People's Chamber.

== Foundation ==
The history of the party dates back to 16 June 1945, when a Berlin-based group led by Waldemar Koch and his father-in-law Eugen Schiffer took the initiative in refounding the Weimar-era German Democratic Party. Koch was elected chair of the founding committee, with Wilhelm Külz as his deputy; the writer Franz Xaver Kappus joined the board as well. At first there were some conversations about forming a united centre-right democratic party with the Christian Democrats, but the idea was abandoned soon and the name was changed to Liberal Democratic Party ("Liberal-Demokratische Partei", LDP) before the party's official founding on 5 July 1946.

It was first of all aimed at uniting Weimar Republic-era members of the German Democratic Party, German People's Party and German National People's Party. Unlike the East German Christian Democratic Union (CDU), the Liberal Democratic Party was firmly for private ownership and opposed to nationalization of important private enterprises. Among the new anti-fascist parties, Liberal Democratic Party was the most anti-communist at the time.

After internal fighting and under pressure from Soviet authorities, Koch was replaced with the more pliable Wilhelm Külz in November 1945.

In the last free election, in 1946, the Liberal Democrats finished third, behind the SED and the CDU. At the end of 1948, during the culmination of their opposition to the SED seizure of power, the LDP had more than 200,000 members, 23% of whom were younger than 25.

== Unification attempts ==
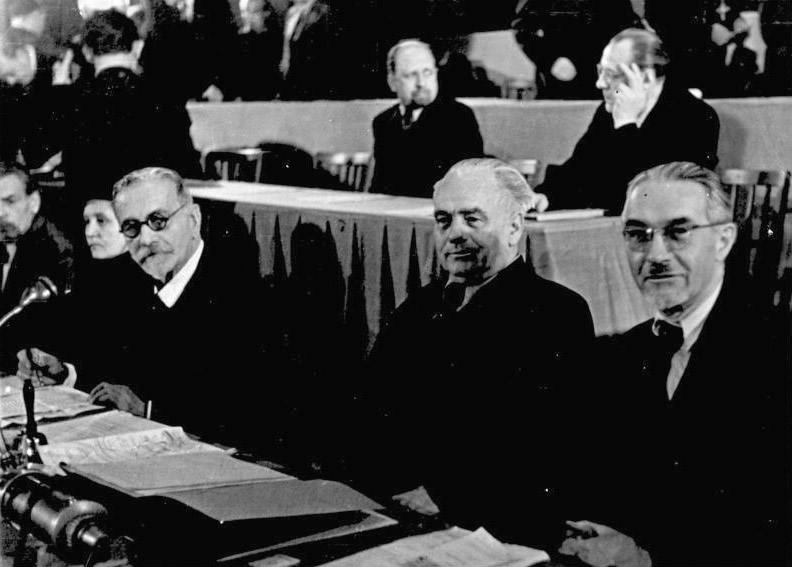
Wilhelm Külz (left) in December 1947 with Wilhelm Pieck (SED) and Otto Nuschke (CDU) at the "People's Congress"

In July 1946, the LDP and the liberal parties in the Western Zones founded a joint Coordination committee with the aim of forming an All-Germany liberal party (Demokratische Partei Deutschlands, DPD). The founding of the Democratic Party of Germany began with a conference in Rothenburg ob der Tauber on 17 March 1947. Wilhelm Külz and Theodor Heuss (representing Western liberals) acted as co-chairmen. Such undertakings failed quickly, owing to Külz's participation in the SED-sponsored German People's Congress for Unity and Just Peace.

The failure of unification became imminent when at a session of the united leadership of DPD that took part on 18 January 1948 and which Külz refused to attend, Theodor Heuss argued that the Liberal Democrats' unwillingness to take any measures against Külz proved their commitment to 'the Russian conception of German unity'. Arthur Lieutenant, the spokesman of LDP on the matter, declared that under those circumstances and concerning reproaches laid against East German liberals, any co-operation had been made impossible.

== A Blockpartei ==
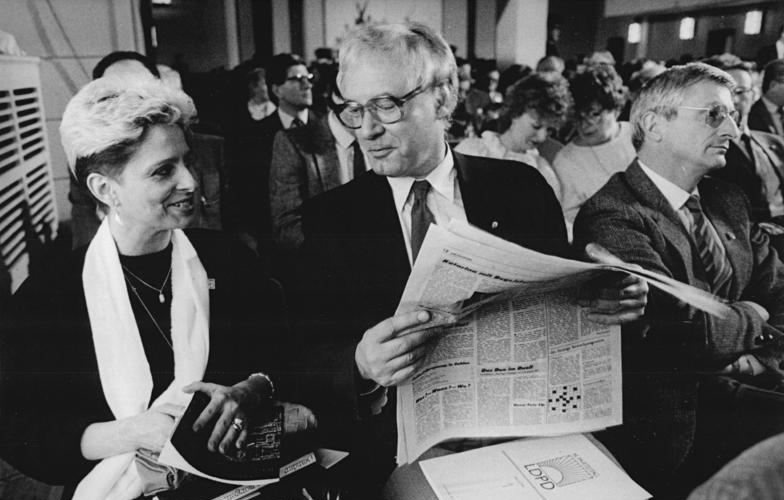
Party convention in 1987, with singer Dagmar Frederic and professor Zippel of Charité

After 1949, it shared the same fate as the other legal East German parties. As a bloc party (Blockpartei) of the National Front it jettisoned its original ideology, acting as a "helpmeet" to the Communist Socialist Unity Party of Germany (SED). Another bloc party, the National Democratic Party of Germany (NDPD), appealed to almost the same social groups. In October 1951, the LDP was ordered to add the "D" for "Germany" (Deutschland) into its name in order to serve the SED's all-German propaganda of that time.

LDPD member Johannes Dieckmann was the chairman of the Volkskammer from 1949 to 1969, and as such was ex-officio vice president of the GDR during that time.

The central newspaper of LDPD used to be the daily Der Morgen ("The Morning").

Manfred Gerlach was the Chairman of the Liberal Democratic Party from 1967 to his resignation in 1990. Gerlach had initially been a loyal partner of the SED, but began moving toward a more independent line in the 1980s. At an extraordinary party congress held 9–10 February 1990 in Dresden it returned to genuine liberal policies and dropped "of Germany" from its name. On 12 February 1990 it joined the Association of Free Democrats, which finally merged into the Free Democratic Party (FDP) on 11 August 1990.

== Foreign contacts ==
The LDPD had contacts with other (nominally) liberal parties in the Communist bloc: Polish Democratic Party (Stronnictwo Demokratyczne, SD), the Czechoslovak Socialist Party (Československá strana socialistická, CSS), the Democratic Party of Vietnam and the Korean Democratic Party (Chõson Sahoeminjudang, CS). The Liberal Democratic Party of GDR also had some contacts with the West German FDP; in the 1960s and 1970s, there was limited communication, but relations improved in the 1980s.

== Electoral history ==
=== Volkskammer elections ===
Election	Votes	%	Seats	+/–
1949	as part of Democratic Bloc		45 / 330 (Note: The 1,400 elected members of the Third German People's Congress selected the members of the second German People's Council.)	–
1950	as part of National Front		60 / 400	▲15
1954	as part of National Front		45 / 400	▼15
1958	as part of National Front		45 / 400	Steady
1963	as part of National Front		45 / 434	Steady
1967	as part of National Front		45 / 434	Steady
1971	as part of National Front		45 / 434	Steady
1976	as part of National Front		45 / 434	Steady
1981	as part of National Front		52 / 500	▲7
1986	as part of National Front		52 / 500	Steady
1990	with Association of Free Democrats	5.3%	10 / 400	▼42

== See also ==
- Liberalism
- Contributions to liberal theory
- Liberalism worldwide
- List of liberal parties
- Liberal democracy
- Liberalism in Germany
- Günter Stempel
