= Borna, Leipzig =

Town in Saxony, Germany

Borna
- Town
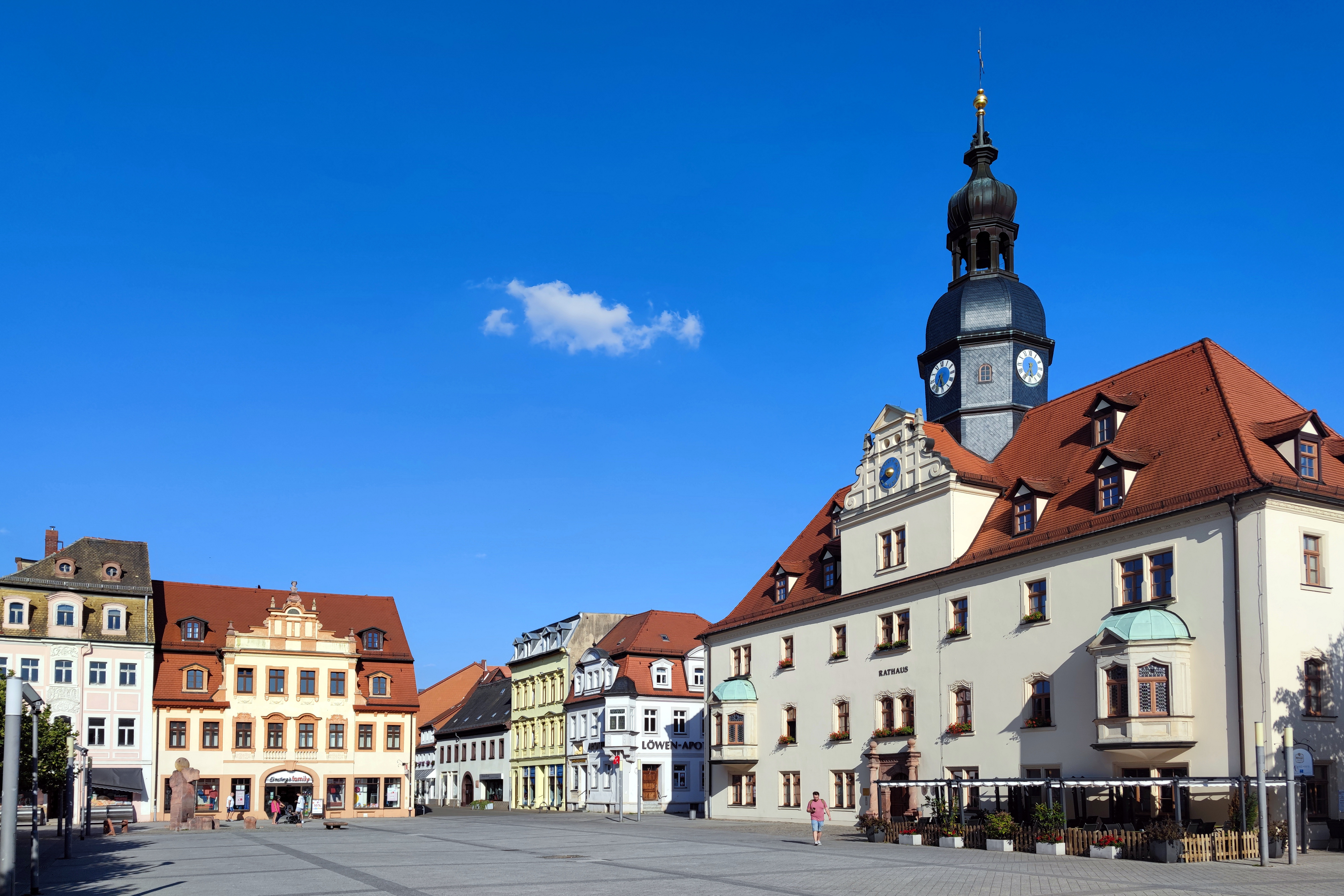

- Coat of arms

- Location of Borna within Leipzig district
- Interactive map of Borna
- Location within Germany Location within Saxony
- Coordinates: 51°7′N 12°30′E
- Country: Germany
- State: Saxony
- District: Leipzig

Government
  - Mayor (2022–29): Oliver Urban (SPD)

Area
  - Total: 62.44 km^{2} (24.11 sq mi)
- Elevation: 159 m (522 ft)

Population (2025-12-31)
  - Total: 20,129
  - Density: 322.4/km^{2} (834.9/sq mi)
- Time zone: UTC+01:00 (CET)
  - Summer (DST): UTC+02:00 (CEST)
- Postal codes: 04552
- Dialling codes: 0 34 33
- Vehicle registration: L, BNA, GHA, GRM, MTL, WUR
- Website: www.borna.de

Borna (German pronunciation: [ˈbɔʁna]) is a town in Saxony, Germany, capital of the Leipzig district. It is situated approximately 30 km southeast of Leipzig city. It has approx. 20,000 inhabitants. The town is the district seat of the district of Leipzig.

== Geography ==
Borna is located about 30 km (19 mi) south of Leipzig. The river Wyhra flows through the town. The surrounding landscape has been influenced by open-cast coal mining.

The town lies in the middle of Central German Metropolitan Region, with Leipzig 33 km (21 mi) distant, Gera 50 km (31 mi), Chemnitz 58 km (36 mi), Halle 67 km (42 mi), and Dresden 113 km (70 mi). Neighboring large towns are Altenburg, 17 km (11 mi) away, Grimma, 24 km (15 mi) and Zeitz 35 km (22 mi).

== History ==
=== Pre-history and Middle Ages ===
The current site of Borna town was originally two settlements; Altstadt (the old town) and Wenigborn. Before the foundation of the town, there had been a water castle since the 9th Century. The first written mention of the town of Borna was recorded in 1251. Borna was burnt to the ground five times during the wars of the Middle Ages.

=== 19th Century Onwards ===
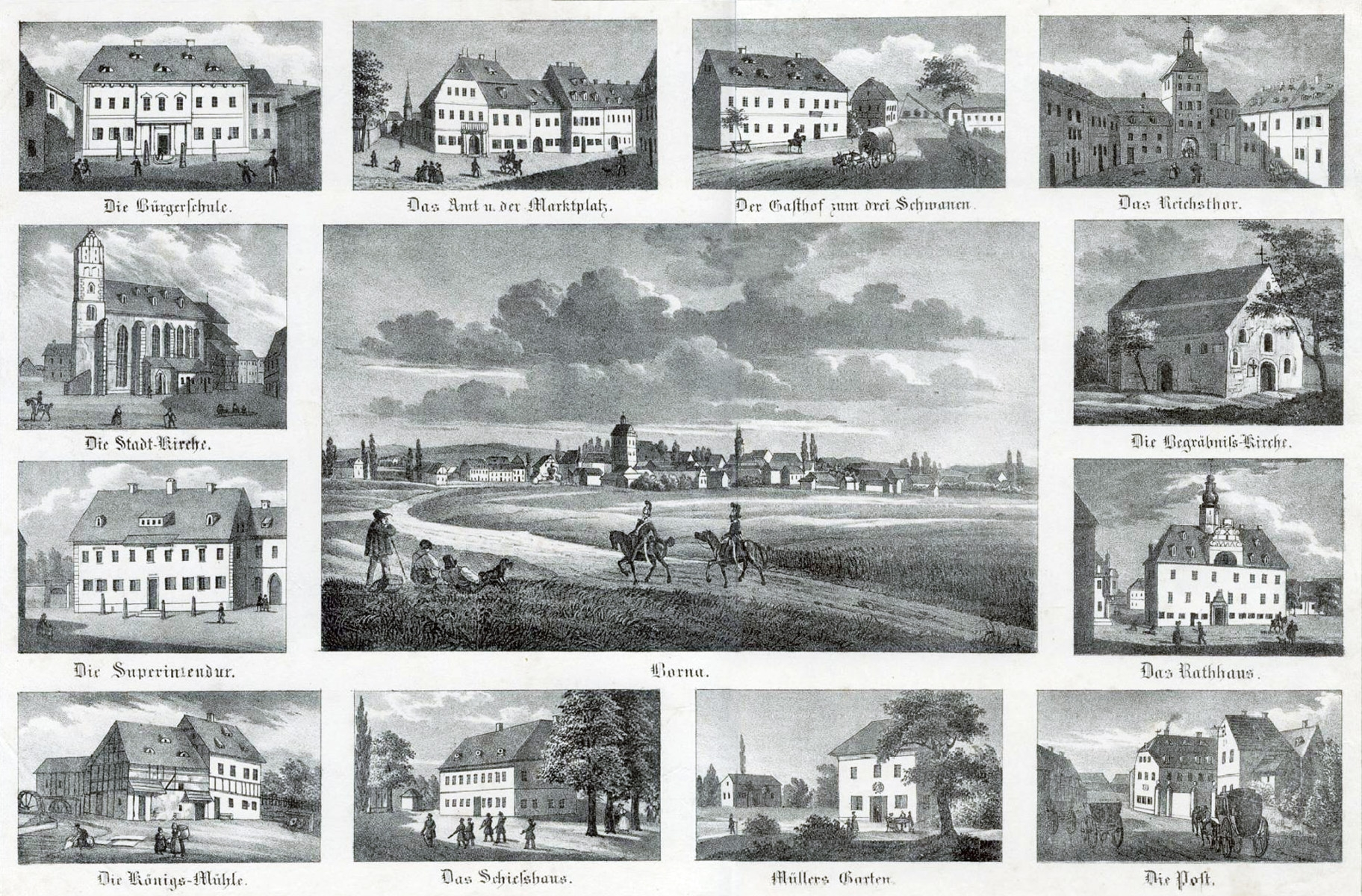
Borna and its buildings 1840

Since the early 19th century the landscape around Borna has been shaped by open-cast mining of brown coal (lignite) with an apex in the 1980s. For the last 20 years there have been huge efforts to revegetate this landscape e. g. by flooding opencast pits and creating new lakes as well as planting thousands of trees.

The industrialization of the town coincided with the start of lignite mining around 1800. The lignite industry was predominant in the region until recently.

=== Population ===
(December 31 each year)

Year	Inhabitants	Year	Inhabitants	Year	Inhabitants
1900	12,000				
1998	20,598	2005	22,428	2012	19,.424
1999	20,365	2006	22,561	2013	19,259
2000	20,010	2007	21,539	2014	19,381
2001	19,616	2008	21,211	2015	19,672
2002	19,240	2009	20,920	2016	19,319
2003	23,200	2010	20,680		
2004	22,850	2011	20,405		

=== Railway ===
On January 14, 1867, with the completion of the Borna-Neukieritzsch line, Borna joined the German railway network. From Neukieritszch the line connected with the Saxon-Bavarian railway line between Leipzig and Hof. This rail connection was financed by a partnership between private concerns and the town and was the only municipal railway in the Kingdom of Saxony. On April 8, 1872 the link was extended via Geithain to Chemnitz, creating the Neukieritzsch–Chemnitz railway.

In October 2007 the 14th century romanesque building of Emmaus Church in Heuersdorf (12 km (7.5 mi) from Borna) was cut from the ground and relocated in Martin Luther Square of Borna . The church's journey took a number of days.

== Main sights ==
- Kunigunden Church
- Emmaus Church on Luther square (moved from nearby Heuersdorf, which was resettled because of an open coal mine in 2008)
- Town hall
- Secondary school Gymnasium Am Breiten Teich

== Gallery ==
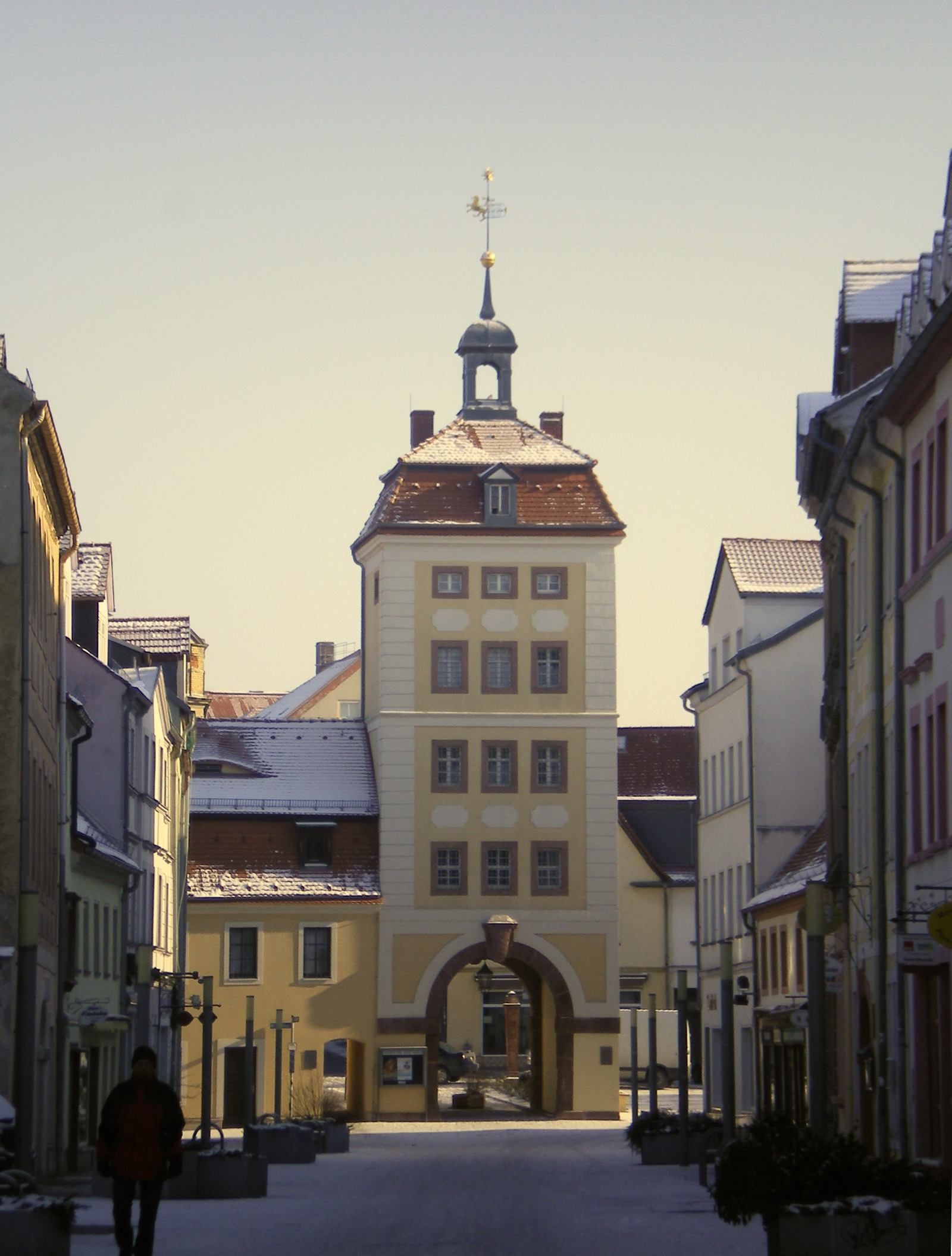
Reichstor - Imperial Gate

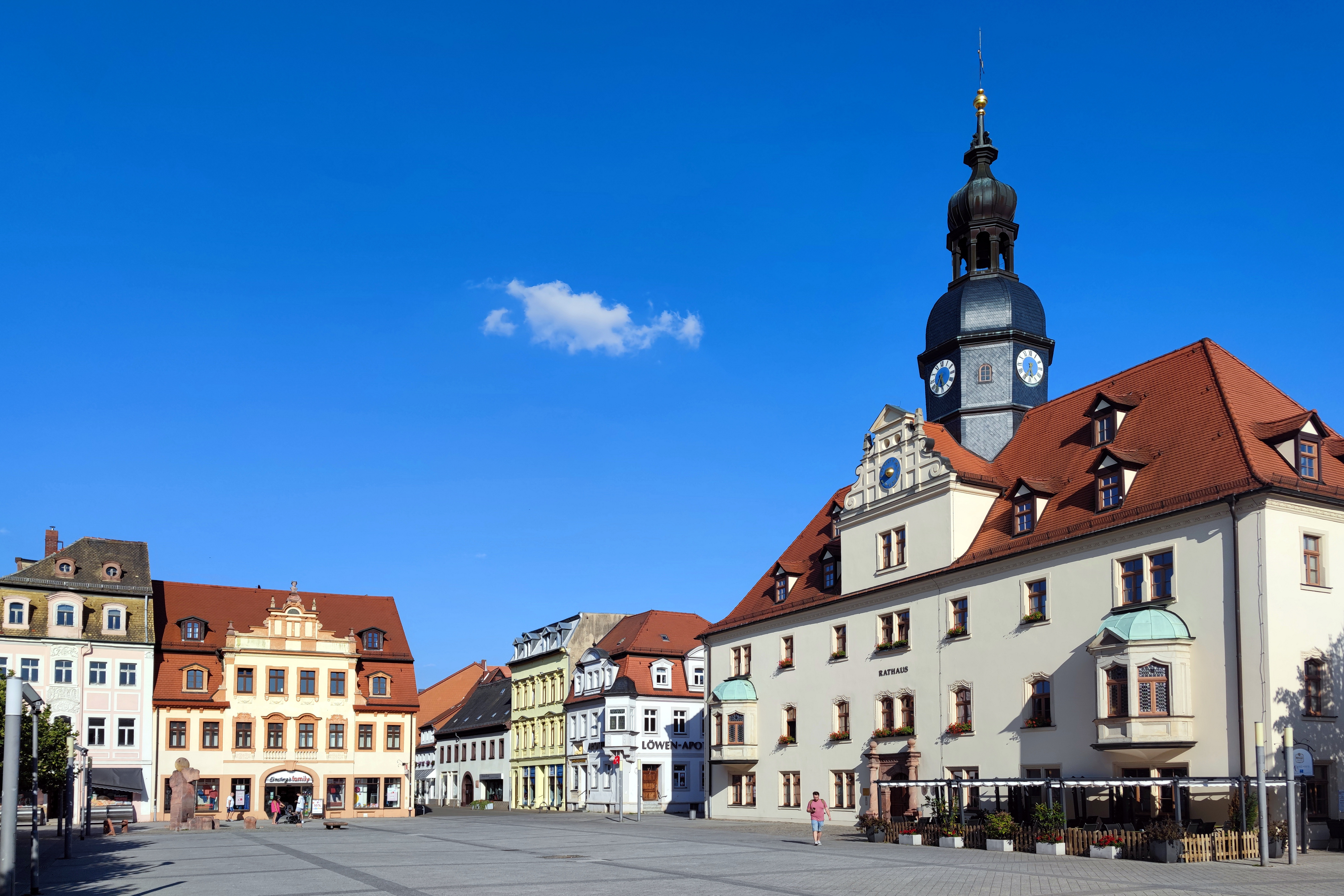
Borna Town Hall with Market Place

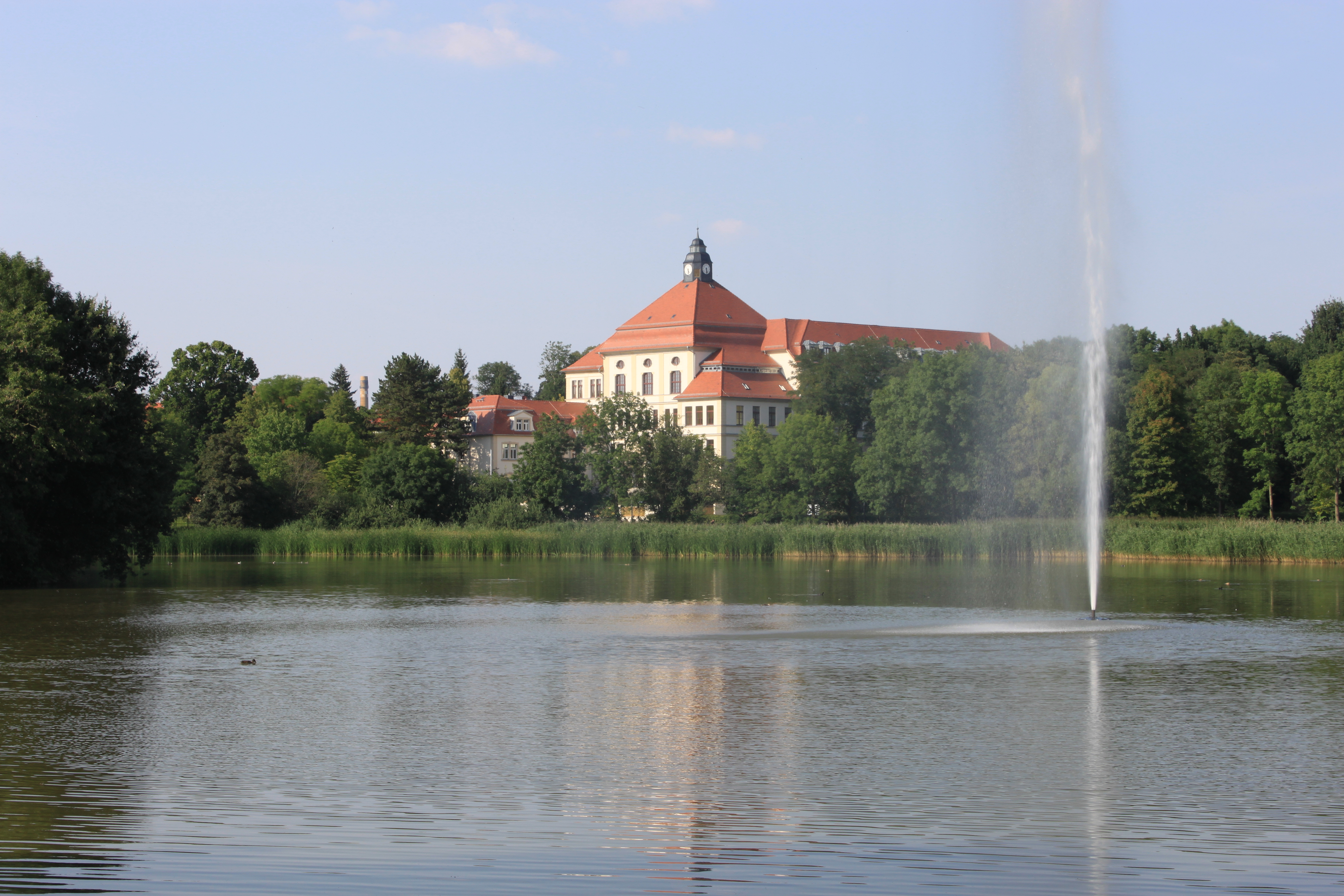
Borna secondary school

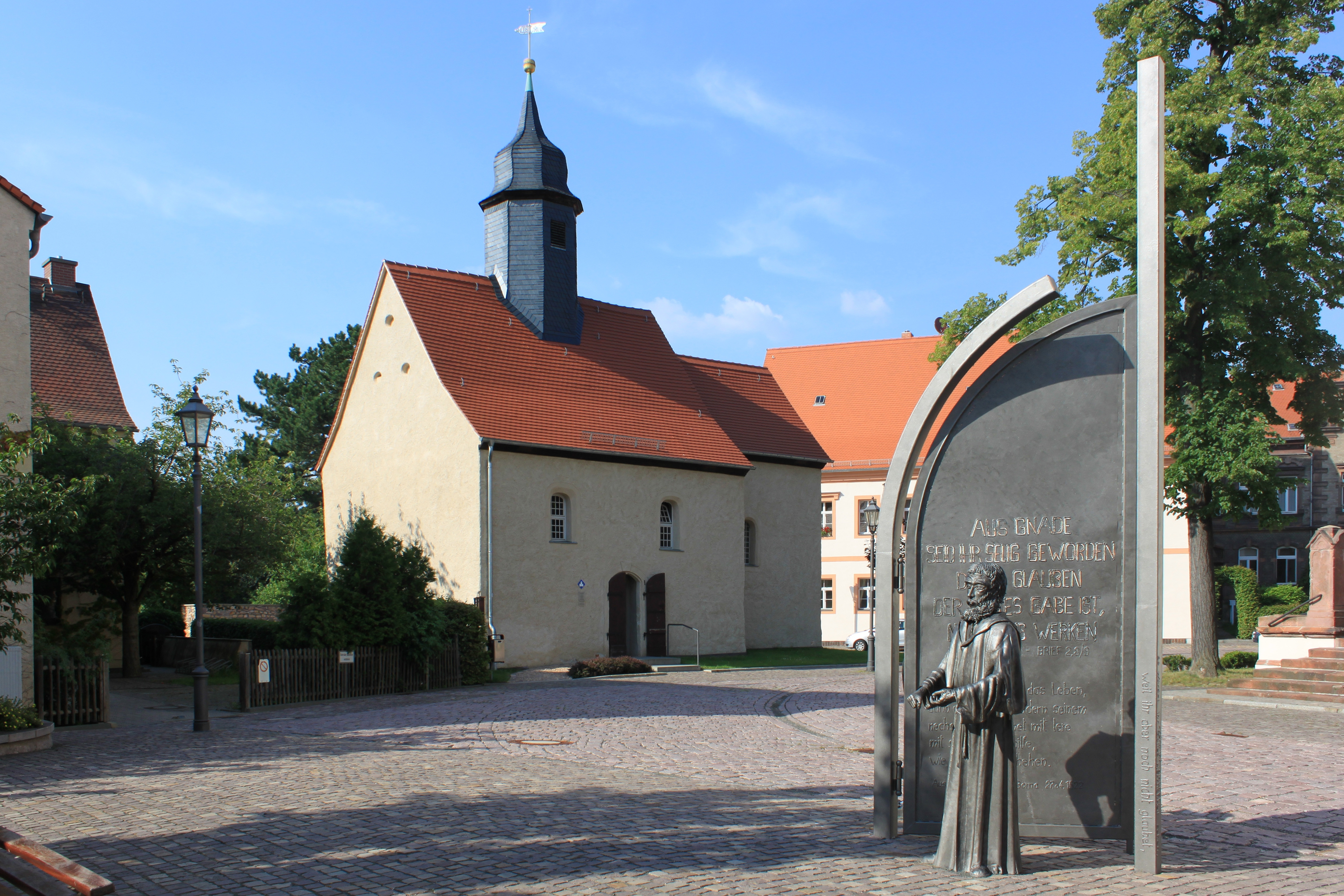
Emmaus Church at Martin Luther Square

== Notable citizens ==
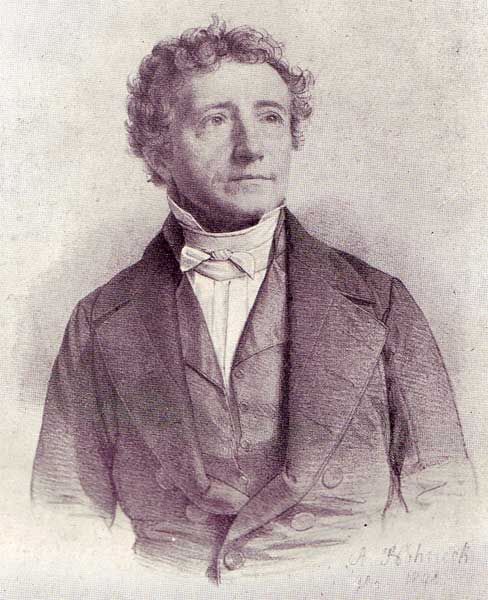
Karl Immanuel Nitzsch 1842

- Gustav Friedrich Dinter (1760–1831), theologian, educator
- Karl Immanuel Nitzsch (1767–1868), theologian
- Ludwig Otto (1850–1920), artist, was born at Borna
- Clemens Thieme (1861–1945), builder of the Volkerschlacht memorial in Leipzig
- Ludwig Külz (1875–1938), professor of tropical medicine
- Wilhelm Külz (1875–1948), politician (DDP, LDPD), MdR, Minister of the Interior

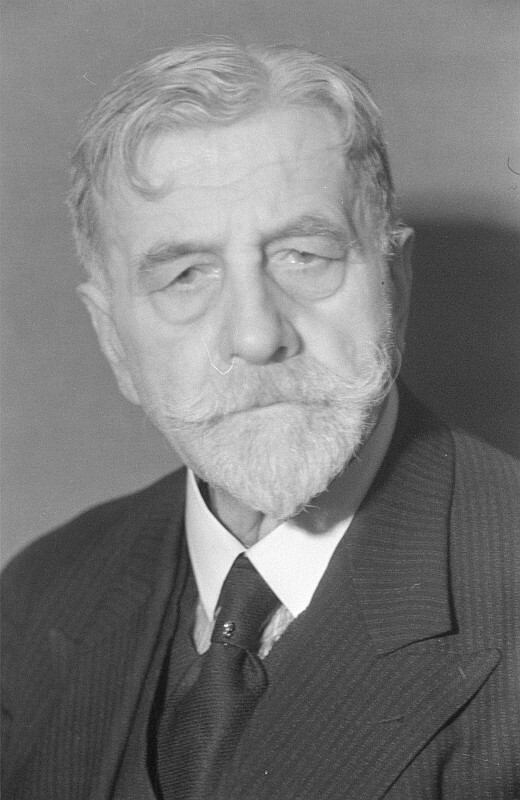
Wilhelm Külz 1946

- Karl Möbius (1876–1953), German sculptor
- Wolfgang Heyl (1921–2014), politician (CDU)
- Horst Pehnert (1932–2013), journalist and party official in the GDR
- Christine Kurzhals (1950–1998), politician (SPD)
- Thomas Munkelt (born 1952), athlete, hurdler
- Maic Malchow (born 1962), track cyclist
- Sven Lehmann (1965–2013), actor
- Torsten Jülich (born 1974), soccer player
- Thorsten Görke (born 1976), soccer player
- Steffen Radochla (born 1978), cyclist
- Oliver Herber (born 1981), soccer player
