= Margarethe Quidde =

German cellist, writer, music educator and pianist

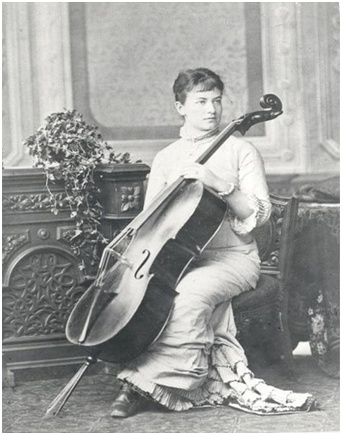
- Margarethe Quidde with her cello, from an undated photograph
- Born: Margarethe Jacobson; June 11, 1858; Königsberg
- Died: April 25, 1940 (aged 81); Munich
- Other name: Margarete Quidde
- Occupations: Cellist, pianist, writer, translator, critic

Margarethe Quidde (née Jacobson; 11 June 1858 – 25 April 1940) was a German cellist, writer, music educator, and pianist.

== Early life ==
Margarethe Jacobson was born in Königsberg in 1858, the daughter of Julius Jacobson (or Jacobsohn), an eye specialist, and Hermine Haller Jacobson, an opera singer. She studied piano, cello, voice, and composition as a young woman, in Prussia and later in Berlin with Woldemar Bargiel and Robert Hausmann. She pursued further training on the cello with Carlo Alfredo Piatti from 1880 to 1882, in Cadenabbia. She corresponded about her musical education with Joseph Joachim.

== Career ==
Margarethe Jacobson was a professional musician in Vienna and Munich as a young woman, before she married in 1882. Although she gave up her performing career, she continued as a music writer for the Munich Free Press, translator, and critic. She taught cello, and played cello and piano in small ensembles in Munich. She was active in the German peace movement before World War I, and involved with the Alliance for Radical Ethics; the Quiddes also founded an organization for animal welfare.

Her writings included Legislation and Science (1883), Heretics from the Bayreuth Sanctuary (1897), translations of Ouida, and a 1904 criticism of Isadora Duncan's controversial dances to Beethoven music: "She [Duncan] appears to have no feeling for the fact that musical works of art, born of pure artistic feeling as ends in themselves, are not to be degraded as means to other ends."

== Personal life ==
Margarethe Johnson married German historian and politician Ludwig Quidde in 1882. He won the Nobel Peace Prize in 1927. In 1933, Ludwig Quidde fled to Switzerland, in fear of Nazi persecution for his pacifism and other affiliations; Margarethe stayed in Munich to care for a sick sister. This was especially dangerous for her, because her father was Jewish. She died in Munich in 1940, aged 81 years, from heart failure.
