= Waldemar Koch =

German politician and economist (1880–1963)

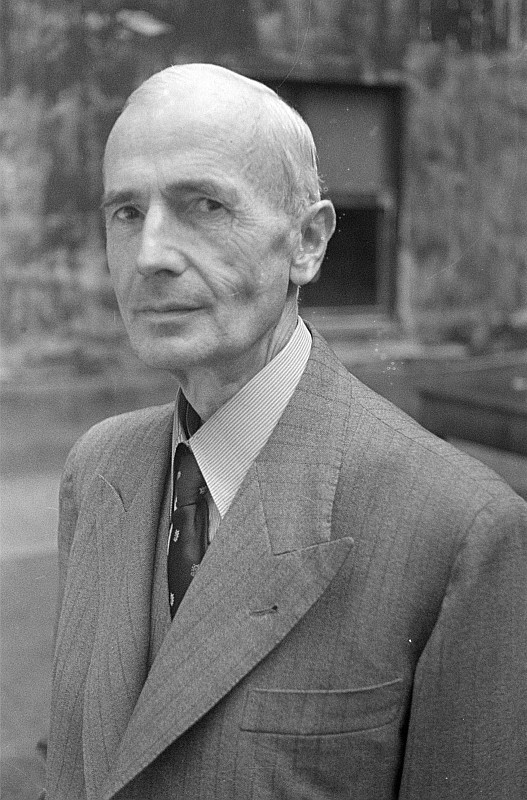
- Waldemar Koch (1945)
- Born: 25 September 1880; Bad Harzburg, Duchy of Brunswick, Germany
- Died: 15 May 1963 (aged 82); Berlin, Germany
- Occupation: Politician
- Political party: DDP; LDPD; FDP

Waldemar Koch (25 September 1880 – 15 May 1963) was a German liberal politician and economist.

He was born in Bad Harzburg, Duchy of Brunswick. Koch studied Economics, Philosophy and History at Berlin. He received a doctorate in 1907 for a dissertation titled "Consolidation in the German Electrical Industry" ("Konzentration in der dt. Elektroindustrie"). Between 1907 and 1910 he undertook an extensive study tour that included Russia, China and the United States.

He also worked for AEG from 1905 to 1907, returning to the company to head a London-based company for them from 1910 to 1914.

During World War I he served in the German army. In 1918 he joined the German Democratic Party (Deutsche Demokratische Partei). Between the wars he worked as an economist and professor at Technische Universität Berlin. He authored the 1932 book Die bol'ševistischen Gewerkschaften.

After World War II he co-founded the Liberal Democratic Party of Germany (LDPD) in the Soviet Occupied Zone (SBZ). In 1945 he was briefly the Chairman of the LDPD, but the Soviets forced him to resign after a few months. He opposed the land reform plans of the Soviet authorities and the Socialist Unity Party (SED). Koch was a member of the LDPD's executive committee until 1948.

In 1949 he went to West Germany (West Berlin) and again worked as an economics professor. From 1948 to 1956 Koch was a member of the liberal FDP (Free Democratic Party).

== See also ==
- Liberal Democratic Party of Germany
- Liberalism

Party political offices
Preceded by none	Chairman of the Liberal Democratic Party of Germany; 1945	Succeeded by Wilhelm Külz
