= German Democratic Party =

Former liberal political party in Germany

German Democratic Party Deutsche Demokratische Partei
- Founded: 20 November 1918; 107 years ago
- Dissolved: July 1930; 96 years ago
- Preceded by: Progressive People's Party
- Merged into: German State Party
- Youth wing: Young Democrats
- Paramilitary wing: Reichsbanner Schwarz-Rot-Gold (1924–1930)
- Ideology: Liberalism (German); Social liberalism; Republicanism
- Political position: Centre to centre-left
- International affiliation: Radical International
- Colours: Black Red Gold (republican colors)

The German Democratic Party (Deutsche Demokratische Partei, DDP) was a liberal political party in the Weimar Republic, considered centrist or centre-left. Along with the right-liberal German People's Party (Deutsche Volkspartei, DVP), it represented political liberalism in Germany between 1918 and 1933. It was formed in 1918 from the Progressive People's Party and the liberal wing of the National Liberal Party, both of which had been active in the German Empire.

After the formation of the first German state to be constituted along pluralist-democratic lines, the DDP took part as a member of varying coalitions in almost all Weimar Republic cabinets from 1919 to 1932. Before the Reichstag elections of 1930, it united with the Volksnationale Reichsvereinigung, which was part of the national liberal Young German Order (Jungdeutscher Orden). From that point on the party called itself the German State Party (Deutsche Staatspartei, DStP) and retained the name even after the Reich Association left the party. Because of the connection to the Reich Association, members of the left wing of the DDP broke away from the party and toward the end of the Republic founded the Radical Democratic Party, which was unsuccessful in parliament. Others joined the Social Democratic Party of Germany (SPD).

After the National Socialists took power, the German State Party was dissolved on 28 June 1933 as part of the process of Gleichschaltung (coordination) by means of which the Nazis established totalitarian control over German society.

== History ==
=== Background ===
The German Empire had a series of major liberal parties, including the National Liberal Party (NLP). The German Progress Party and Liberal Union merged into the German Free-minded Party. Friedrich Naumann's National-Social Association merged into the Free-minded Union in 1903. Theodor Barth and his supporters broke away into the Democratic Union in 1908, and maintained their independence until joining the DDP in 1918. The other liberal parties united into the left-liberal Progressive People's Party (FVP) in 1910. The FVP received 1.5 million votes in the 1912 election, the last one before the outbreak of World War I.

=== Founding and rise ===
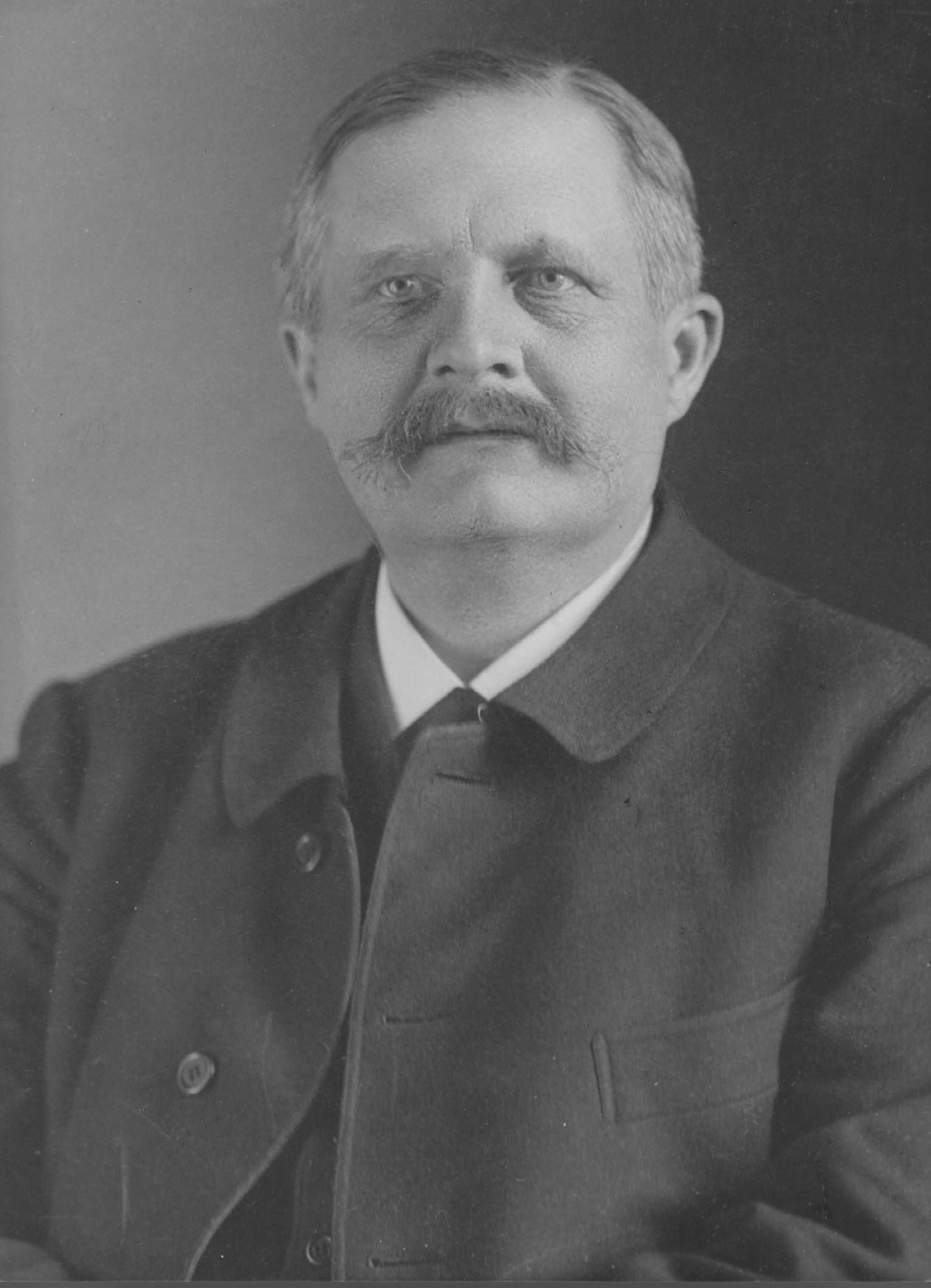
Friedrich Naumann c. 1911

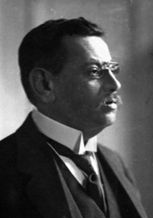
Hugo Preuß in 1919

A proposal to merge the NLP and FVP was made in the waning days of World War I, but faced opposition from the NLP's right wing and FVP's left wing.

Disheartened with the policies of the National Liberal Party and the Progressive People's Party and critical of a suggested merger of the two parties, a group including Theodor Vogelstein, Richard Witting, Richard Frankfurter, Hjalmar Schacht, and Kurt von Kleefeld, made plans to form a new political party. The group opposed the authoritarianism of Imperial Germany whilst supporting a democratic republic, and considered both of the established liberal parties to have been morally bankrupted by their support for the First World War and for their annexationist tendencies.

The group had little experience with political party organisation and so contacted various figures for support. Theodor Wolff, the editor-in-chief of the Berliner Tageblatt, responded with interest, and himself sought further support from academics and other journalists. At Wolff's insistence the new party was to be named the Democratic Party. One such journalist, Heinrich Gerland was tasked with finding support among existing Members of the Reichstag. At the same time Wolff and Paul Nathan wrote drafted the appeal for the founding of a new democratic republican party. On 16 November 1918, a week after the November Revolution, the appeal was published in the Berliner Tagblatt, signed by 60 people, among them Albert Einstein. An almost identical statement was published at the same time by the Vossische Zeitung (Voss's Newspaper).

While the appeal in the Berliner Tagblatt had hampered talks between the FVP and NLP, on November 18, representatives of the FVP and the NLP met with DDP figures to discuss forming a united liberal party. DDP figures demanded equal footing with the established liberal parties, and opposed any annexationist holding a senior position in a combined party, particularly Gustav Stresemann. Stresemann for his part was likewise hostile to working with many of the people already involved with the DDP, as well as holding reservations about FVP figures. Both of the established liberal parties left talks frustrated.

On 20 November, the German Democratic Party was officially established. The FVP responded by urging its supporters to back the DDP, and indeed the majority of the FVP as well as sections of the NLP's left-wing merged into the DDP. Two days later right-wing members of the NLP, including Gustav Stresemann, as well as a small contingent of right-wing FVP members formed the German People's Party (DVP).

The DDP raised millions of marks in the leadup to the 1919 election and had over one million members by January 1919. The party benefited from a large amount of funds from industrial, commercial, and financial figures, and received donations from organisations like the Hansabund. The party won 75 seats in the election and became the third-largest party in the Weimar National Assembly, but their support halved in the 1920 election and their seat total fell to 39.

The DDP was a member of the Scheidemann cabinet, but left in June 1919 in response to the Treaty of Versailles before returning to the coalition in October. Friedrich von Payer resigned as chair of the DDP's legislative caucus after voting in favor of the treaty. It was heavily involved with the creation of the Weimar Constitution. The document was drafted by Preuß, Max Weber influenced the section covering the presidency, and Erich Koch-Weser wrote the section covering referendums.

Naumann served as the first chair of the party until his death in 1919. His faction and ideological allies included Gertrud Bäumer, Anton Erkelenz, Wilhelm Heile, Theodor Heuss, Carl Wilhelm Petersen, and Gustav Stolper. This group held positions of high leadership within the party for the entirety of its history. Petersen served as chair until 1924, when he resigned after his election as mayor of Hamburg.

The Berliner Tageblatt, Frankfurter Zeitung, and Vossische Zeitung were among the leading newspapers that supported the party. Rudolf Oeser, an editor at FZ, became a cabinet member. Support for the DDP from these newspapers waned as the party went rightward.

The DDP initially voted against joining the First Wirth cabinet, but later joined it. It left the Wirth cabinet after the partition of Upper Silesia.

=== Decline ===
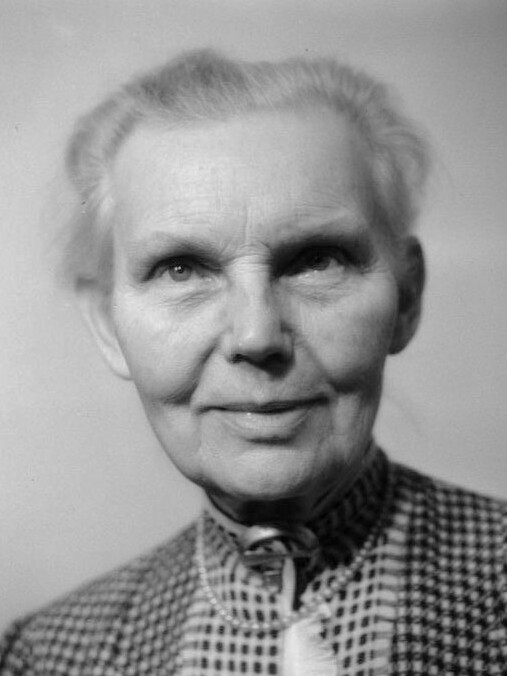
Marie-Elisabeth Lüders

20,000 people attended the first national convention of the Young Democratic Organization, but active membership declined to a few thousand members as the 1920s continued and 2,000 people attended the 1929 convention.

The party's membership fell from around 800,000 one year after its foundation to 117,000 by 1927. In spite its steadily dwindling size, the DDP played an important political role in the early years of the Republic. For one, its position between the SPD and the Centre Party helped stabilize the Weimar Coalition nationwide and especially in Prussia. Wilhelm Abegg, for example, the state secretary in the Prussian Ministry of the Interior, reorganized and modernized the Prussian police. In addition, members of the DDP formed an important reservoir of personnel for high positions in public administration. No other party was able to provide to a similar extent civil servants who both possessed the professional training and were loyal to the democratic system of the Weimar Republic, something that was not the case with the mostly monarchist and anti-democratic civil servants inherited from the Empire.

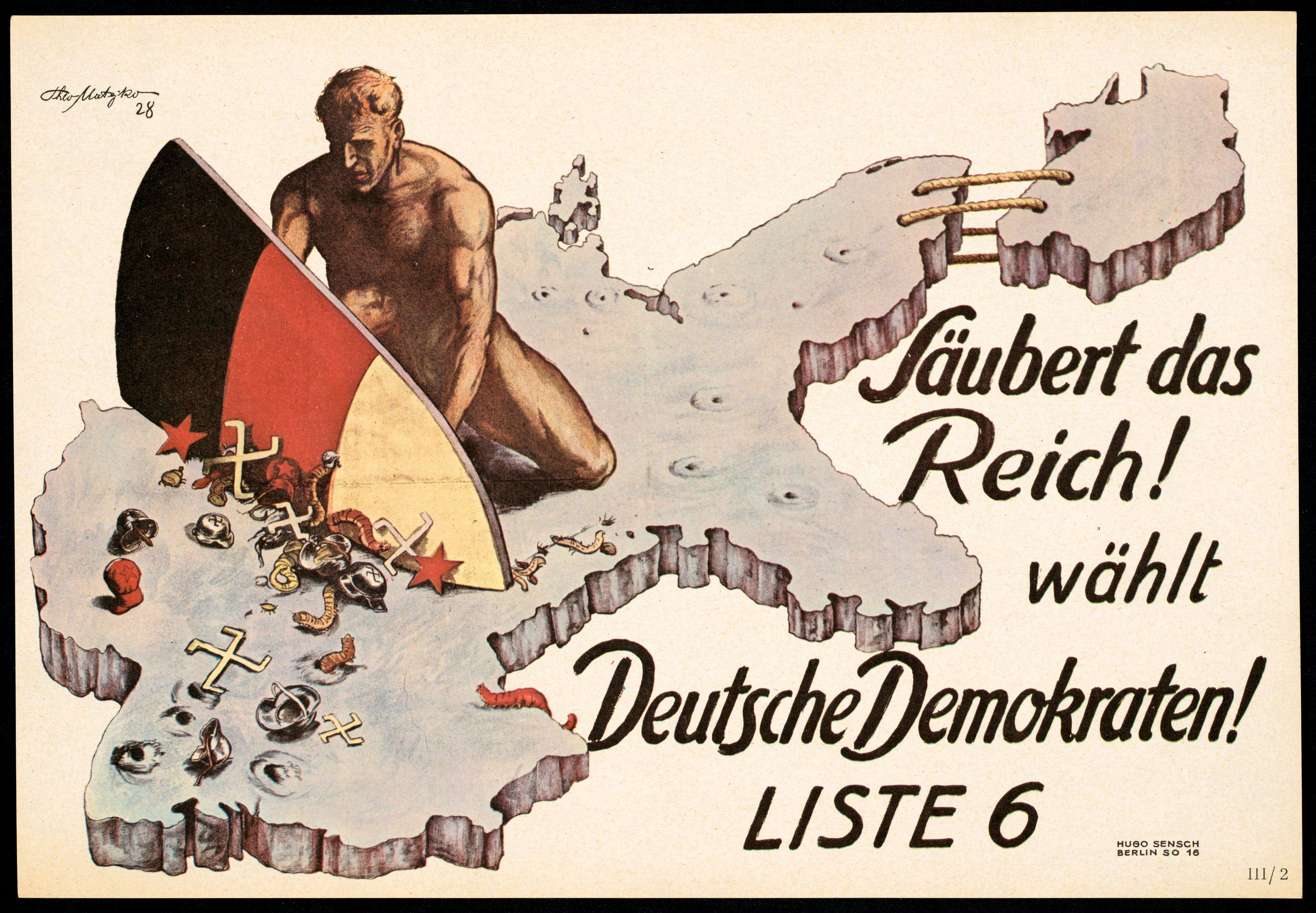
An election poster from the German Democratic Party (DDP) used during the 1928 German federal election, illustrated by Theo Matejko: "Clean up the Reich! Vote German Democrats!"

In 1920, the DDP had already lost votes, in large measure to the German People's Party, German National People's Party, and to parties focused on single issues. This was due to disagreements within the DDP over how to deal with the Versailles Peace Treaty, of which some deputies approved. The loss of votes was accompanied by a simultaneous loss of members, finances and journalistic support. Important newspapers such as the Vossische Zeitung and the Frankfurter Zeitung held views that were close to those of the DDP, but the party was never able to establish an important party paper of its own such as the SPD's Vorwärts or later the Nazis' Völkischer Beobachter. The prejudice that the DDP was the 'party of big capital' held credence among part of the public, a prejudice that was factually false and charged with anti-Semitism. In later years, the Nazi Party exploited this by defaming the DDP as 'the Jewish party'.

Another reason for the decline was their program of 'social capitalism' in which workers and owners mutually recognized "duty, right, performance and profit" and where solidarity was to prevail between employees, workers and owners. This visionary idea was out of touch with the reality of rising unemployment and economic difficulties under the pressure of the Treaty of Versailles.

=== Renaming to the German State Party ===
In July 1930, the DDP united with the People's National Reich Association (VNR) to form the German State Party, initially for the upcoming Reichstag elections. This brought fierce conflicts within the party, as the VNR was the political arm of Artur Mahraun's national liberal Young German Order. After the merger, many members of the left wing, including Ludwig Quidde and Hellmut von Gerlach, left the party and founded the Radical Democratic Party in 1930, which was largely unsuccessful politically. The Young German Order broke away from the DDP immediately after the Reichstag elections, but the DDP nevertheless formally reorganized itself the German State Party (DStP) on 8 November 1930.

The party received 1.3 million votes and 20 seats in the 1930 election. Its electoral performance continued to decline in the 1930s. Its seat total declined by sixteen in the July 1932 election, where it received 371,000 votes. Hermann Dietrich called for the party to be dissolved after these results. Its seat total fell to two after the November 1932 election. Hermann von Richthofen, Peter Reinhold, and others left the party after failing to convince its leadership to dissolve it. It gained three seats in the March 1933 election, but its share of the vote declined. The DStP obtained these five seats with the help of a combined list with the SPD.

The DStP deputies, as opposed to the SPD, voted for the Nazi-sponsored Enabling Act, which effectively disempowered the Reichstag. Their "yes" to the Enabling Act was justified by the deputy Reinhold Maier. The final sentence of his speech read: "In the interest of the people and the Fatherland and in the expectation of lawful developments, we will put aside our serious misgivings and agree to the Enabling Act."

The DStP deputies in the Landtag of Prussia were removed on the charge that they had worked with the SPD during the election, and they were banned from engaging in political activity in Prussia in June. Since the mandates of the DStP’s Reichstag deputies had been won by means of nominations from the Social Democratic Party, they expired in July 1933 based on a provision of the Gleichschaltung Law of 31 March 1933. The self-dissolution of the DStP, forced by the Nazis, took place on 28 June 1933. The law against the formation of new parties enacted on 14 July codified the existence of a single party in the Nazi state and any activity on behalf of other parties was made a punishable offense.

=== Resistance to National Socialism ===
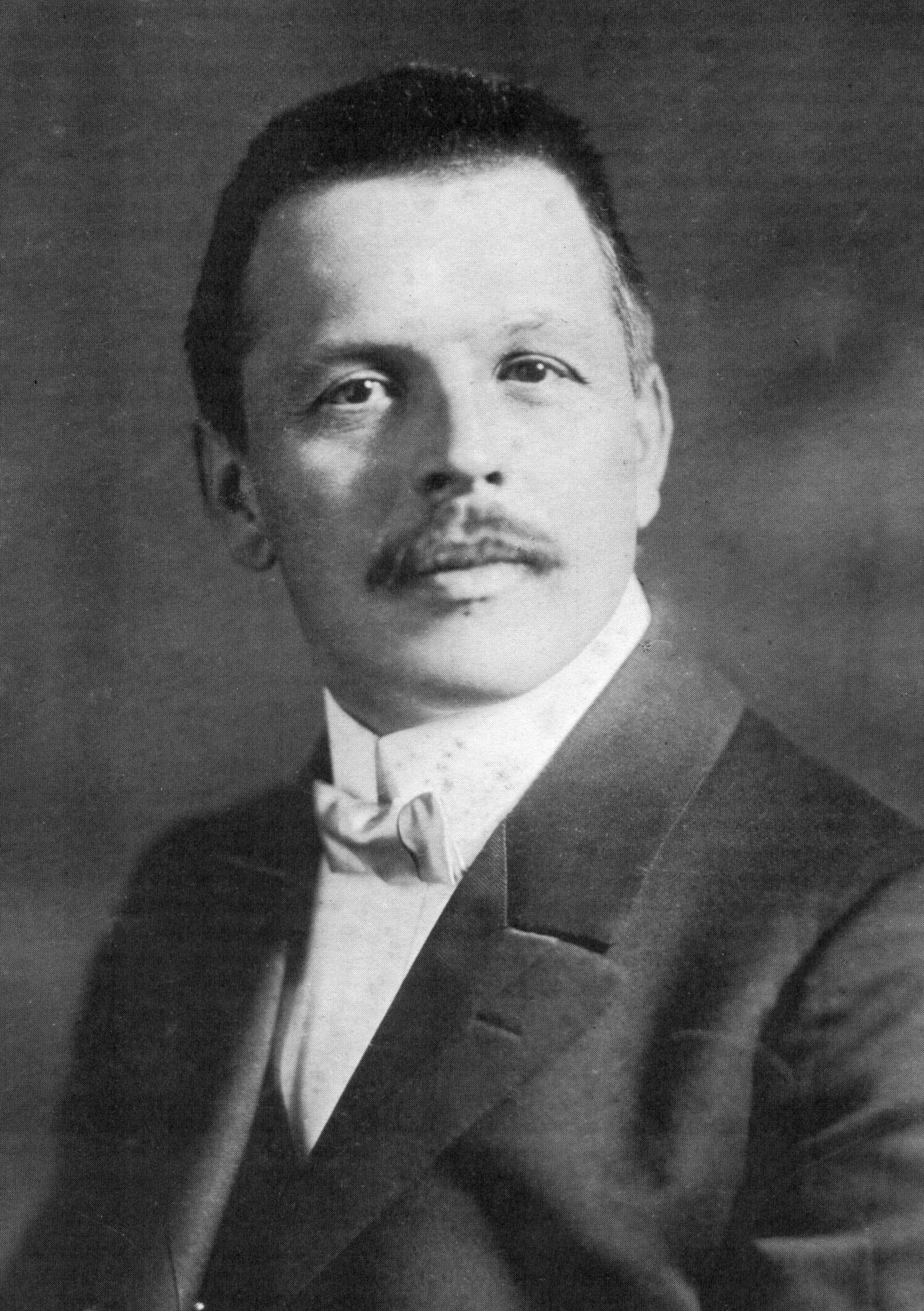
Otto Geßler

Individual members of the DStP participated in the resistance to National Socialism. The only left-liberal resistance group, the Robinsohn-Strassmann group, consisted mainly of former DDP/DStP members. A middle-class resistance circle with about sixty members was the Sperr Circle in Bavaria. It consisted of the diplomat Franz Sperr as well as the former Weimar Reich ministers and DDP members Otto Geßler and Eduard Hamm. Many former members of the DDP and Radical Democratic Party also found themselves forced into exile either because of their stance against the regime or their pacifist attitudes, among them Ludwig Quidde and Wilhelm Abegg. Others were murdered by the National Socialists, including Fritz Elsas.

== DDP politicians after World War II ==
After World War II, former members of the DDP were instrumental in founding both the West German Free Democratic Party (FDP) – for example Theodor Heuss, Thomas Dehler and Reinhold Maier – and the East German Liberal Democratic Party (LDPD) – including Wilhelm Külz, Eugen Schiffer and Waldemar Koch – while others such as Ernst Lemmer, Ferdinand Friedensburg and August Bach went to the Christian Democratic Union (CDU), or the Social Democratic Party, including Erich Lüth. Otto Nuschke became leader of the East German CDU.

The youth organization Young Democrats (Jungdemokraten), which had been close to the DDP, continued to exist until 2018.

== Political positions ==
The program of the DDP was social liberalism. Supporters and members of the party were recruited primarily from the Bildungsbürgertum. It was also supported by executives and civil servants, industrialists mainly from the chemical and electrical industries and liberal Jews. More Jews voted for the DDP than for any other party. It was therefore dubbed the "party of Jews and professors".

The DDP was divided between supporting a centralized or federal system. Weber and Preuß supported a centralized system and breaking up Prussia into multiple states. Otto Fischbeck, Conrad Haußmann, and Payer supported the continued existence of the Prussian state.

The party was divided over changing the flag. Democrats in the north supported maintaining the imperial flag while those in the south supported changing it. The party's deputies voted 43 to 14 against the new flag. Bernhard Dernburg, Fischbeck, Georg Gothein, Koch-Weser, Naumann, Petersen, and Schiffer opposed changing the flag while Anton Erkelenz, Haussmann, Nuschke, Payer, and Quidde supported changing it.

The Bavarian affiliate of the DDP, which the DVP merged into, supported anti-clericalism.

The party never accepted the eastern boundaries of Weimar Germany. It supported returning the Free City of Danzig to Germany and uniting Germany and Austria into one country. It initially supported the League of Nations, but this waned due to rulings that did not benefit Germany.

== Chairmen of the party ==
- Friedrich Naumann (1919)
- Carl Wilhelm Petersen (1919–1924)
- Erich Koch-Weser (1924–1930)
- Hermann Dietrich (oct. 1930–sep. 1932)
- 3 co-chairmen: Hermann Dietrich, Carl Wilhelm Petersen, Reinhold Maier (sep. 1932–1933)

== Election results ==
DDP federal election results
Election year	Votes	%	Seats	+/–
1919	5,641,825	18.6 (3rd)	75 / 423	New
1920	2,333,741	8.3 (6th)	39 / 459	▼36
May 1924	1,655,129	5.7 (7th)	28 / 472	▼11
December 1924	1,919,829	6.3 (6th)	32 / 493	▲4
1928	1,479,374	4.8 (6th)	25 / 491	▼7
1930	1,322,034	3.8 (8th)	20 / 577	▼5
July 1932	371,800	1.0 (8th)	4 / 608	▼16
November 1932	336,447	1.0 (9th)	2 / 584	▼2
1933	334,242	0.9 (9th)	5 / 647	▲3

Presidential elections
Election year	Candidate	1st round			2nd round			Result
Election year	Candidate	Votes	%	Rank	Votes	%	Rank	Result
1919	did not participate							
1925 (Note: In second round the DDP instead supported Wilhelm Marx)	Willy Hellpach	1,568,398	5.84	5th	—N/a			Lost

DDP Prussian Landtag results
Election	Votes %	Seats
1919	16.2%	65
1921	6.2 %	26
1924	5.9 %	27
1928	4.4 %	21
1932	1.5 %	2
1933	0.7 %	3

Party chairmen of the DDP and DStP

Year	Party	Chairman
1919	DDP	Friedrich Naumann
1919–1924	DDP	Carl Wilhelm Petersen
1924–1930	DDP	Erich Koch-Weser
1930–1933	DStP	Hermann Dietrich

== Membership and support base ==
40% of the attendees to the party conference in December 1919 had a doctorate. Three recipients of the Nobel Prize in Chemistry were members of the party.

The DDP was mostly supported by educators, journalists, professionals, property-owners. As well it received the most support of any party by Jewish Germans.

== Noted members of the DDP and DStP ==
- Gertrud Bäumer (1873–1954), women's rights activist
- Thomas Dehler (1897–1967), lawyer
- Bernhard Dernburg (1865–1937), banker
- Hermann Dietrich (1879–1954), Reich Minister of Agriculture and Finance, Vice Chancellor and party chairman
- Hellmut von Gerlach (1866–1935), publisher
- Otto Geßler (1875–1955), Reich Minister of Defense
- Adolf Grimme (1889–1963), cultural politician
- Willy Hellpach (1877–1955), psychologist
- Theodor Heuss (1884–1963), journalist and university lecturer
- Elly Heuss-Knapp (1881–1952), social reformer
- Harry Graf Kessler (1868–1937), art collector and diplomat
- Erich Koch-Weser (1875–1944), party chairman
- Wilhelm Külz (1875–1948), Reich Minister of the Interior and Lord Mayor of Dresden
- Helene Lange (1848–1930), women's rights activist
- Ernst Lemmer (1898–1970), trade union leader
- Marie-Elisabeth Lüders (1878–1966), women's rights activist
- Thomas Mann (1875–1955), writer
- Reinhold Maier (1889–1971), lawyer
- Friedrich Meinecke (1862–1954), historian
- Friedrich Naumann (1860–1919), party leader and publisher
- Otto Nuschke (1883–1957), journalist
- Friedrich von Payer (1847–1931), parliamentary group chairman
- Carl Wilhelm Petersen (1868–1933), party chairman
- Hugo Preuß (1860–1925), constitutional lawyer and Reich Minister of the Interior
- Ludwig Quidde (1858–1941), historian, publisher and pacifist
- Walther Rathenau (1867–1922), industrialist and Reich Foreign Minister
- Hjalmar Schacht (1877–1970), Reichsbank president
- Gerhart von Schulze-Gaevernitz (1864–1943), national economist
- Walther Schücking (1875–1935), pacifist and judge at the Permanent Court of International Justice
- Wilhelm Solf (1862–1936), diplomat
- Ernst Troeltsch (1865–1923), theologian
- Alfred Weber (1868–1958), national economist and sociologist
- Max Weber (1864–1920), sociologist and national economist
- Eberhard Wildermuth (1890–1952), director of the German Construction and Land Bank
- Theodor Wolff (1868–1943), journalist

== Pictures ==
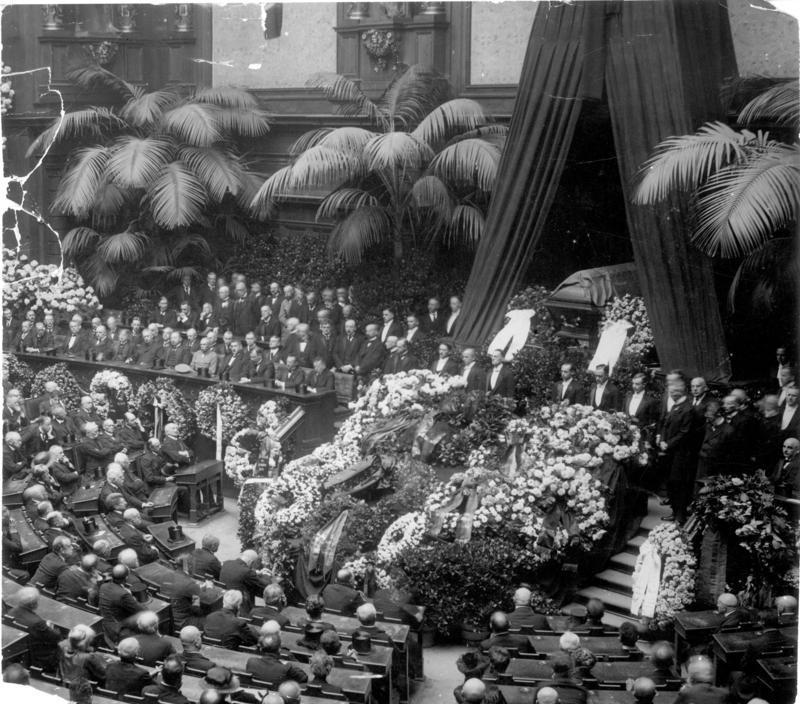
Funeral celebration for Walther Rathenau, the murdered DDP minister of foreign affairs, 1922

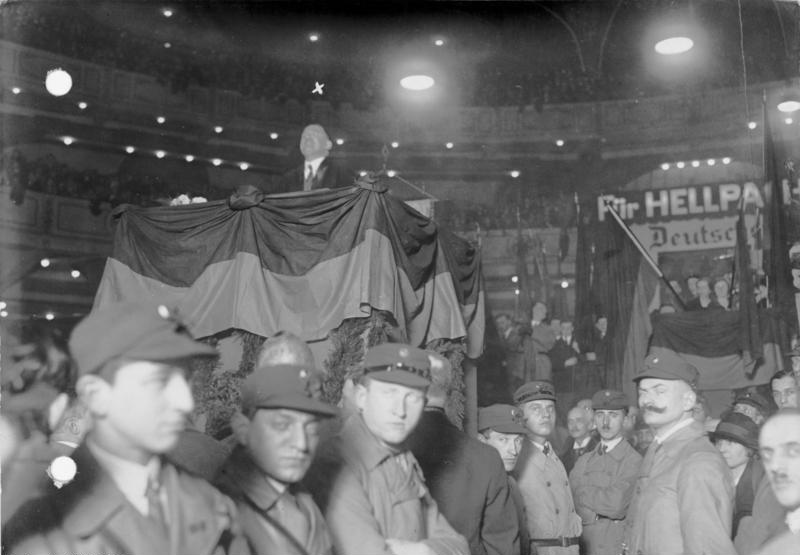
Psychologist Willy Hellpach, DDP candidate for Reich Presidency in 1925

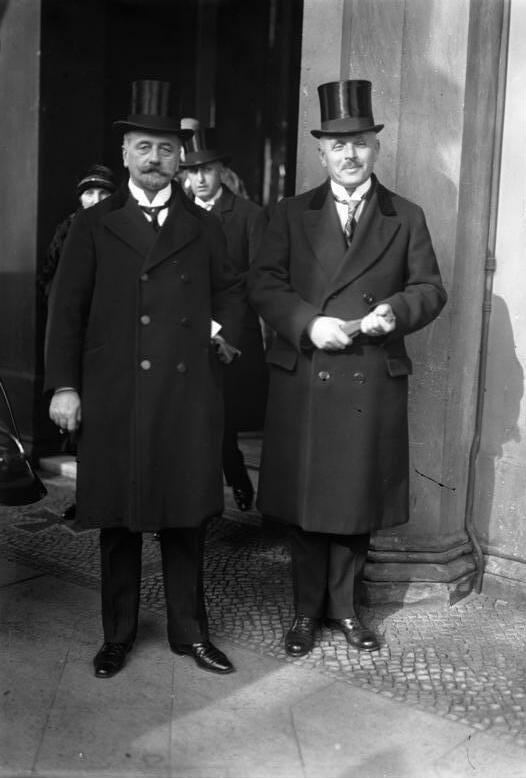
DDP Ministers Wilhelm Külz (left, Interior) and Otto Gessler (Defense), 1926

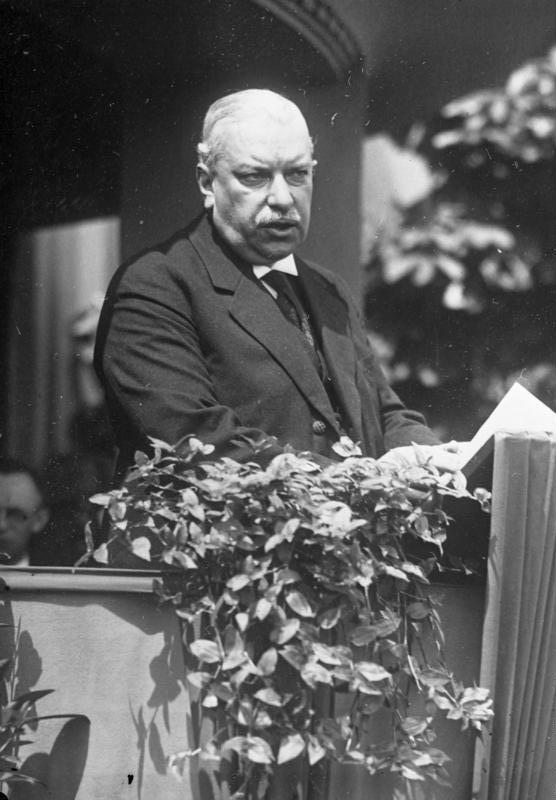
One of the political leaders of the party, Hermann Dietrich, 1926

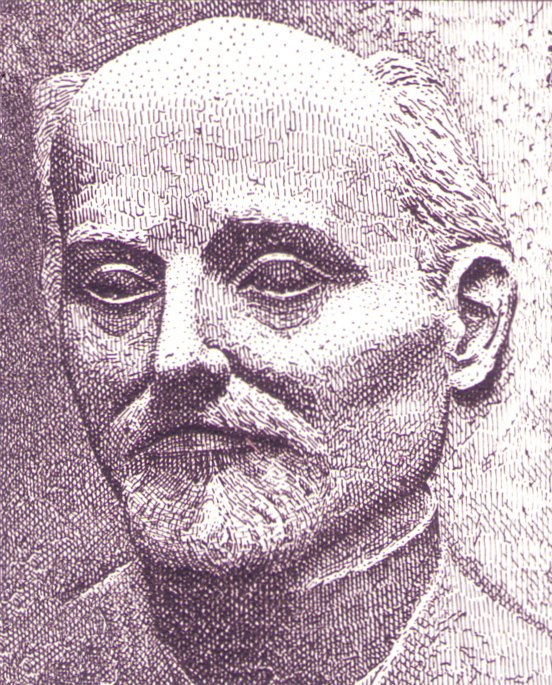
Ludwig Quidde, winner of the Nobel Peace Prize of 1927

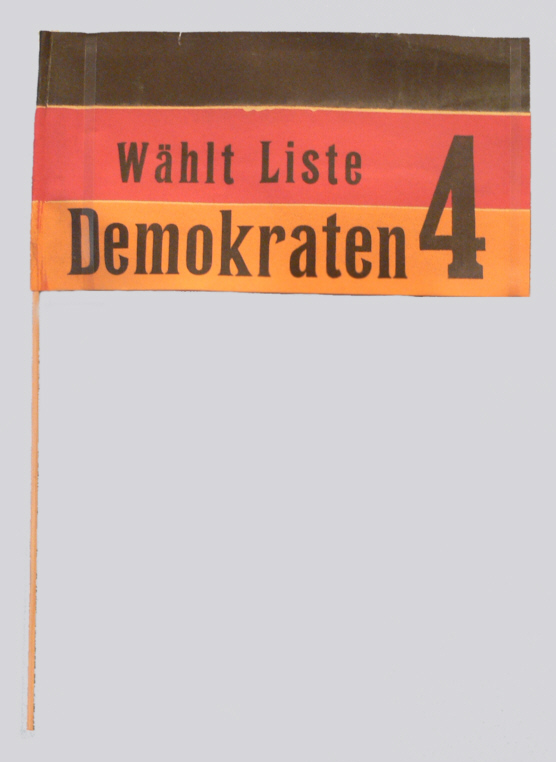
Paper flag from the DDP campaign for the Berlin City Council in 1929.

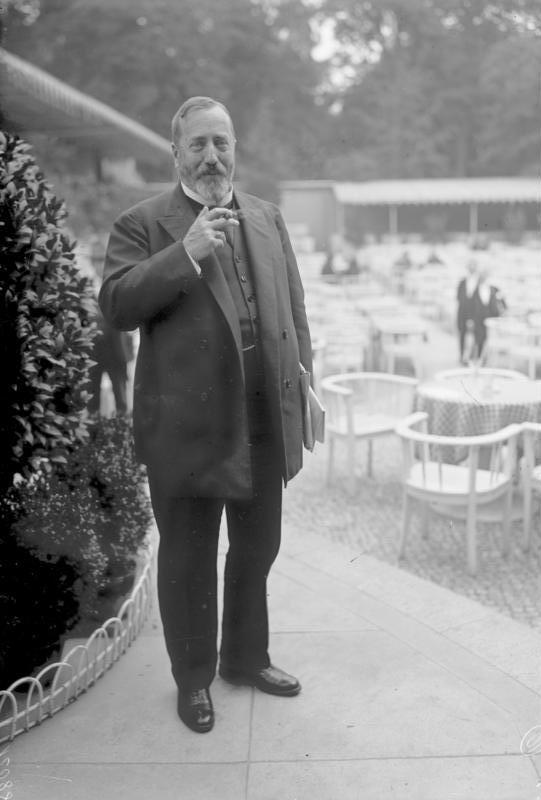
Former DDP minister Bernhard Dernburg in 1931

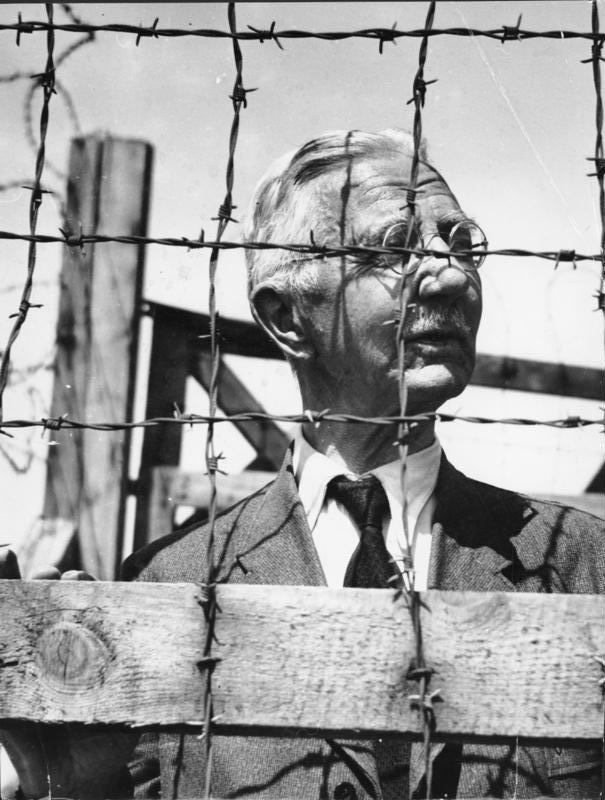
Allied prisoner Hjalmar Schacht in 1945

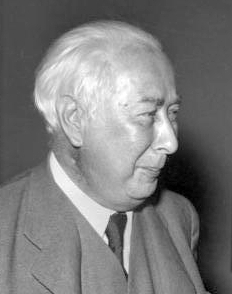
Federal President Theodor Heuss in 1953

== See also ==
- Liberalism in Germany
- Democratic Party of Germany
- Liberalism
- List of liberal parties
- National League of German Democratic Youth Clubs, youth wing of the party
- Weimar Republic

Preceded by Progressive People's Party	German Democratic Party; 1918–1930	Succeeded by German State Party

== Works cited ==
- Frye, Bruce (1985). Liberal Democrats in the Weimar Republic: The History of the German Democratic Party and the German State Party. Southern Illinois University Press. ISBN 0809312077.
- Chanady, Attila (1968). "The Dissolution of the German Democratic Party in 1930". The American Historical Review. 73 (5): 1433–1453. doi:10.2307/1851377.
- Jones, Larry Eugene (1988). German Liberalism and the Dissolution of the Weimar Party System, 1918–1933. Chapel Hill, North Carolina: The University of North Carolina Press.
