= Ludwig Quidde =

German politician and pacifist (1858–1941)

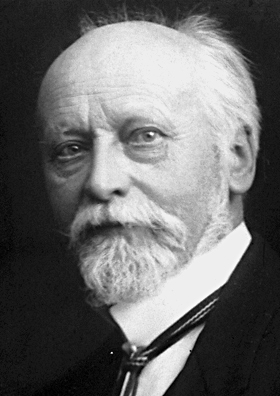
- Born: 23 March 1858; Free City of Bremen
- Died: 4 March 1941 (aged 82); Geneva, Switzerland
- Resting place: Munich, Germany
- Occupations: Politician, historian
- Political party: German People's Party, German Democratic Party, Radical Democratic Party

Ludwig Quidde (German pronunciation: [ˈluːtvɪç ˈkvɪdə]; 23 March 1858 – 4 March 1941) was a German politician and pacifist who is mainly remembered today for his acerbic criticism of German Emperor Wilhelm II. Quidde's long career spanned four different eras of German history: Otto von Bismarck (until 1890), the Hohenzollern Empire under Wilhelm II (1888–1918), the Weimar Republic (1918–1933); and Nazi Germany. In 1927, Quidde was awarded the Nobel Peace Prize.

== Early life and career ==
Born into a wealthy bourgeois merchant family, Quidde grew up in Bremen, read history and got involved in the activities of the German Peace Society (Deutsche Friedensgesellschaft). In his younger years, he had already opposed Bismarck's policies. In 1881 he received his PhD at the University of Göttingen.

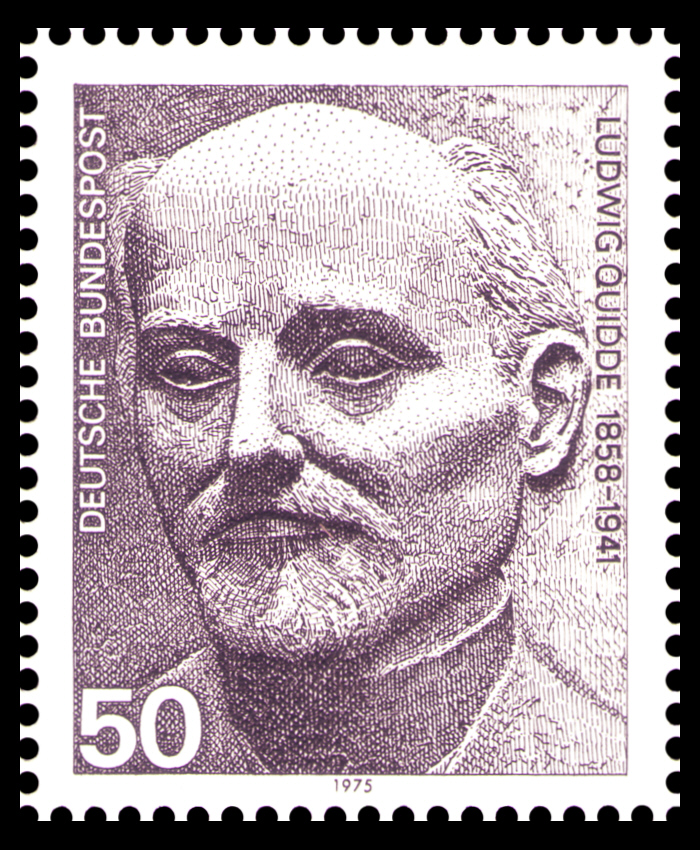
Ludwig Quidde

The fortune that Quidde inherited allowed him to devote himself entirely to politics. In 1893, he joined the German People's Party (DtVP), which was founded in 1868 and met his anti-militarist, anti-Prussian, democratic and pacifist expectations.

In 1894, Quidde published a 17-page pamphlet, Caligula. Eine Studie über römischen Caesarenwahnsinn (Caligula: A Study of Roman Imperial Insanity). Containing 79 footnotes, the short essay is exclusively about the Roman Empire of the 1st century AD. However, Quidde drew an implicit parallel between the Roman Emperor Caligula and Wilhelm II and de facto accused both rulers of megalomania. The author had insisted on publishing his pamphlet under his real name, which effectively ended his academic career as a historian when a periodical had a short review, which explained the parallels that otherwise might have gone unnoticed. After he had made a derogatory comment on a new medal in honour of Wilhelm I, German Emperor from 1871 to 1888, he was criminally convicted of lèse majesté and sentenced to three months in prison, which he served in Stadelheim Prison.

== Post-war life ==
After the end of the First World War, Quidde, like most other Germans, vehemently opposed the Treaty of Versailles but for different reasons from German militarists, who hated mainly the severe restrictions laid upon the German armed forces and the impending economic disaster that they stages would be caused by payment of the high reparations that the tretaty decreed. He and other German pacifists thought ahead and hoped that US President Woodrow Wilson would win the day by pointing out that such severe conditions would already sow the seeds of a new war:

A humiliated and torn German nation condemned to economic misery would be a constant danger to world peace, just as a protected German nation whose inalienable rights and subsistence are safeguarded would be a strong pillar of such world peace.

May those who are in power today think beyond this day and consider the future of mankind. Their responsibility is enormous. Today, an altogether new order can be created for the benefit of all peoples. Short-sighted misuse of that power can ruin everything. (Note: Ein gedemütigtes, zerrissenes und zu kümmerlichem wirtschaftlichen Dasein verdammtes deutsches Volk wäre ebenso eine stete Gefahr für den Weltfrieden, wie ein in seinen unveräußerlichen Rechten und Daseinsbedingungen geschütztes eine starke Stütze desselben sein würde. Mögen jene, die heute die Macht haben, über den nächsten Tag hinaus an die Zukunft der Menschheit denken. Eine ungeheure Verantwortung liegt auf ihnen. Etwas ganz Neues kann heute zum Segen aller Völker geschaffen werden. Kurzsichtiger Missbrauch der heutigen Macht kann alles verderben.)

— Quidde, et al., Announcement of the German Peace Society", 15 November 1918

When Adolf Hitler came to power in 1933, Quidde escaped to Switzerland and finally settled down in Geneva for the rest of his days. He remained an optimist throughout his life. Aged 76, he published his essay "Landfriede und Weltfriede" (1934) while militarism was again on the rise. He believed that modern technology might serve as a deterrent from war:

[It is] today's technological development which has turned modern war into a suicidal nightmare and which will put an end to war. This was already predicted by Kant, who expected "perpetual peace" to be established not due to the moral perfection of man but due to modern warfare, which would be so unbearable that mankind would see itself forced to guarantee everlasting peace. (Note: [...] die Entwicklung der Technik, die den modernen Krieg immer mehr zu einem selbstmörderischen Wahnsinn gemacht hat, dem Kriege ein Ende setzen wird. Das hat im Grunde genommen schon Kant vorausgesehen, der die Schaffung eines "ewigen Friedens" nicht etwa von einer Hebung der Moral erwartete, sondern vom Kriege, der so unerträglich werden würde, dass die Menschheit sich genötigt sehen würde, den Frieden zu sichern.)

Quidde died in his Swiss exile in 1941, aged 82.

== See also ==
- List of peace activists
- Margarethe Quidde
