= Max Pietschmann =

German painter

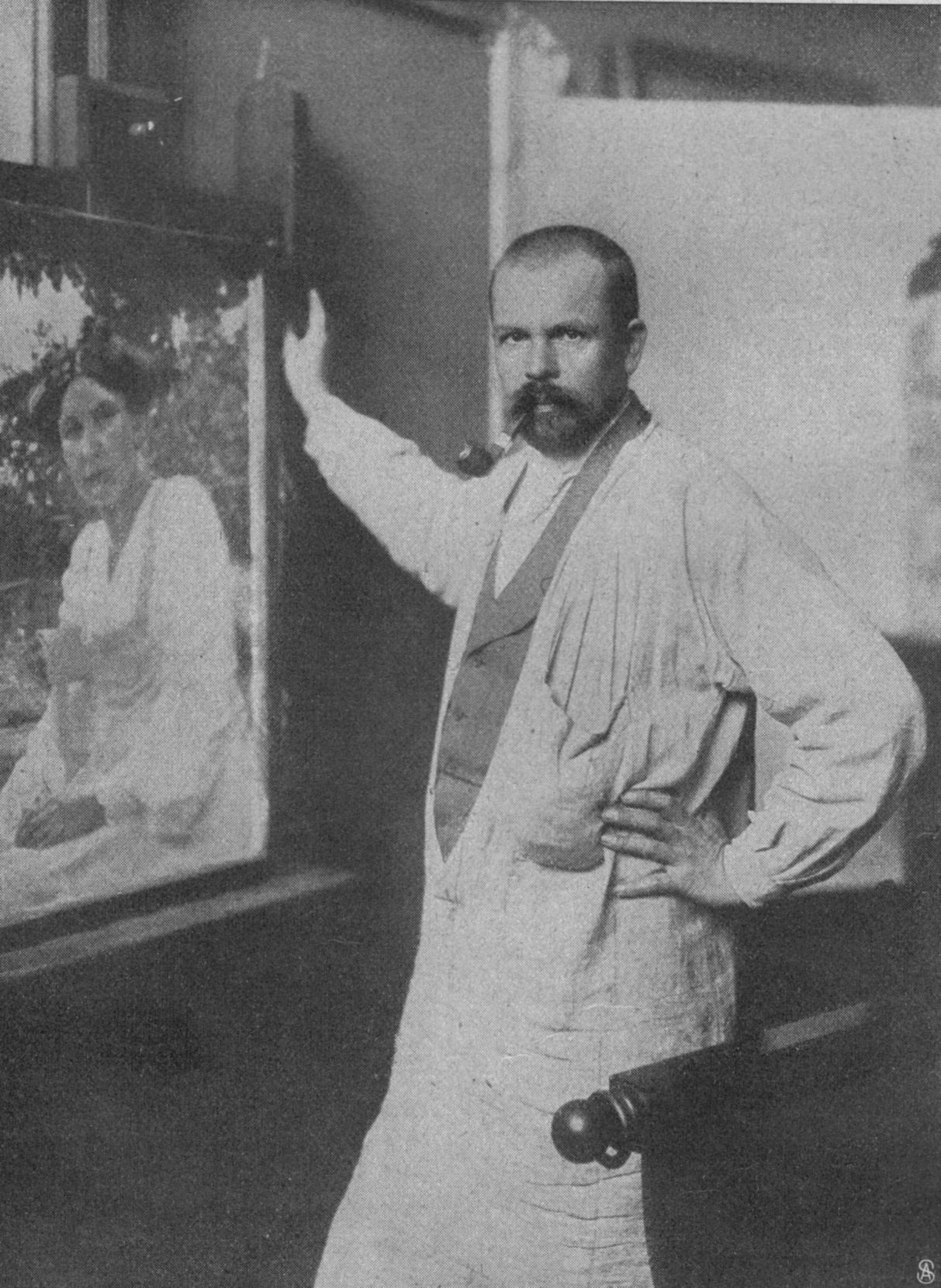
- Max Pietschmann in his studio, around 1905
- Born: Ernst Max Pietschmann; August 6, 1865; Dresden, Kingdom of Saxony
- Died: April 16, 1952 (86 years old); Dresden, East Germany
- Education: Dresden Academy of Fine Arts; Académie Julian
- Known for: Painting; Etching; Drawing
- Notable work: Polyphemus' Fish Catch (1892)
- Movement: Art Nouveau; Symbolism
- Awards: award at the Paris World's Fair 1900 title Professor in 1909

Ernst Max Pietschmann (August 6, 1865 – April 16, 1952) was a German Symbolist painter.

== Life ==
Max Pietschmann was born in Dresden and studied at the Dresden Academy of Fine Arts from 1883 to 1889. His teachers included Leon Pohle and Ferdinand Pauwels. Pietschmann belonged to the painters' colony in Goppeln near Bannewitz, which specialized in plein air painting. He spent two years in Italy with Hans Unger, after which he continued his studies at the Académie Julian in Paris, where he was mainly engaged in nude drawing. His 3.8-meter × 2.6-meter sea painting Polyphemus' Fish Catch was exhibited in Dresden in 1892, where Pietschmann was praised as a "bright painter of the latest Parisian school", as well as at the World's Columbian Exposition in Chicago in 1893. He received an award at the 1900 World's Fair in Paris. He then settled back in Dresden, owning an apartment and studio in the Artists' House in Loschwitz from 1898 to 1904, where he joined the Visual Artists' Association of Dresden, the first Dresden Secession movement at the turn of the century.

Pietschmann had a studio house built in the "Italian style" in Niederpoyritz, Dresden, and lived there from 1904 to 1952. In 1909 he was appointed professor at the Dresden Academy of Fine Arts. Pietschmann painted in the tradition of artists such as Max Klinger and Arnold Böcklin and had a similar repertoire, influenced neither by the Expressionist art movement that emerged around the time of World War I nor by the New Objectivity movement of the 1920s. With fellow Symbolists Oskar Zwintscher, Richard Müller, Georg Jahn, Hans Unger, and Sascha Schneider, Pietschmann formed a "‘phalanx of the strong’ that signified Dresden's art at the turn of the century."

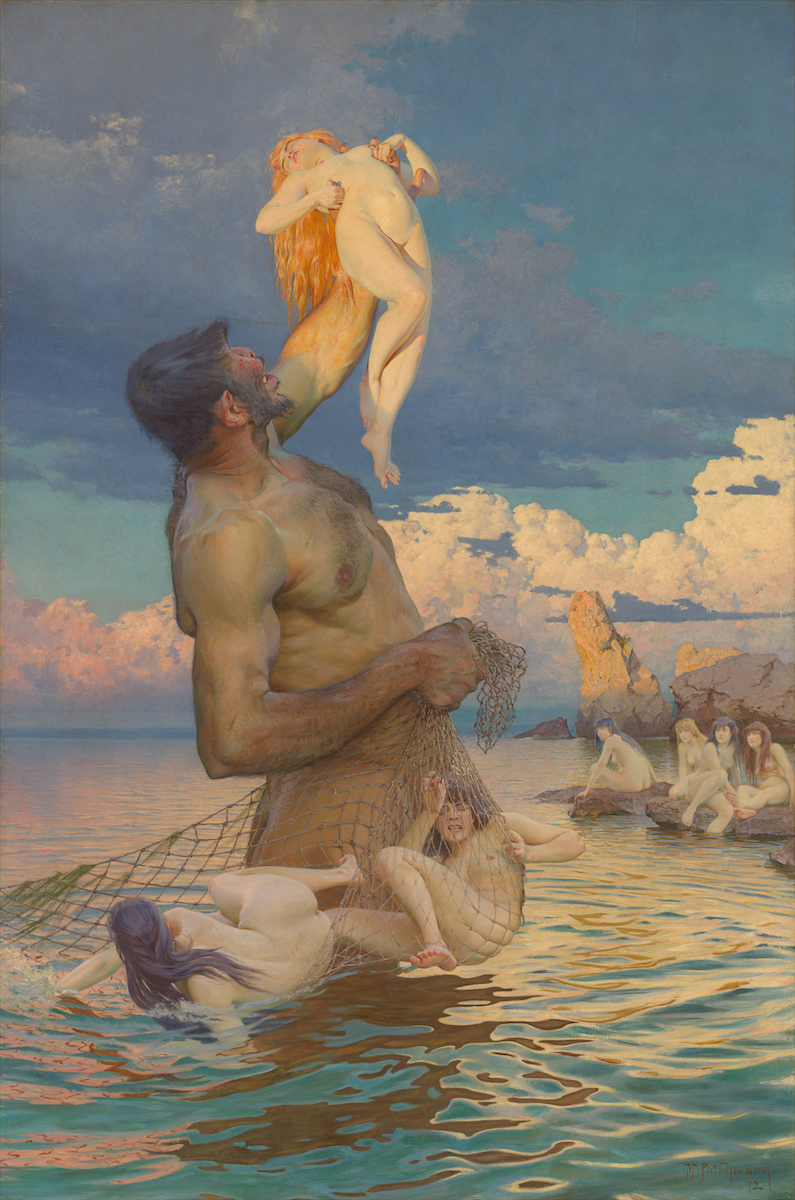
Polyphemus' Fish Catch (1892)

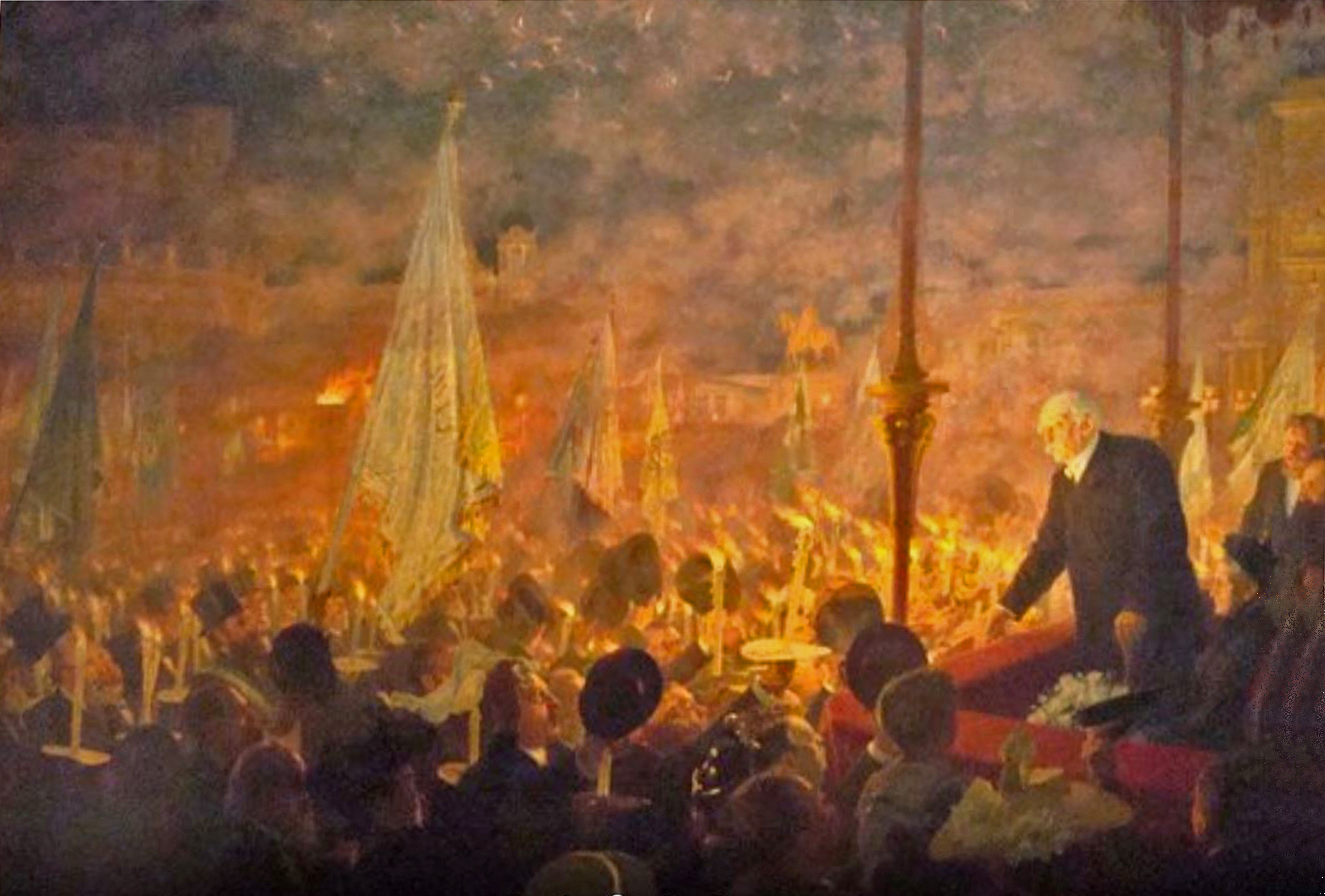
Prince Bismarck in Dresden on June 18, 1892 (1895)

Under the pseudonym "Fr. (Francois) Laubnitz" he painted pictures that were very popular as mural prints in the first half of the 20th century.

Pietschmann died in 1952 in Niederpoyritz and was buried in the Hosterwitz Cemetery in Dresden.

Large parts of Pietschmann's artistic and written estate are in the archives of the Dresden State Art Collections.

== Works (selected) ==
- Polyphemus' Fish Catch (panel painting, oil; 1892; awarded a medal at the 1893 Columbian World Exposition in Chicago)
- Prince Bismarck in Dresden on June 18, 1892 (panel painting, oil; 1895; in the holdings of the Dresden City Museum)
- Portrait of Adolf Rothermundt (panel painting, oil; 1897; in the holdings of the Dresden Gemäldegalerie Neue Meister)
- Bathers in the Forest Pond in the Evening (panel painting, oil; 1898; in the holdings of the Dresden Gemäldegalerie Neue Meister)

== Exhibitions (selected) ==
- 1893: World's Columbian Exposition, shown: Polyphemus' Fish Catch
- 1896: Berlin International Art Exhibition, shown: Adam and Eve. Moonrise. Portrait study.
- 1896: "Hand Drawings by German Artists", September 20 - October 31, 1896, Arnold Gallery, Dresden.
- 1899: German Art Exhibition Dresden
- 1900: 32nd Great Painting Exhibition of the Art Association in Bremen, Kunsthalle Bremen
- 1901: Great Berlin Art Exhibition
- 1903: 71st exhibition of the Hanover Art Association
- 1903: Great Berlin Art Exhibition
- 1903: Saxon Art Exhibition Dresden
- 1904: Great Art Exhibition Dresden, shown: The Bath. Adam and Eve.
- 1906: Great Berlin Art Exhibition
- 1908: Great Art Exhibition Dresden
- 1908: Munich Annual Exhibition, shown: Joseph and Mary. Spring Idyll. Mountain Water.
- 1910: Great Berlin Art Exhibition
- 1910: Exhibition of the Green-White Group at the Emil Richter Art Salon in Dresden, shown: Mountain Water. At the Water. From My Window.
- 1911: Hamburg Art Association, collective exhibition of the Dresden branch of the German Art Association
- 1912: "Places of Work", March 15 - mid-April 1912, Arnold Gallery, Dresden
- 1913: Eleventh International Art Exhibition in the Royal Glass Palace, Munich, showing: Seated Female Nude from Behind. Bathers. Model at Rest.
- 1914: First International Graphic Art Exhibition, Leipzig
- 1914: Biennale di Venezia
- 1914: Great Berlin Art Exhibition
- 1916: Exhibition of the Artists' Guild Berlin, August 3 - September 30, 1916, Nassau Art Association, Wiesbaden
- 1917: Franz Marc Memorial Exhibition, February 1 - April 1, 1917, Nassau Art Association, Wiesbaden
- 1925: "Inexpensive Graphics of the Graphic Cabinet", Arnold Gallery, Dresden
- 1933: "Portrait Exhibition of Dresden Artists, Graphic Cabinet", June 22 - July 25, 1933, Dresden Castle
- 1934: Saxon Art Exhibition Dresden
- 1996: Vineyard Church, Dresden-Pillnitz
- 1999/2000: Dresden Gemäldegalerie Neue Meister

== Bibliography ==
- Ruth Negendanck. Die Galerie Ernst Arnold (1893–1951). Kunsthandel und Zeitgeschichte. Weimar: Verlag und Datenbank für Geisteswissenschaften, 1998. ISBN 3-932124-37-5.
- "Pietschmann, Max (Ernst M.)". In: Hans Vollmer (ed.), Allgemeines Lexikon der Bildenden Künstler von der Antike bis zur Gegenwart. Begründet von Ulrich Thieme und Felix Becker, vol. 27: Piermaria–Ramsdell. Leipzig: E. A. Seemann, 1933, p. 30.
