= Osmar Schindler =

German painter

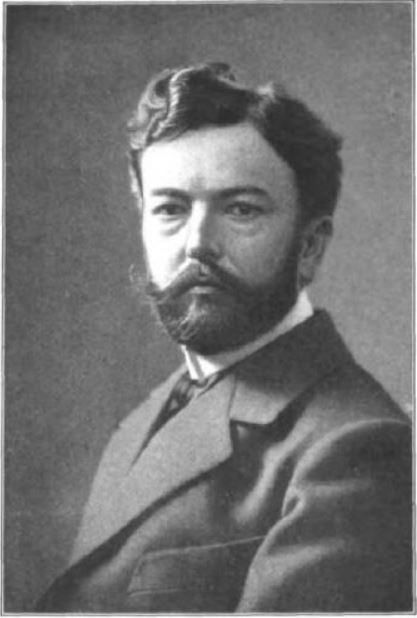
- Born: Osmar Schindler; December 22, 1867; Burkhardtsdorf, Kingdom of Saxony, German Empire.
- Died: June 19, 1927 (aged 59); Dresden, Germany
- Education: Dresden Academy of Fine Arts
- Known for: Painting

Osmar Schindler (December 22, 1867 – June 19, 1927) was a German painter belonging to the Dresden Academy school of artists. His works were considered a mixture of impressionism and Art Nouveau.

== Life ==
Osmar Schindler was born on December 22, 1867, in the village of Burkhardtsdorf, but grew up in the small town of Bischofswerda (both part of the German Empire), 33 km east of Dresden. He lost his father at an early age, and so with the support of his uncle, Schindler attended the Dresden Art Academy where he was taught by Ferdinand Pauwels and Leon Pohle with attending students including Sascha Schneider, Hans Unger and Richard Müller.

By 1895 Schindler had travelled to Belgium, the Netherlands, France, and Italy. In 1900 he was appointed professor of the Dresden Academy of Fine Arts. He led the Modellierklasse and counted George Grosz, Karl Hanusch, Bernhard Kretzschmar and Paul Wilhelm as his students as well as discovering Hanns Georgi.

He died on June 19, 1927, and was buried at Loschwitz Cemetery.

== Works ==
His works include landscapes, historical and figurative scenes as well as contributions to the interior décor of various buildings. For example, his vestry painting Christ, the Light of the World (1927) can be found in the Church of Christ in his home of Bischofswerda. There is also a 1905 painting of a monumental altarpiece depicting the crucifixion of Christ at Christ Church (designed by Woldemar Kandler) in Dresden Klotzsche. His most recognizable works are Im Kumtlampenschein (1901) and David and Goliath (1888), as well as the portraits of the German engineer Christian Otto Mohr and his colleague at the Dresden Academy of Fine Arts, Herman Prell.

Schindler was also involved in the Internationale Kunst Ausstellung in 1897. His work is generally considered influenced by impressionism, although his work displayed at the Staatliche Kunstsammlungen Dresden (SKD), his work for the Dresden exhibition in 1897 (Ausstellung), including his work within the various the churches, leans toward Art Nouveau.

Schindler's work The Mocking of Christ hanging in the church at Fischerhude has sparked controversy regarding its purported anti-Semitic depiction of the Sanhedrin. Several of his best-known and most reproduced paintings--Muscle Play (1907) and Germanic Warrior with Roman Helmet (1902), in particular—have been noted for their lush homoeroticism.
