= Georg Jahn =

German painter and graphic artist (1869–1940)

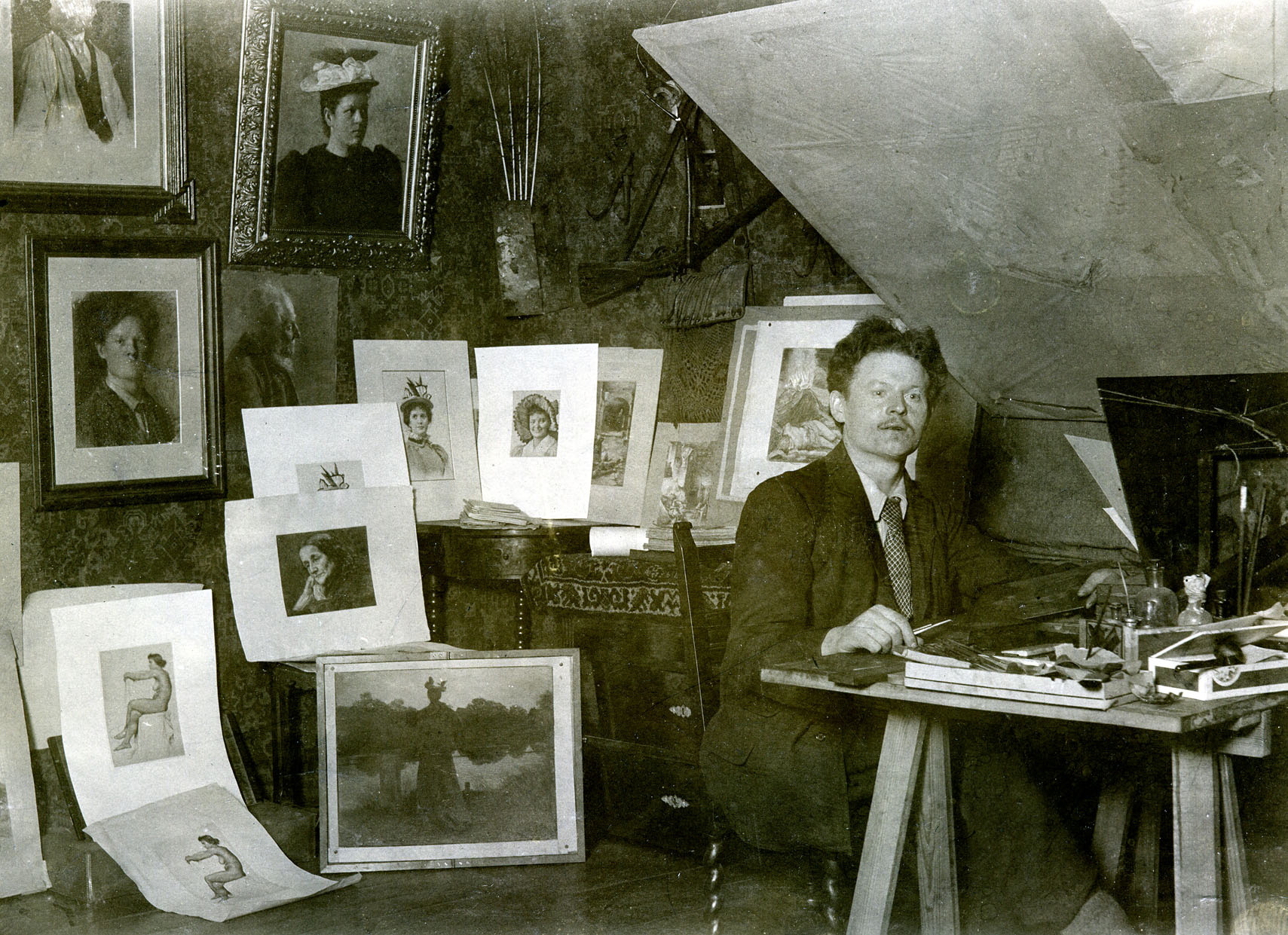
Georg Jahn in his studio (c.1899)

Georg Jahn (5 May 1869, Meißen - 18 November 1940, Loschwitz) was a German painter and graphic artist; known primarily for his etchings.

== Life and work ==
He grew up in a family that was closely associated with the Meißen Porcelain Manufactory. His grandfather, Christian Gottlieb Jahn, was a Supervisor there at the turn of the 19th century. His father, Karl August Moritz Jahn, was a "bossier" (someone who assembles single porcelain items from separate parts), while his older brothers, Ernst and Robert, were porcelain painters.

At the age of fourteen, he followed them into that profession, During his years at the manufactory (1883-1888), his talents were recognized and he was awarded a scholarship to attend the Dresden Academy of Fine Arts. There, he studied with the portrait painter, Leon Pohle. He left the Academy in 1890; completing his studies at the Grand-Ducal Saxon Art School, Weimar, with Professor Max Thedy, a noted portrait and interior painter. For several years, he worked as an itinerant illustrator and portraitist in Berlin, Leipzig, and Munich. In 1897, he settled in Loschwitz, a suburb of Dresden.

In the meantime, he had developed an interest in etching, and took lessons from his friend, Max Pietschmann. He created his first large work, "Female Nude", shortly after arriving in Loschwitz. In 1899, he received an award for his etchings at the Deutsche Kunstausstellung in Dresden. That same year, he married Johanne Goltzsche. For their first few years, they lived in an apartment studio at the Künstlerhaus Dresden-Loschwitz. Although he initially etched a variety of subjects, he soon focused on human figures.

In 1904 he became a member of the Sächsischer Kunstverein, and served on their Board from 1918-21. He was awarded the 1914 "Saxon State Medal". In 1929, on the occasion of his 60th birthday, the Kunstverein held a major showing of his works. In the late 1930s, his etchings were represented in Munich at the Große Deutsche Kunstausstellung; a display of works approved by the Nazi regime. His last exhibit was shortly before his death, at the Dresden Künstlerbund.

He died at his home in Loschwitz, and was interred in Meißen at the Saint Wolfgang Cemetery. His gravesite is modest, but has been preserved. A major retrospective of his works was given by the Kunstverein in 2006. Many of his etchings may be seen at the Kupferstichkabinett and the Städtische Galerie in Dresden.

== Selected works ==
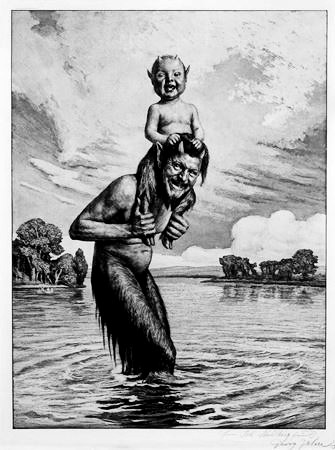
A Satyr and His Son

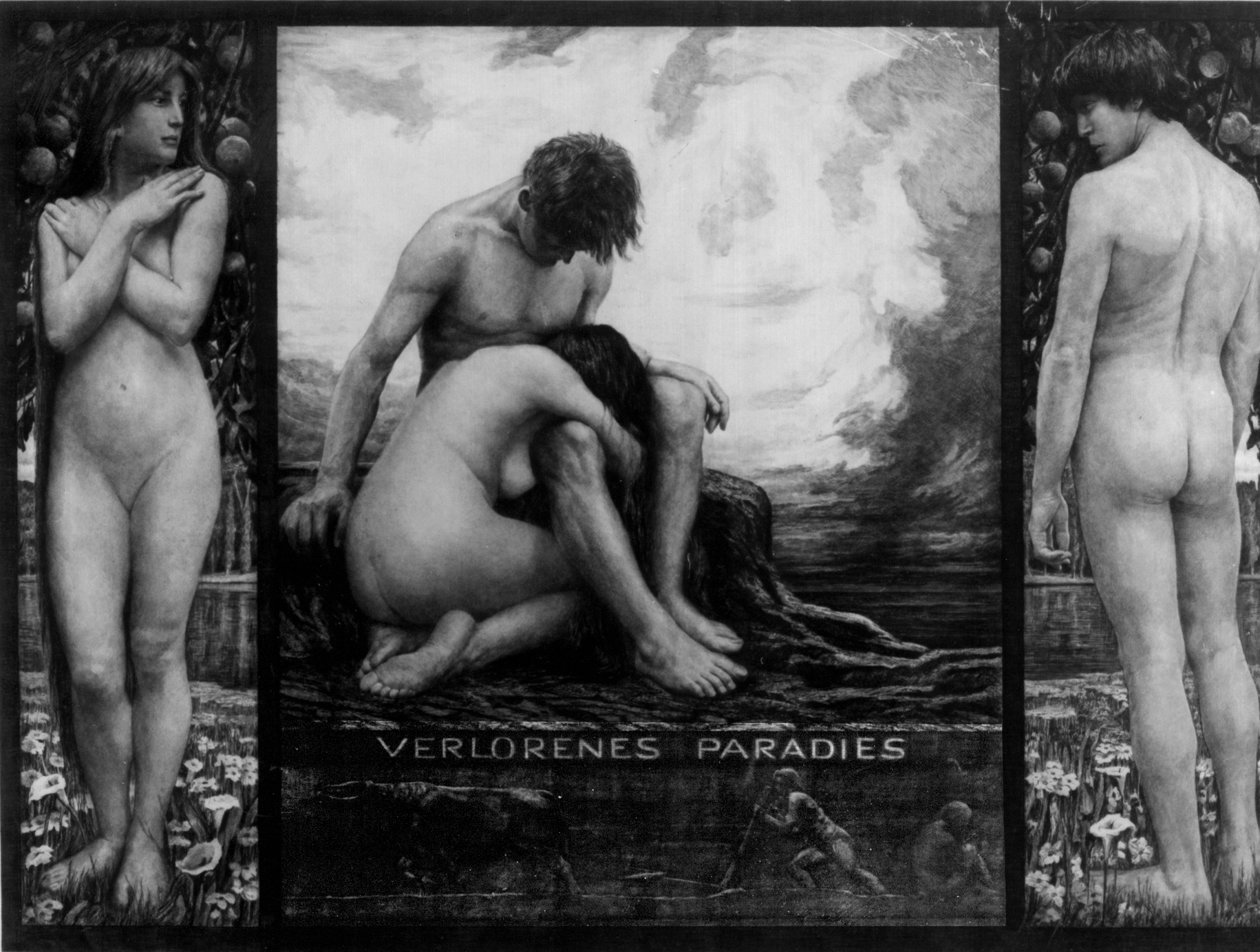
Paradise Lost

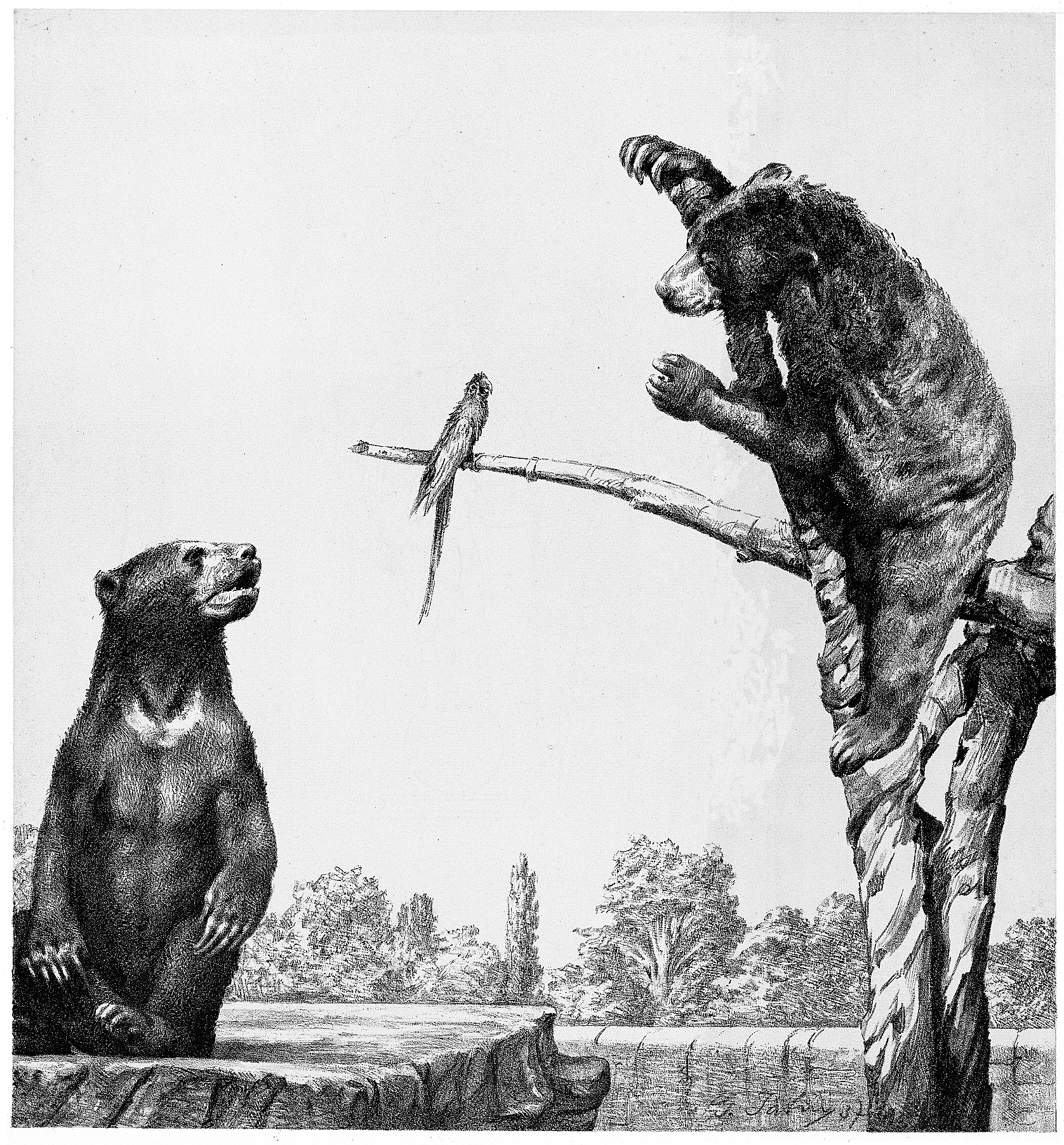
Bears at the Zoo

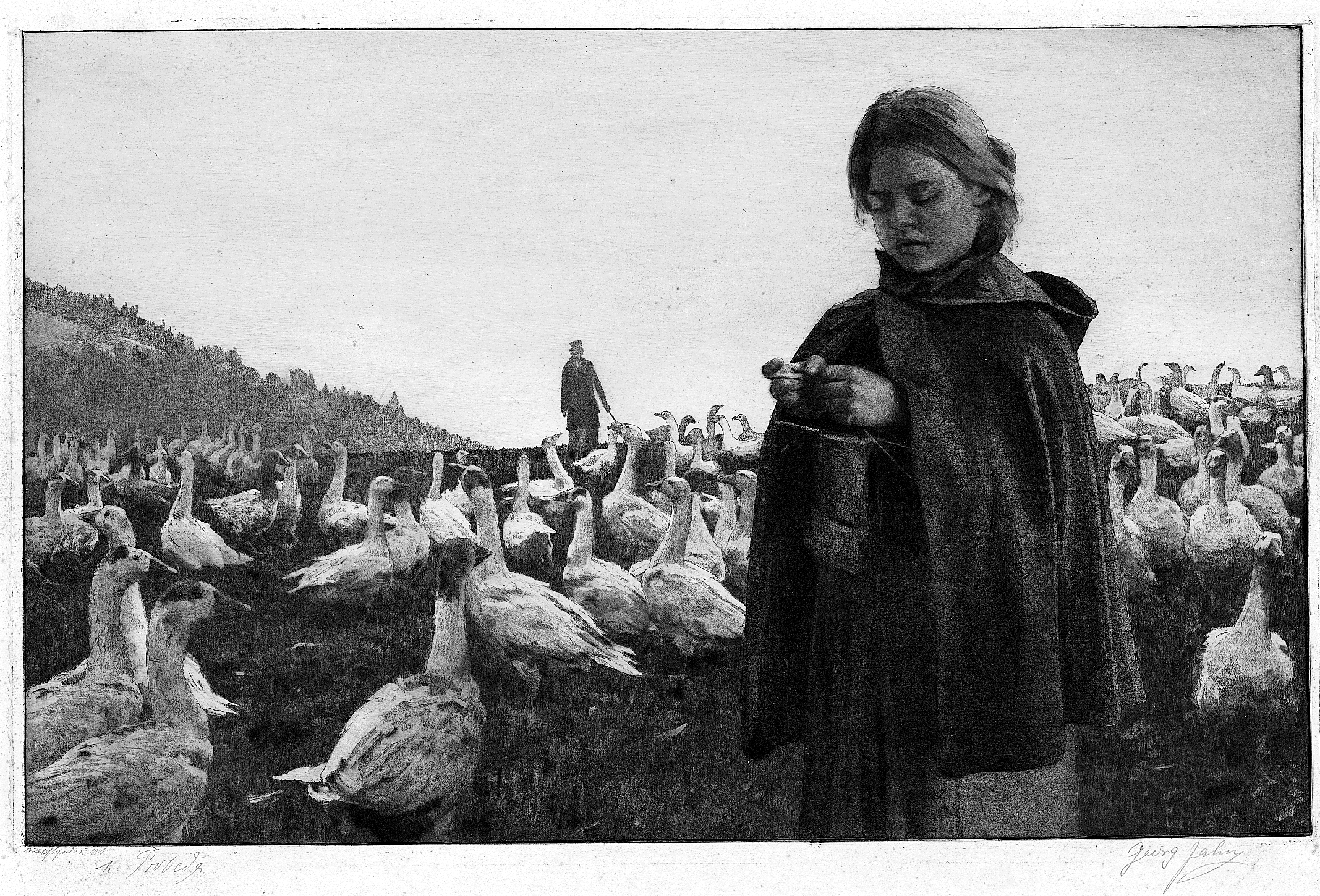
Goose Girl

== Sources ==
- Hans-Georg Jahn: Der Dresdner Radierer Georg Jahn, self-published, Wiesenbach/Heidelberg 1999
- Paul Rausch: "Deutsche Kunst der Gegenwart: Georg Jahn, Meister der Graphik", In: Dresdner Neueste Nachrichten, 10./11. September 1938
- Franz Schubert: "Der Dresdner Radierer Georg Jahn", In: Dresdner Neuste Nachrichten. 8/9. February 1941
- "Jahn, Georg", In: Allgemeines Lexikon der Bildenden Künstler von der Antike bis zur Gegenwart, Vol. 18: Hubatsch–Ingouf, E. A. Seemann, Leipzig 1925
- "Georg Jahn". In: Hans Vollmer (Ed.): Allgemeines Lexikon der bildenden Künstler des XX. Jahrhunderts, Vol.2: E–J. E. A. Seemann, Leipzig 1955, pg.524
