= Oskar Zwintscher =

German painter

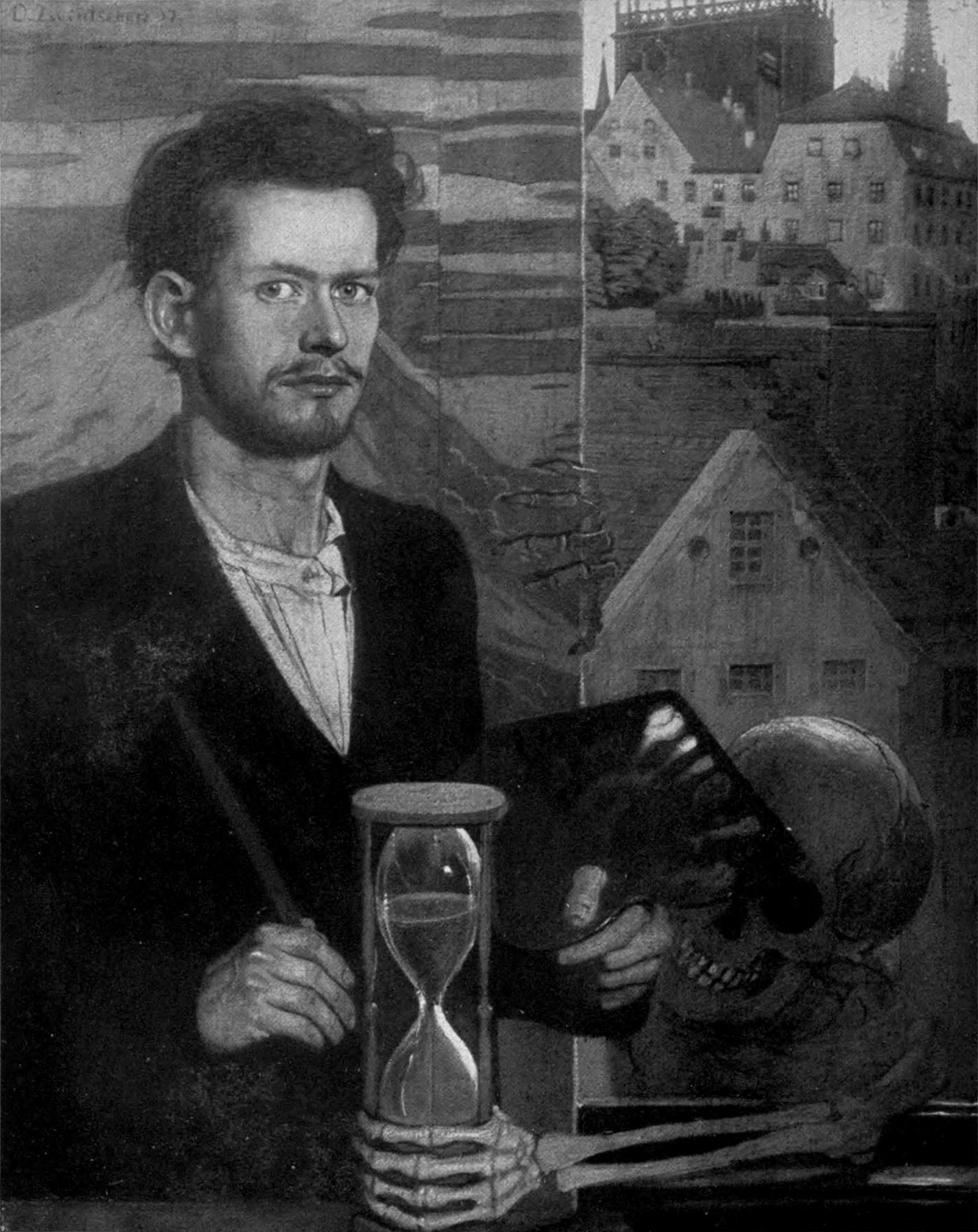
Oskar Zwintscher (1897)

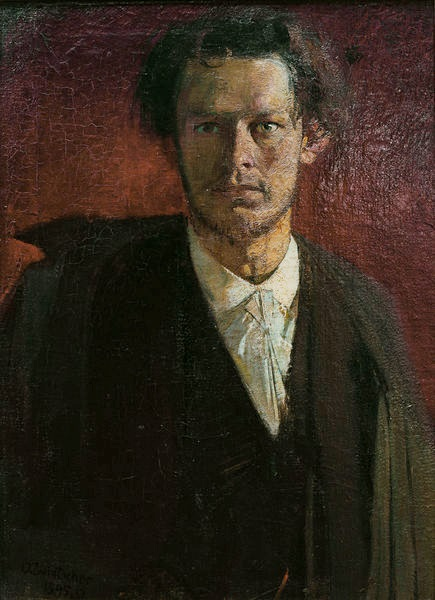
Self-portrait (1895)

Oskar Zwintscher (2 May 1870, in Leipzig – 12 February 1916, in Dresden) was a German painter. He is often associated with the Jugendstil movement.

== Life ==
From 1887 to 1890 he studied at the Hochschule für Grafik und Buchkunst Leipzig and, from 1890 to 1892 was a student of Leon Pohle and Ferdinand Pauwels at the Dresden Academy of Fine Arts. After his studies, he became a free-lance painter in Meißen, where he received a stipendium, awarded to Saxon painters by the "Munkeltsche Legat". This enabled him to work for three years with no financial worries. In 1898, he presented his first large collection of paintings to the public.

That same year, he was a prizewinner at a contest held by the entrepreneur Ludwig Stollwerck to select artists for a new line of trading cards. His first series of cards, "Jahreszeiten" (The Seasons), was published later that year. This was followed in 1900 by "Das Gewitter" (The Tempest). Four years later he, in turn, became a judge at a contest held by Stollwerck and Otto Henkell, selecting illustrations to use in joint advertising campaigns for their chocolate, cocoa and champagne.

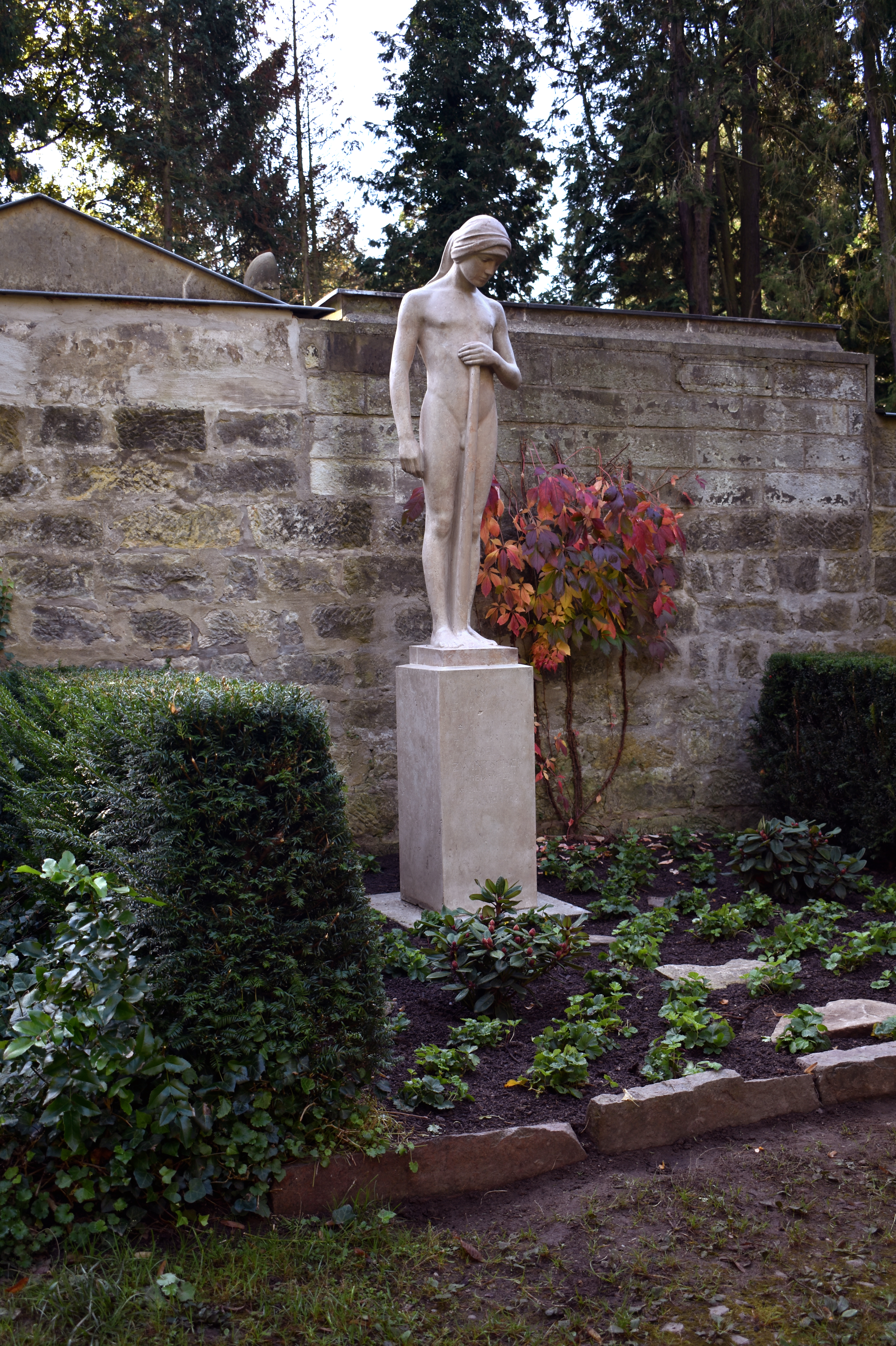
Schneider - Ephebos with Lowered Torch, Zwintscher's grave, Loschwitz

In 1902, at the invitation of his friend Rainer Maria Rilke, he spent some time at the art colony in Worpswede. From 1903, he served as a professor at the Dresden Academy. He was described as thorough and pedantic and was an unshakable opponent of impressionism. Despite this, and his involvement with advertising, much of his work is openly erotic or has an eerie quality. His style has been likened to a contemporary version of Holbein or Cranach, but also contains elements of Art Nouveau.

He is buried in Loschwitz Cemetery. The figure on his grave (an ephebos with a lowered torch) was designed by Sascha Schneider.

== Selected paintings ==
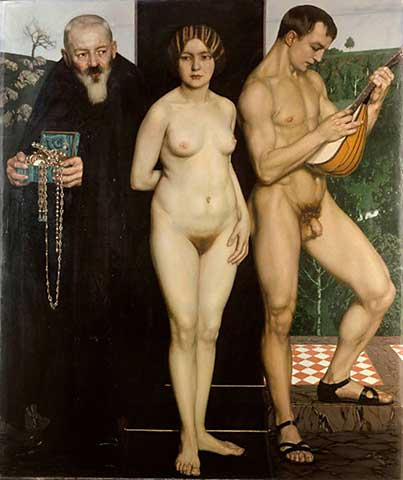
Between Jewelry and Song

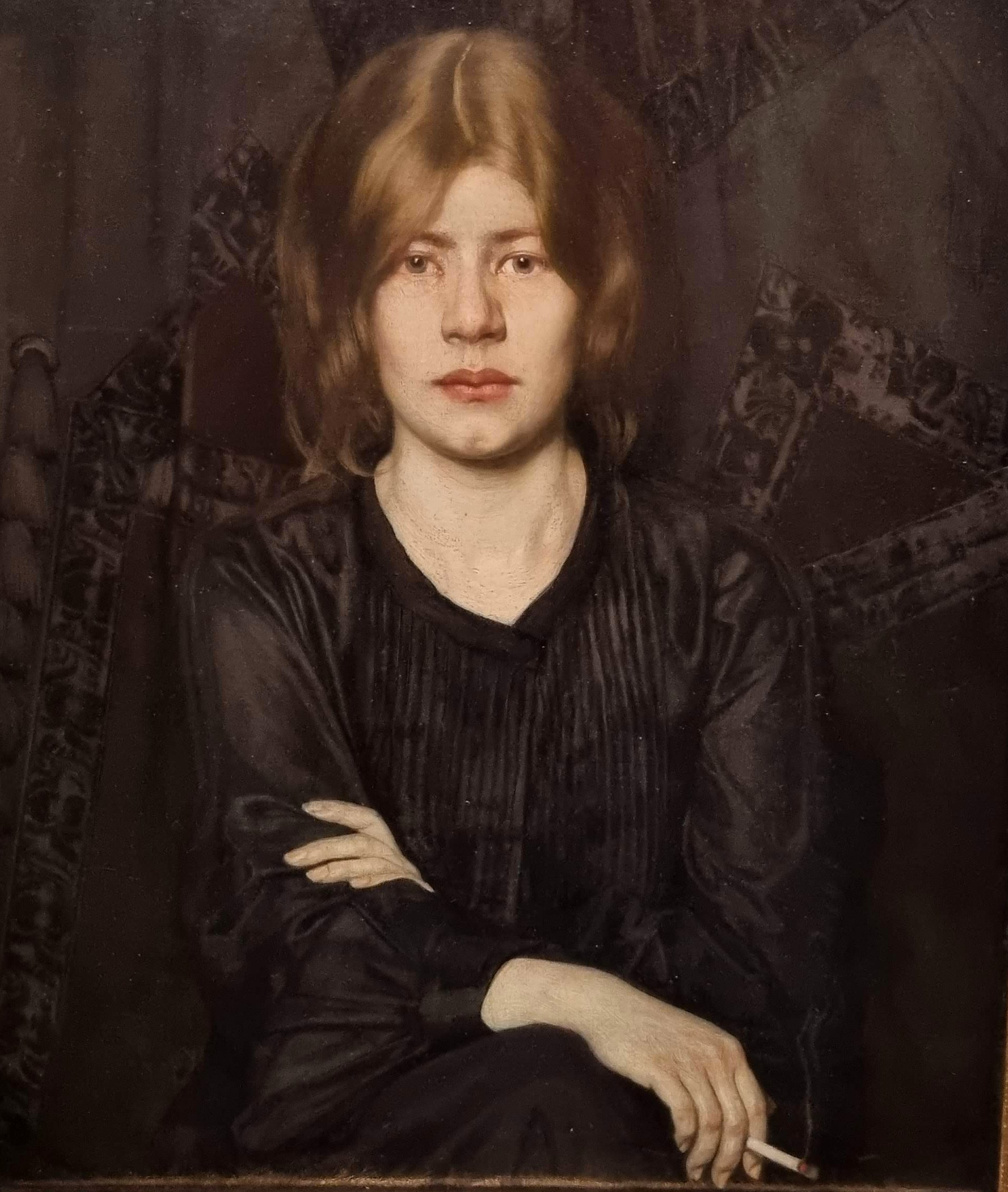
Lady with Cigarette

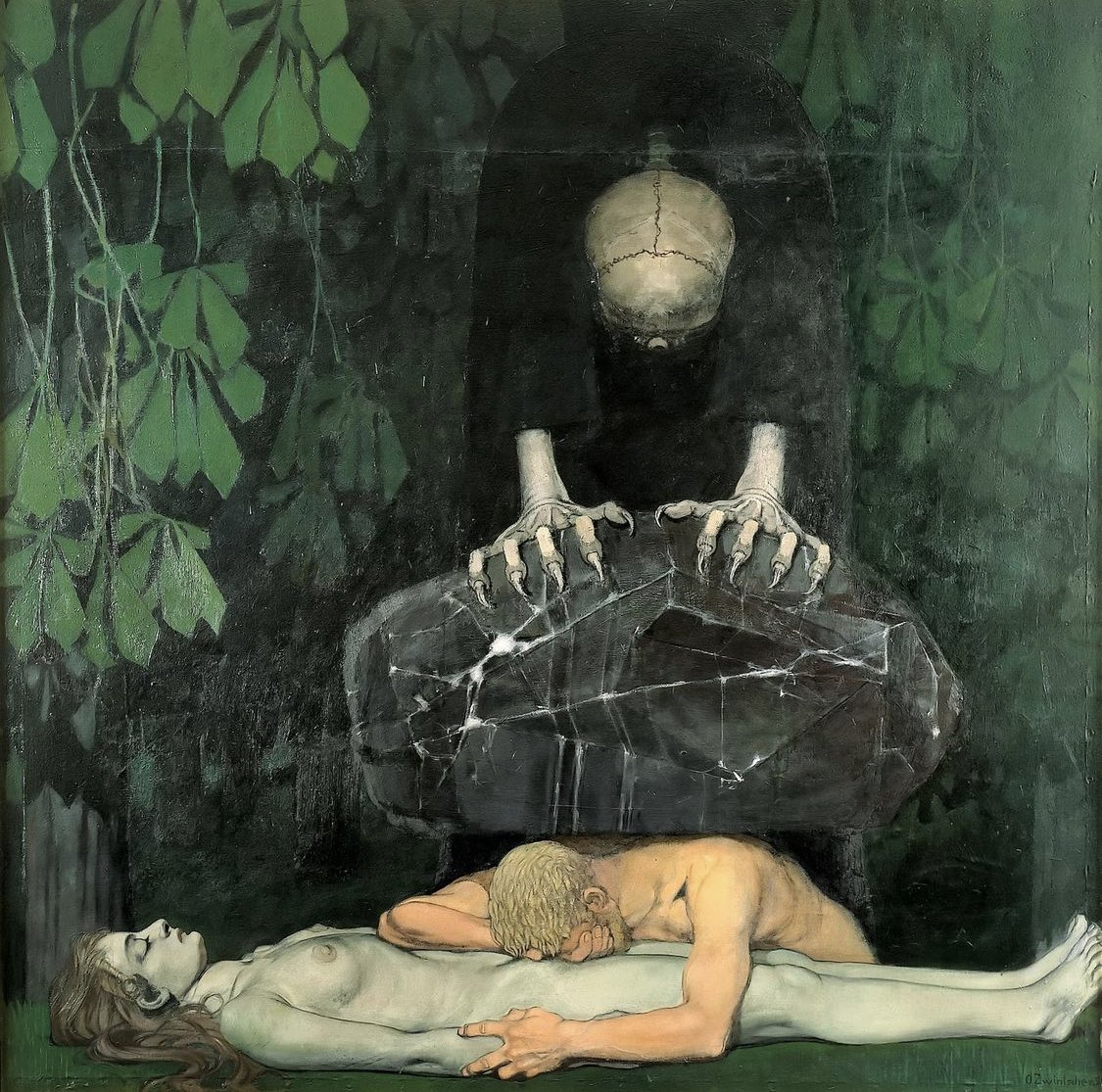
Grief

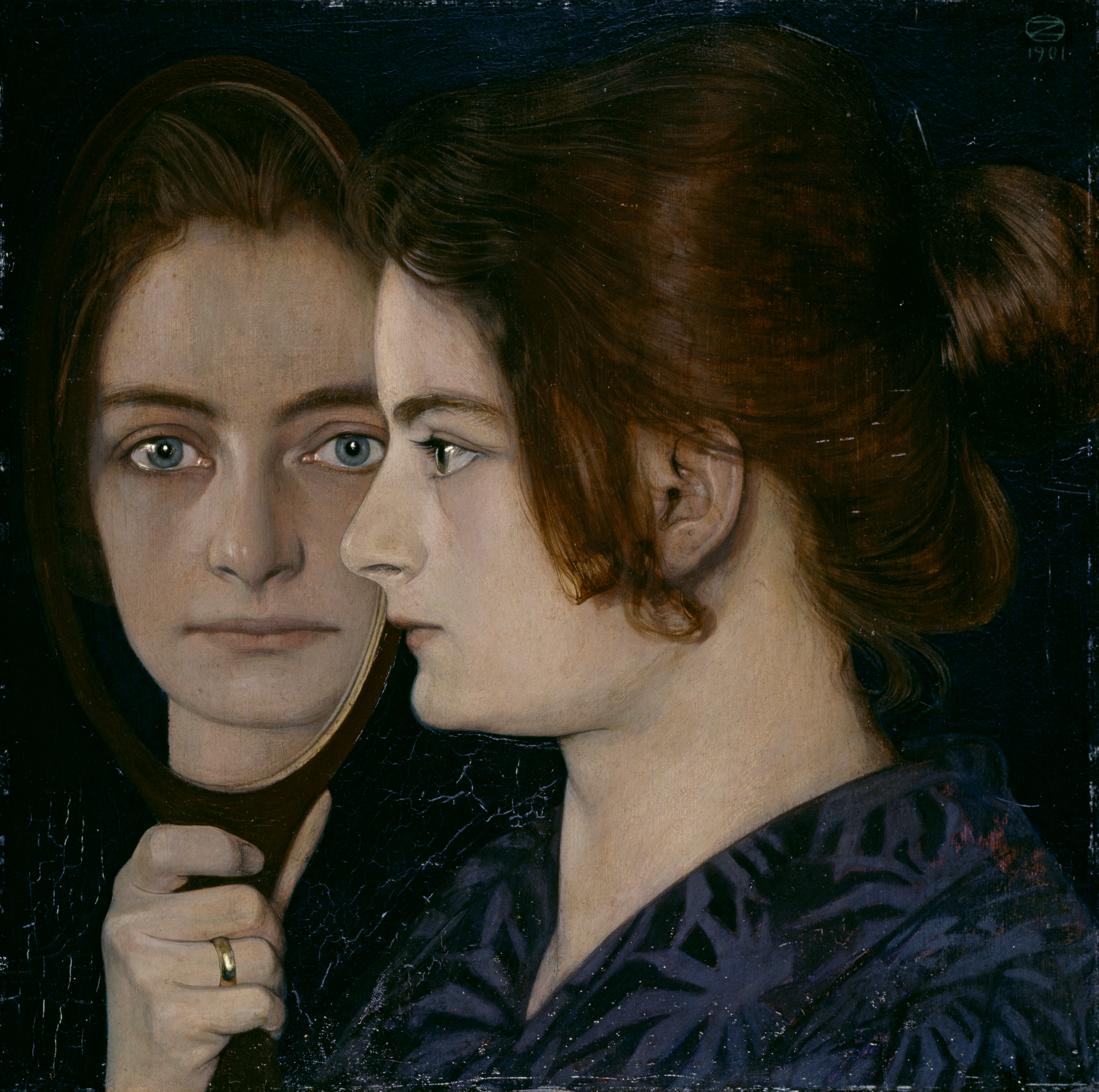
Mirror Portrait
