= Ferdinand Pauwels =

Belgian painter

Wilhelm Ferdinand Pauwels
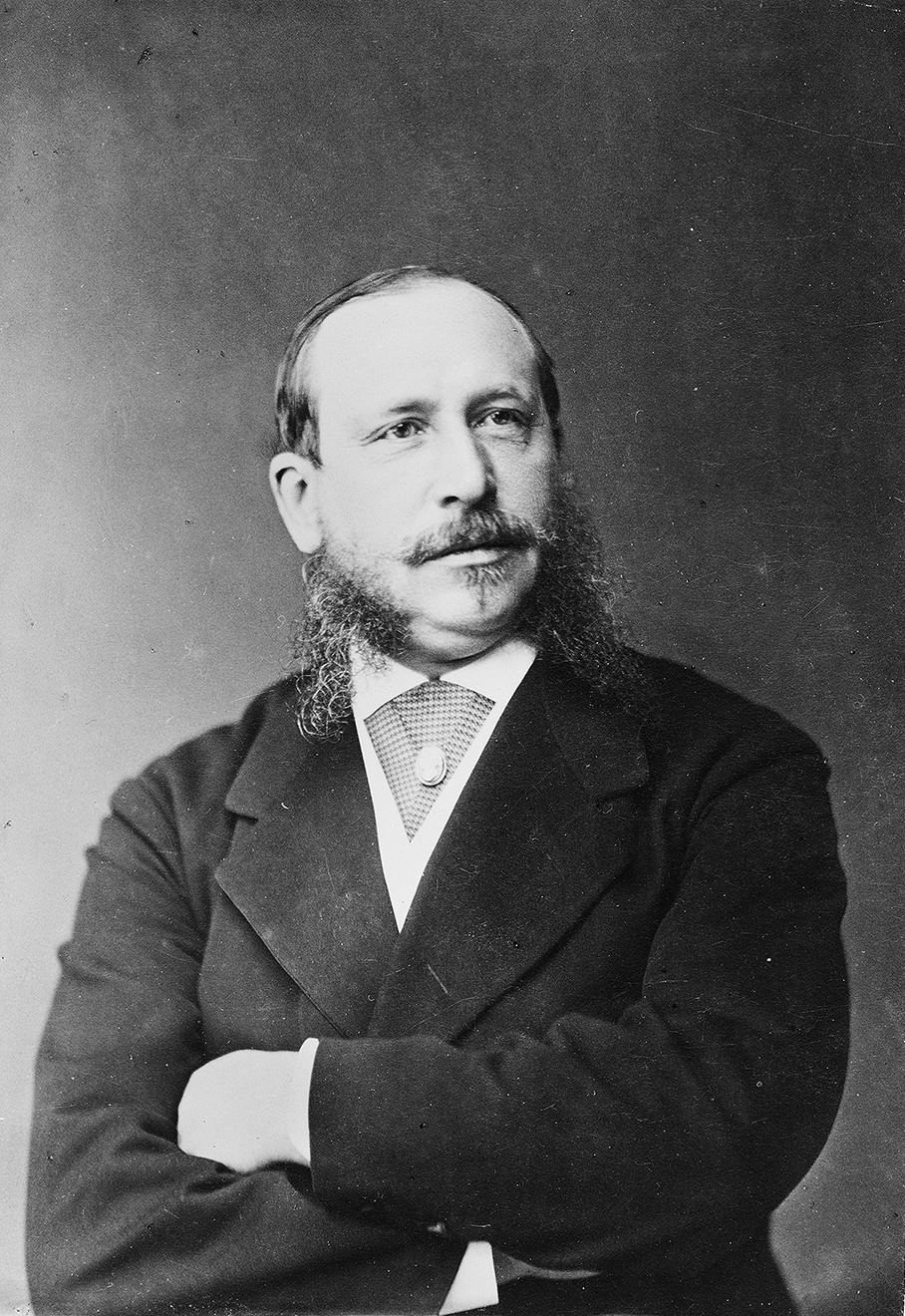
- Born: 13 April 1830; Ekeren, Belgium
- Died: 26 March 1904 (aged 73); Dresden, Germany
- Occupation: history painter

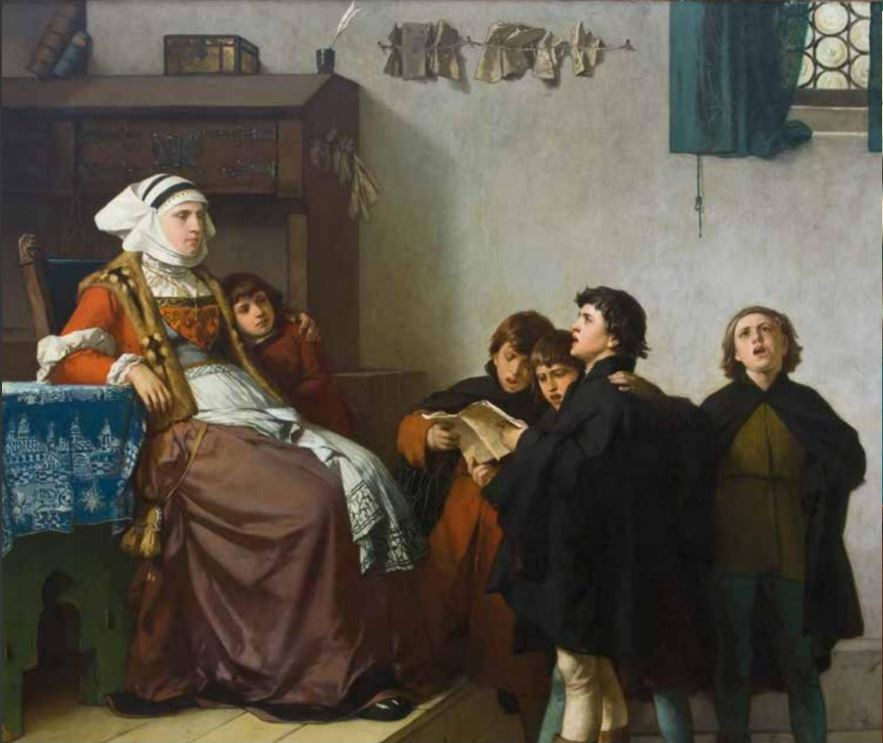
Young Martin Luther and Carolers Sing for Mrs. Cotta in Eisenach (1872)

Wilhelm Ferdinand Pauwels ([ˈpʌu̯əls]; 13 April 1830, Ekeren – 26 March 1904, Dresden) was a Belgian history painter who lived and worked in Germany.

== Life ==
From 1842 to 1850, he studied at the Royal Academy of Fine Arts (Antwerp), under Gustave Wappers and Nicaise De Keyser, where he became an outstanding colorist. In 1852 he won the Prix de Rome (Belgium) for his painting Coriolanus at Rome and was able to spend four years studying in Italy.

From 1862 to 1872, he was the Professor of History Painting at the Weimar Saxon-Grand Ducal Art School. Leon Pohle, Max Liebermann and Carl Rodeck were among his students there. This period was especially productive for him and he completed seven large wall panels at the Wartburg, depicting the life of Martin Luther.

After a short stay in Belgium, he returned to Germany, where he became a professor at the Dresden Academy of Fine Arts. His students there included Ludwig von Hofmann, Osmar Schindler, Paul Thumann and Oskar Zwintscher. During this period he also executed six large historical wall panels at the Fürstenschule in Meissen.

From 1870 to 1881, he produced what was considered his greatest work: twelve frescoes in the upper part of the Ypres Cloth Hall, which had been left incomplete by Charles de Groux. They depicted scenes of Ypres' history from 1187 to 1383. Unfortunately, these works (and most of the Cloth Hall) were destroyed during World War I. In 2000, the city of Ypres acquired six paintings by Pauwels for their Municipal Art Museum at a cost of 3,250,000 Belgian Francs (approximately 80,565 Euros)

In 1930, Ekeren named a street in his honor and installed a memorial stone.
