= Sascha Schneider =

German artist (1870–1927)

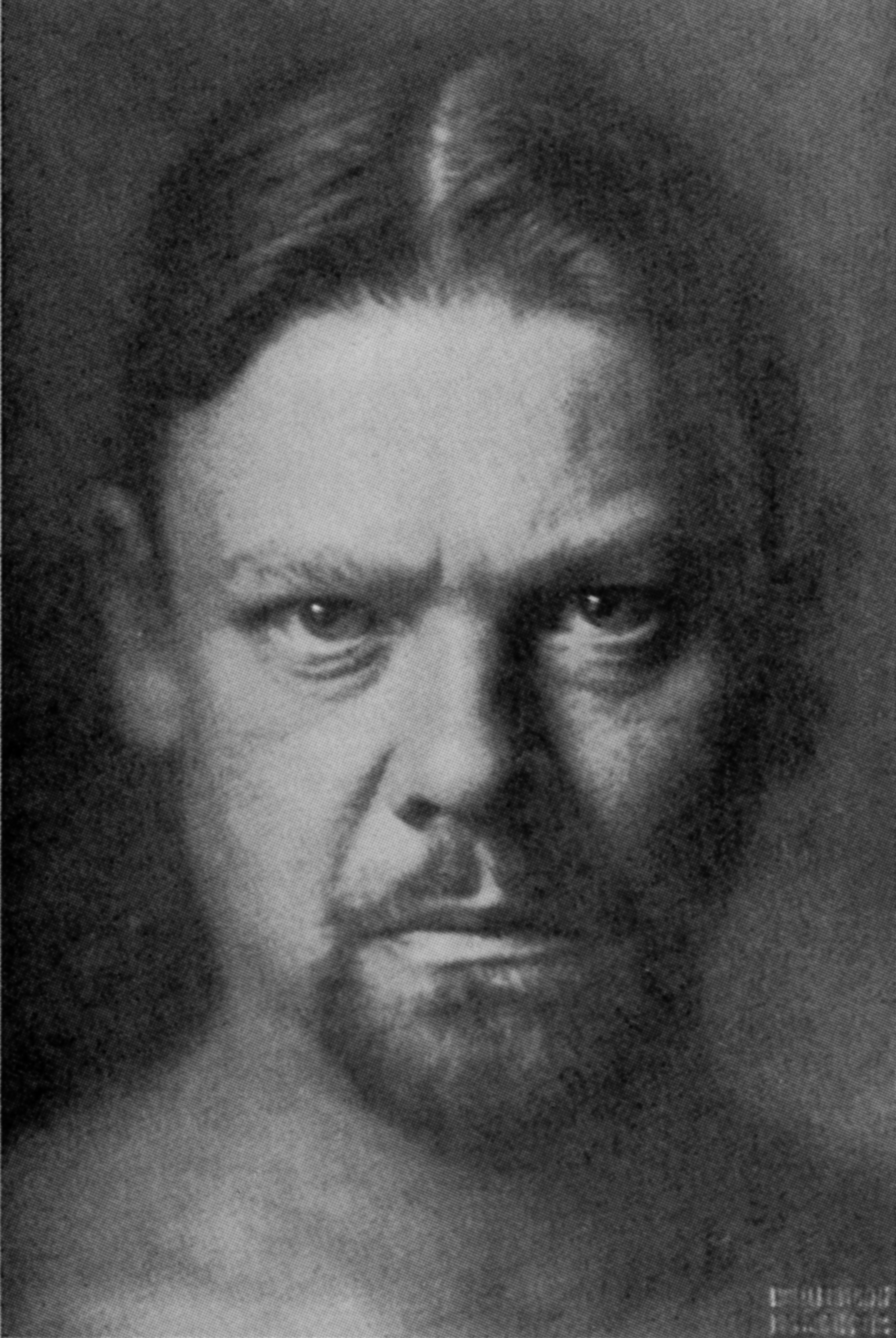
- Schneider in 1904
- Born: Rudolph Karl Alexander Schneider; 21 September 1870; Saint Petersburg, Russian Empire
- Died: 18 August 1927 (aged 56); Swinemünde, Weimar Germany (now Świnoujście, Poland)
- Education: Dresden Academy of Fine Arts
- Known for: Painting, sculpture

Rudolph Karl Alexander Schneider, commonly known as Sascha Schneider (21 September 1870 – 18 August 1927), was a German painter and sculptor.

== Biography ==
Schneider was born in Saint Petersburg in 1870. During his childhood, his family lived in Zürich, but following the death of his father, Schneider moved to Dresden, where he became a student at the Dresden Academy of Fine Arts in 1889. In 1903, he met best-selling author Karl May, and subsequently became the cover illustrator of a number of May's books including Winnetou, Old Surehand, Am Rio de la Plata. A year later in 1904, Schneider was appointed professor at the Großherzoglich-Sächsische Kunstschule Weimar.

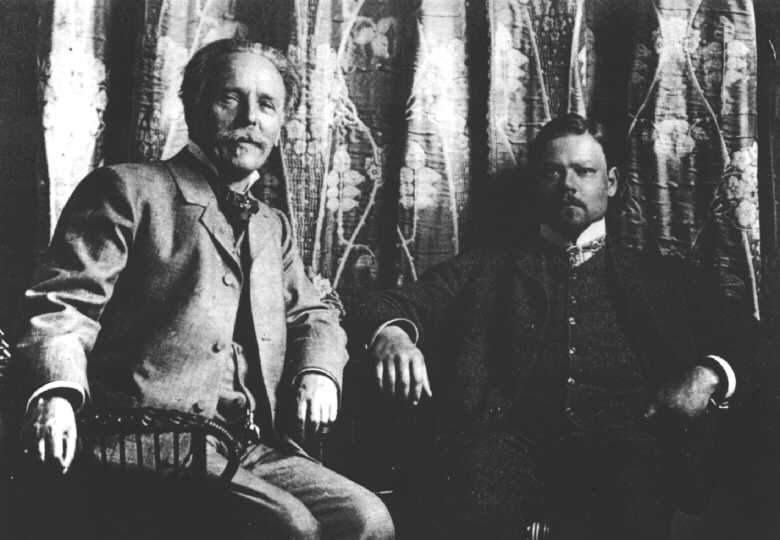
Sascha Schneider (right) with Karl May, 1904

During this period, Schneider lived with painter Hellmuth Jahn. Jahn began blackmailing Schneider by threatening to expose his homosexuality, which was punishable under § 175 of the penal code. Schneider fled to Italy, where homosexuality was not criminalized at that time. In Italy, Schneider met painter Robert Spies, with whom he traveled through the Caucasus Mountains. He then traveled back to Germany, where he lived for six months in Leipzig before returning to Italy, where he resided in Florence. When the First World War started, Schneider returned to Germany again, taking up residence in Hellerau (near Dresden). After 1918, he co-founded an institute called Kraft-Kunst for bodybuilding. Some of the models for his art trained here.

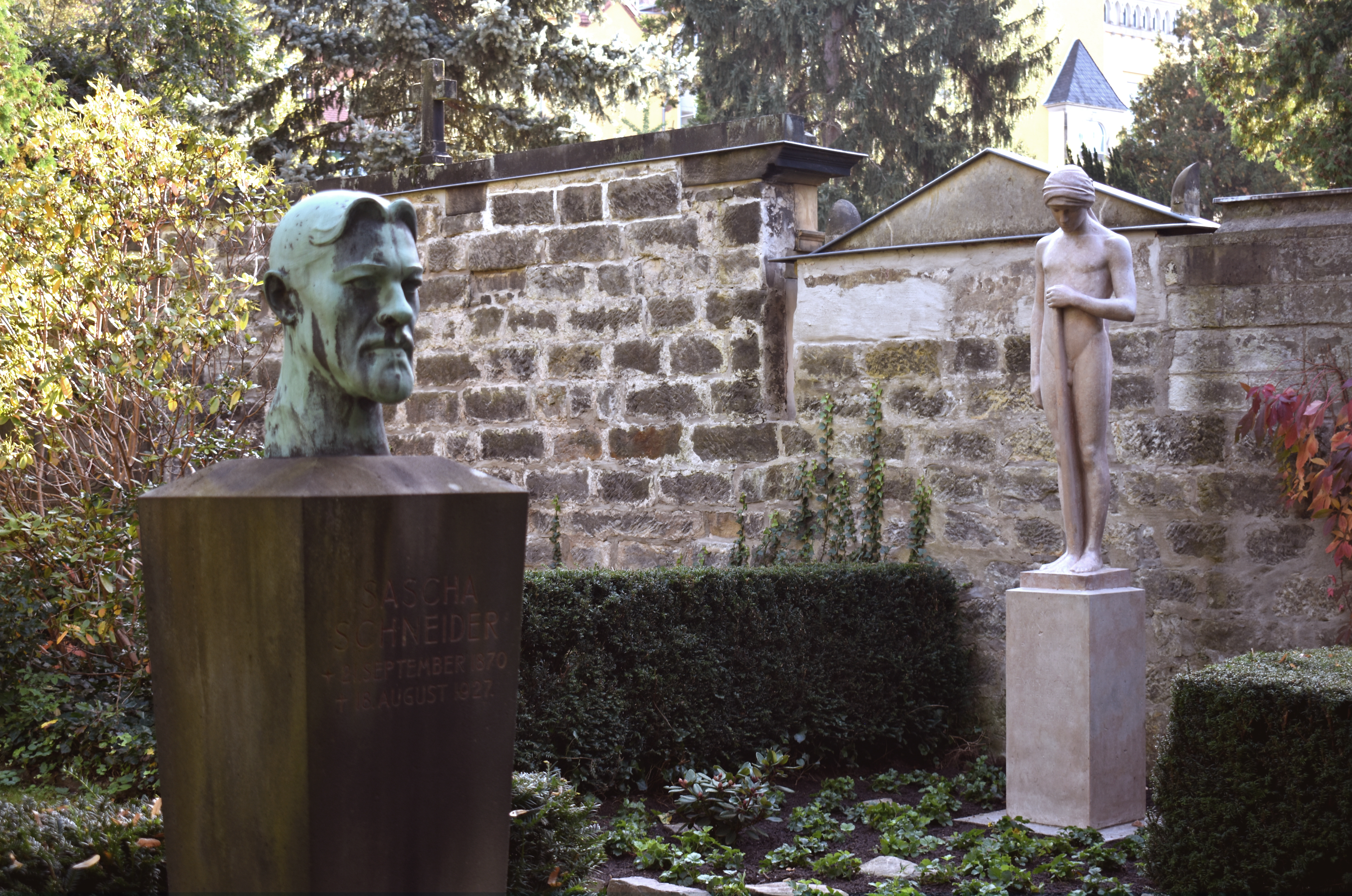
Grave of Sascha Schneider at Loschwitz Cemetery, Dresden, a short distance from his sculpture (1916) for the grave of the painter Oskar Zwintscher

Schneider, who suffered from diabetes mellitus, suffered a diabetic seizure during a ship voyage in the vicinity of Swinemünde. As a result, he collapsed and died in 1927 in Swinemünde. He was buried in Loschwitz Cemetery, Germany.

== In popular culture ==
Schneider's painting Hypnosis (in Gallery below) inspired a key shot in the Robert Eggers film The Lighthouse, as well as inspiring the Corpse of King Minos' eyes in Ultrakill.

== Works ==
- Mein Gestalten und Bilden. 1912. autobiography

== Exhibitions ==
- Sascha Schneider - Ideenmaler & Körperbildner/"Sascha Schneider - Visualizing ideas through the human body" (2013), Stadtmuseum Weimar
- "Nude in Public: Sascha Schneider - Homoeroticism and the Male Form circa 1900" (2013), Leslie-Lohman Museum of Gay and Lesbian Art

== Gallery ==
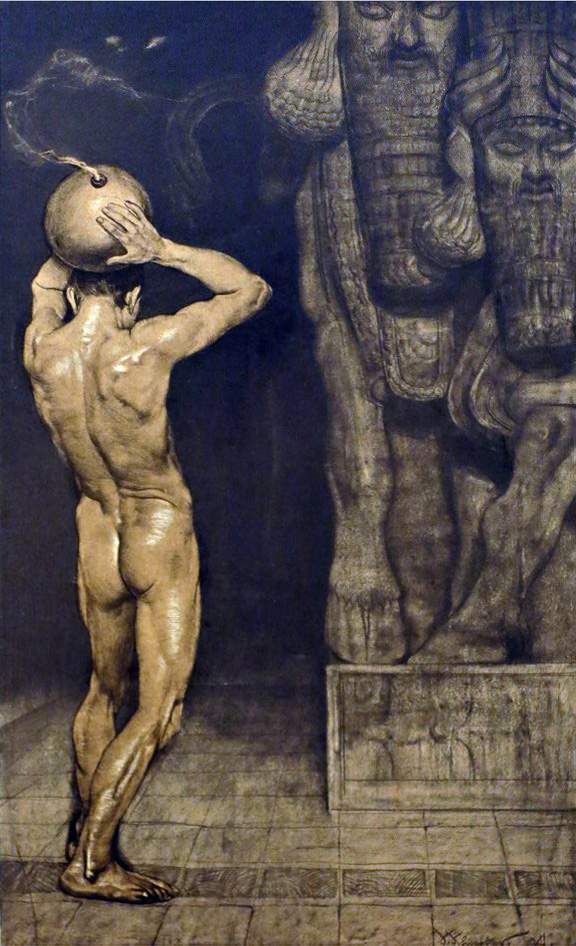
The Anarchist (1894)

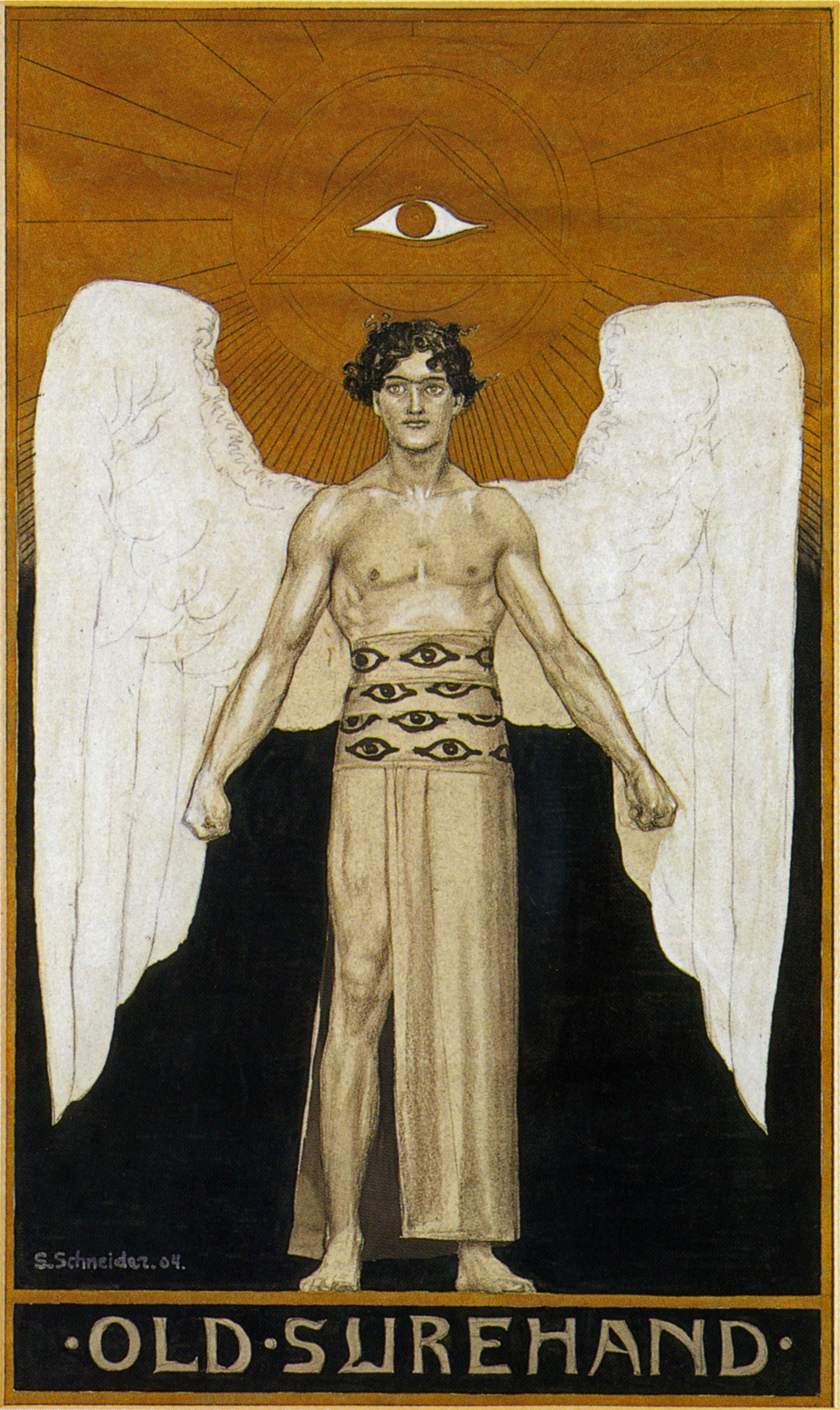
Cover illustration for Old Surehand by Karl May (1904)

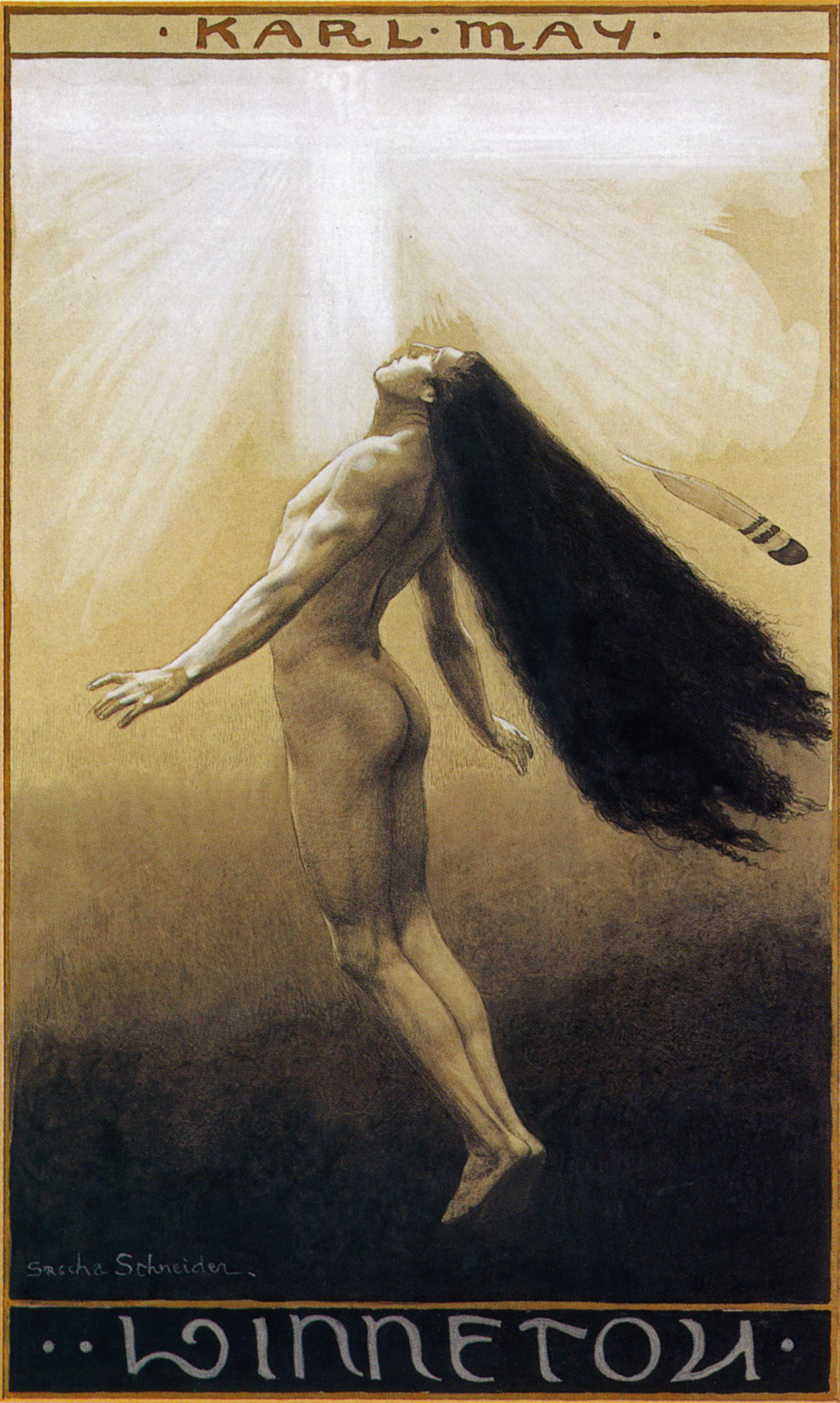
Cover illustration for Winnetou III by Karl May (1904)

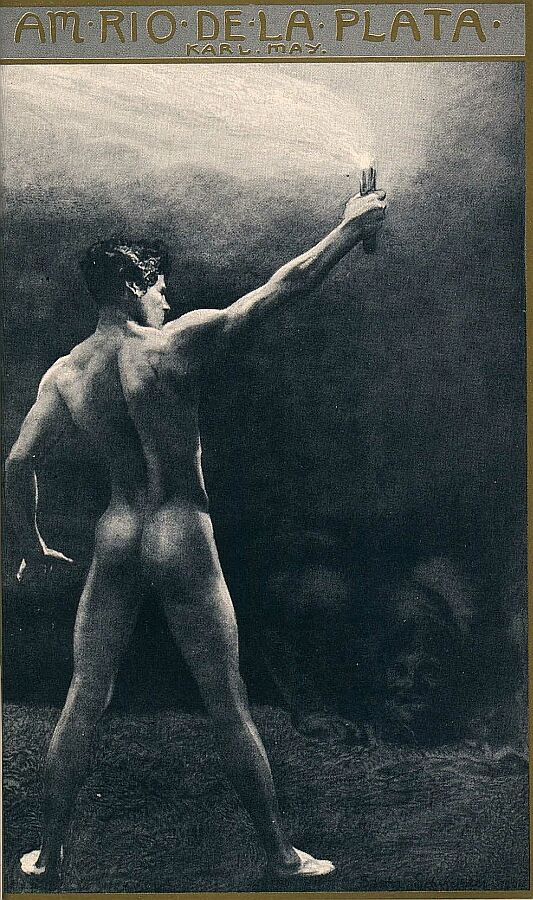
Cover illustration for Am Rio De La Plata by Karl May (1904)

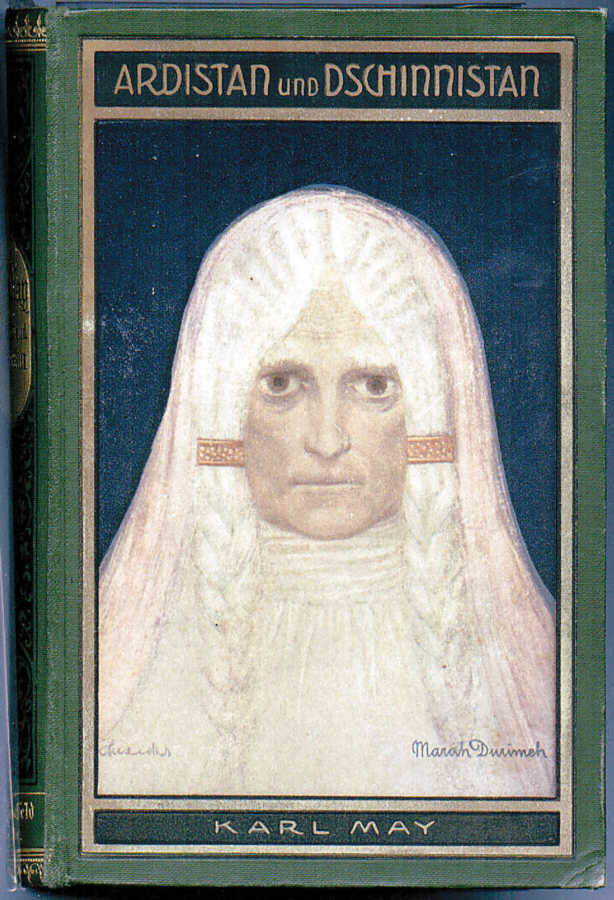
Cover illustration for Ardistan und Dschinnistan by Karl May (1904)

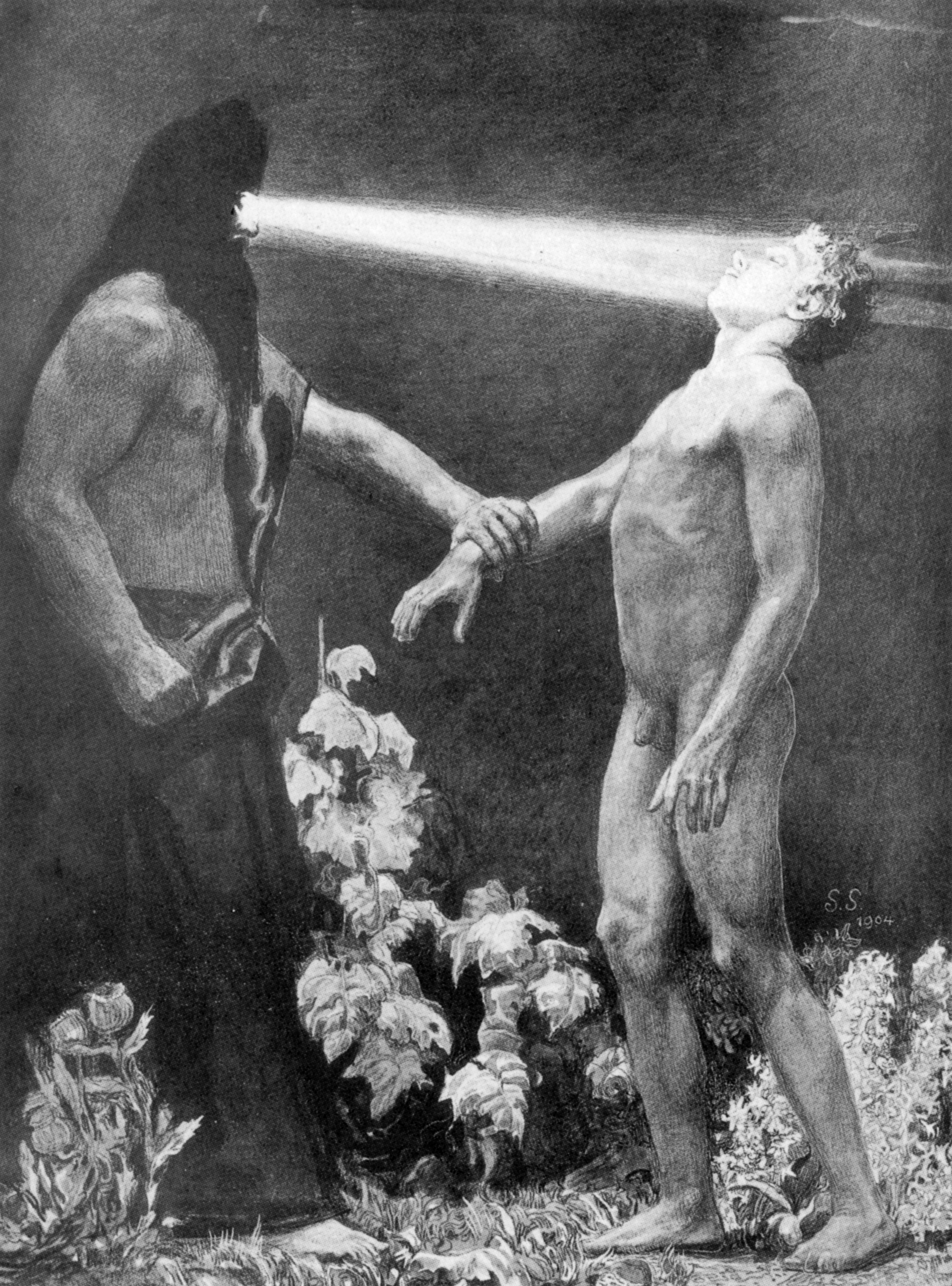
Hypnosis (1904)

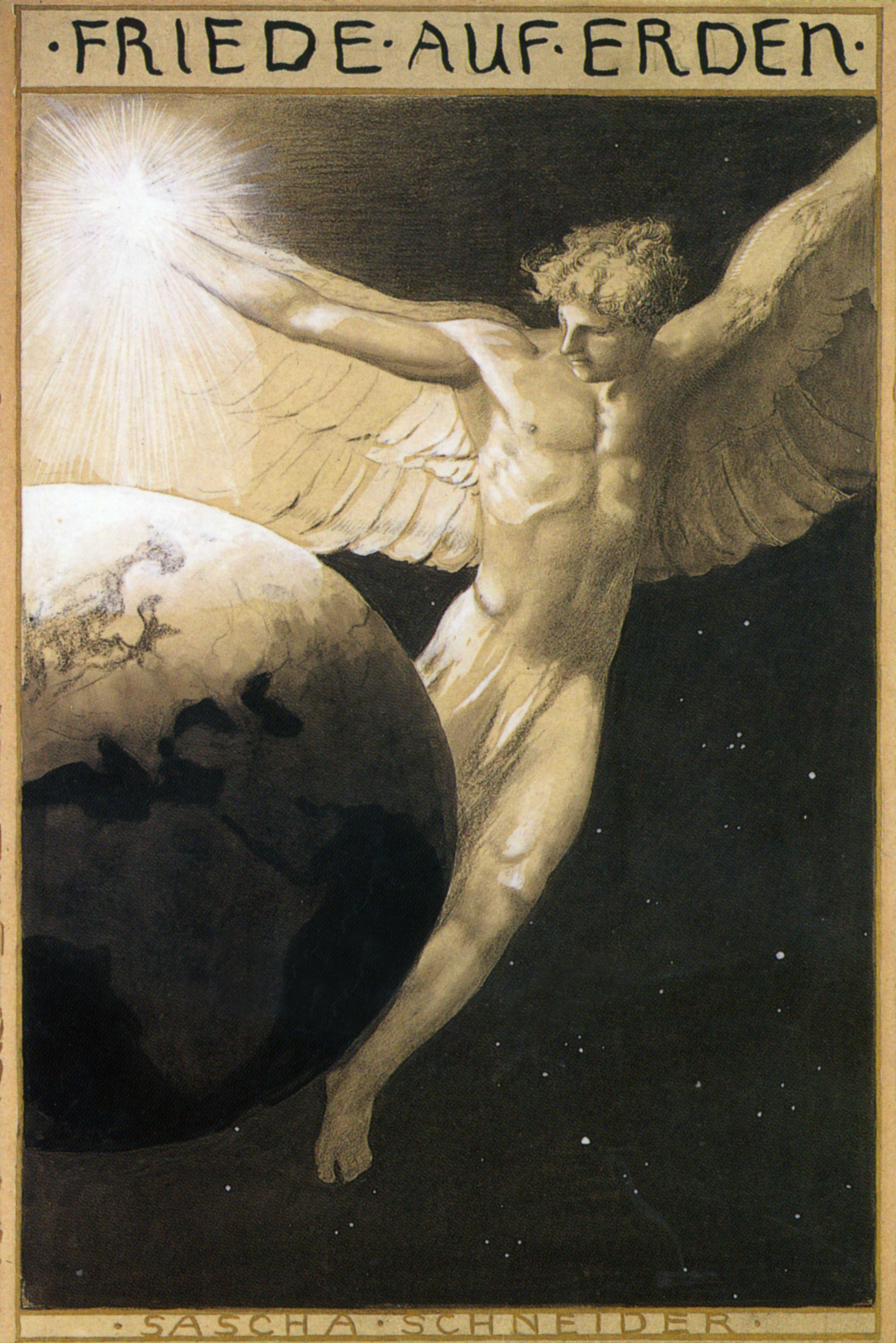
Peace on Earth (1904)

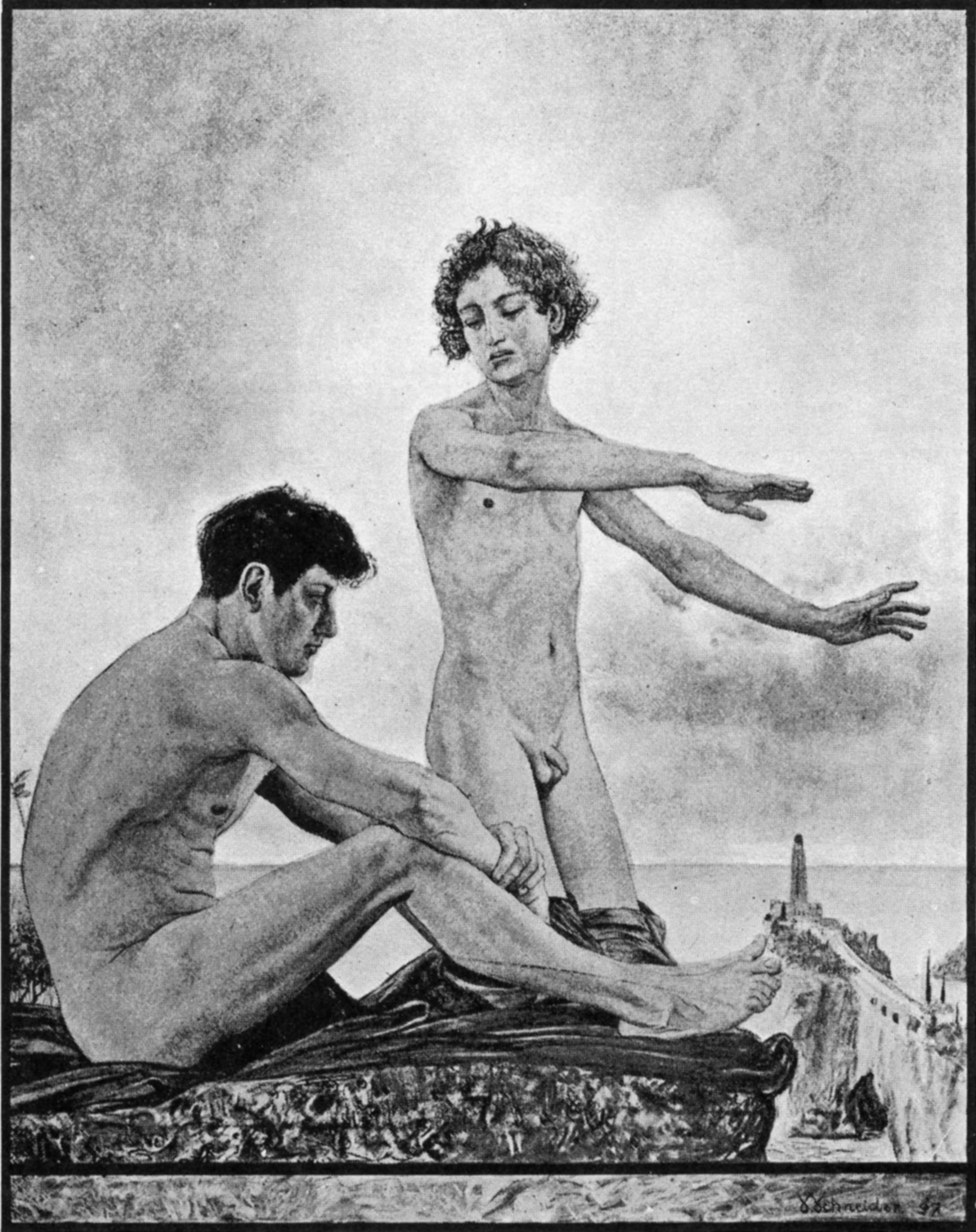
Dawn (1905)

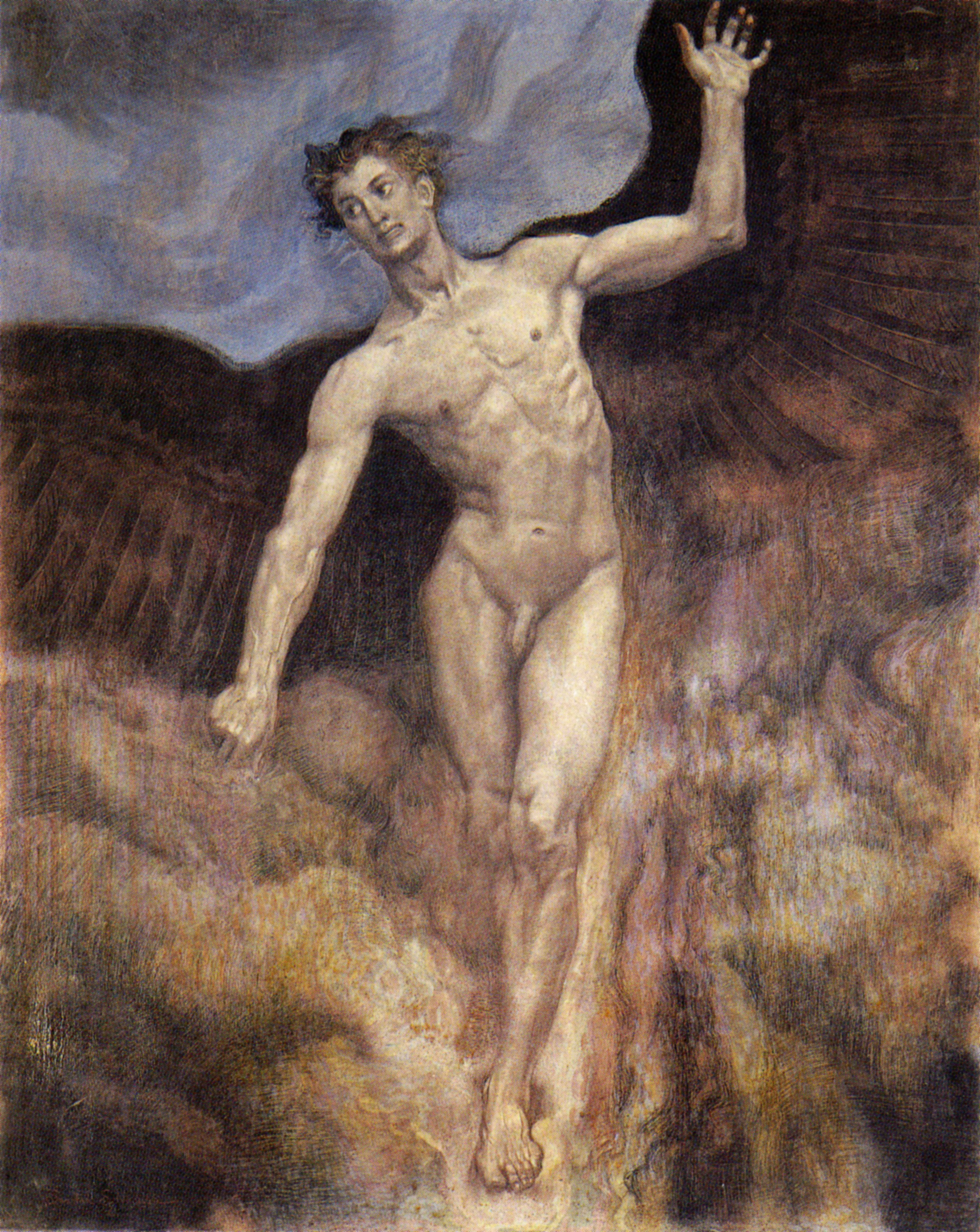
Icarus (1906)

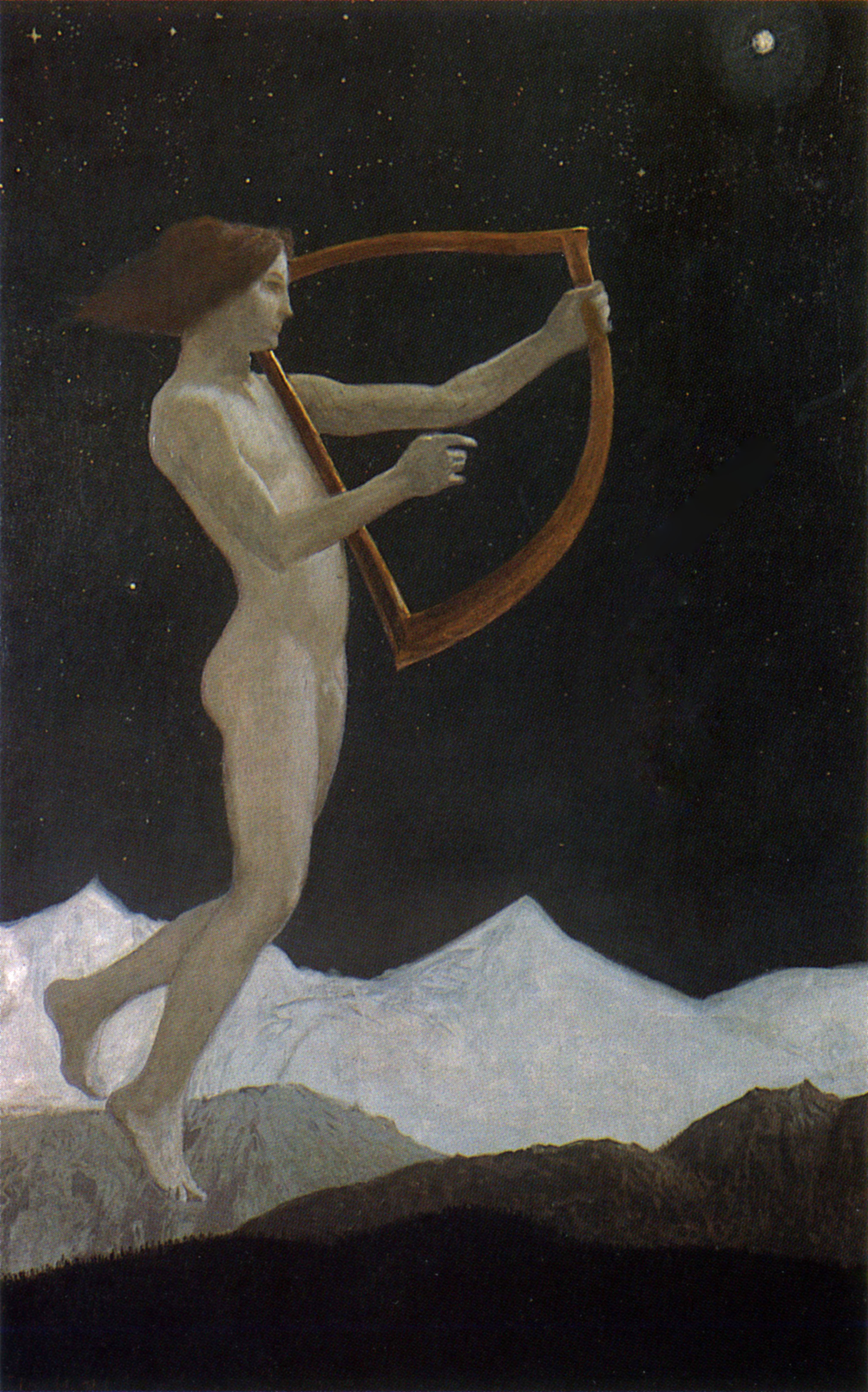
Moon Night (1906)

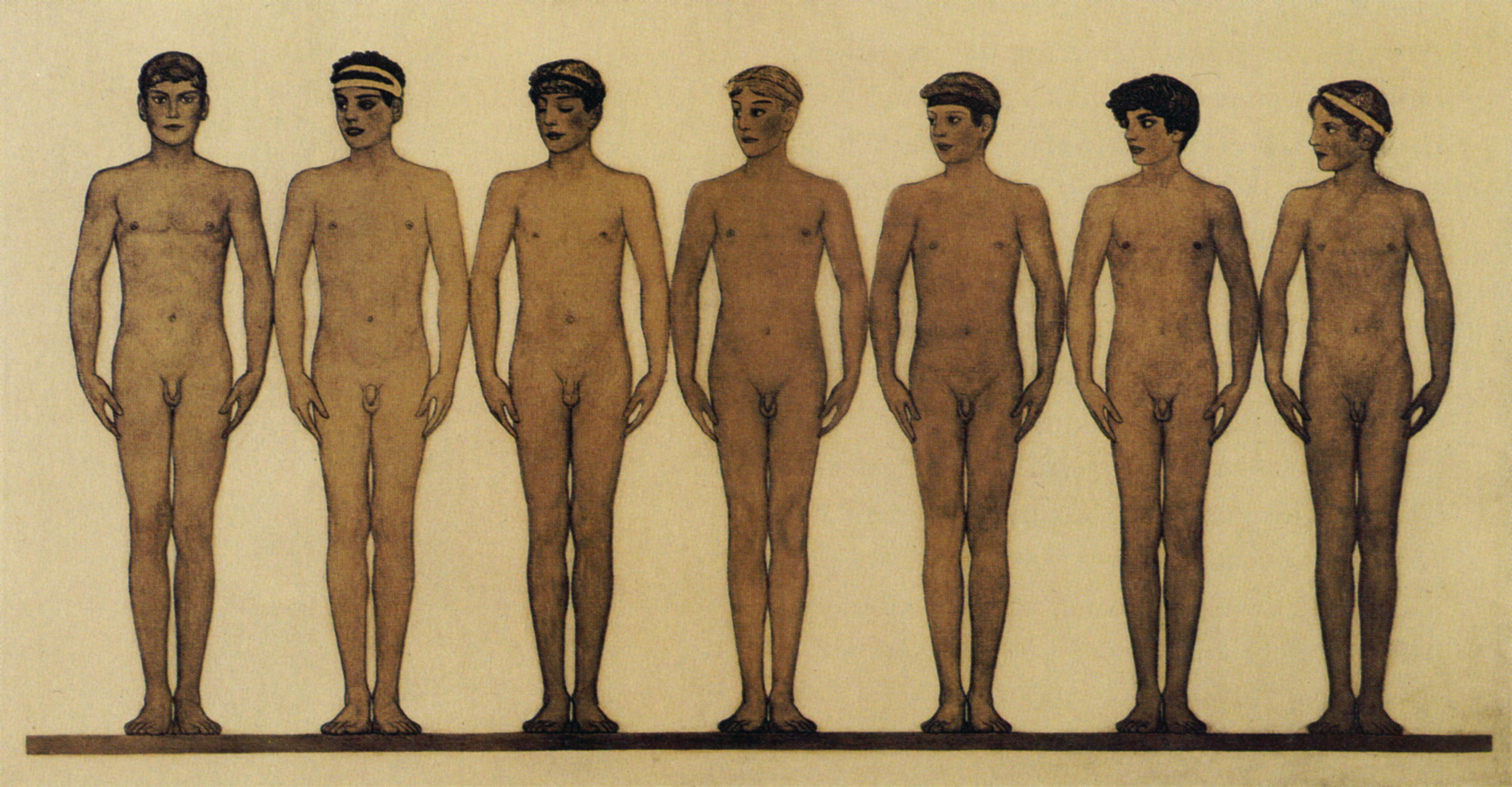
Gymnasion (ca. 1912)

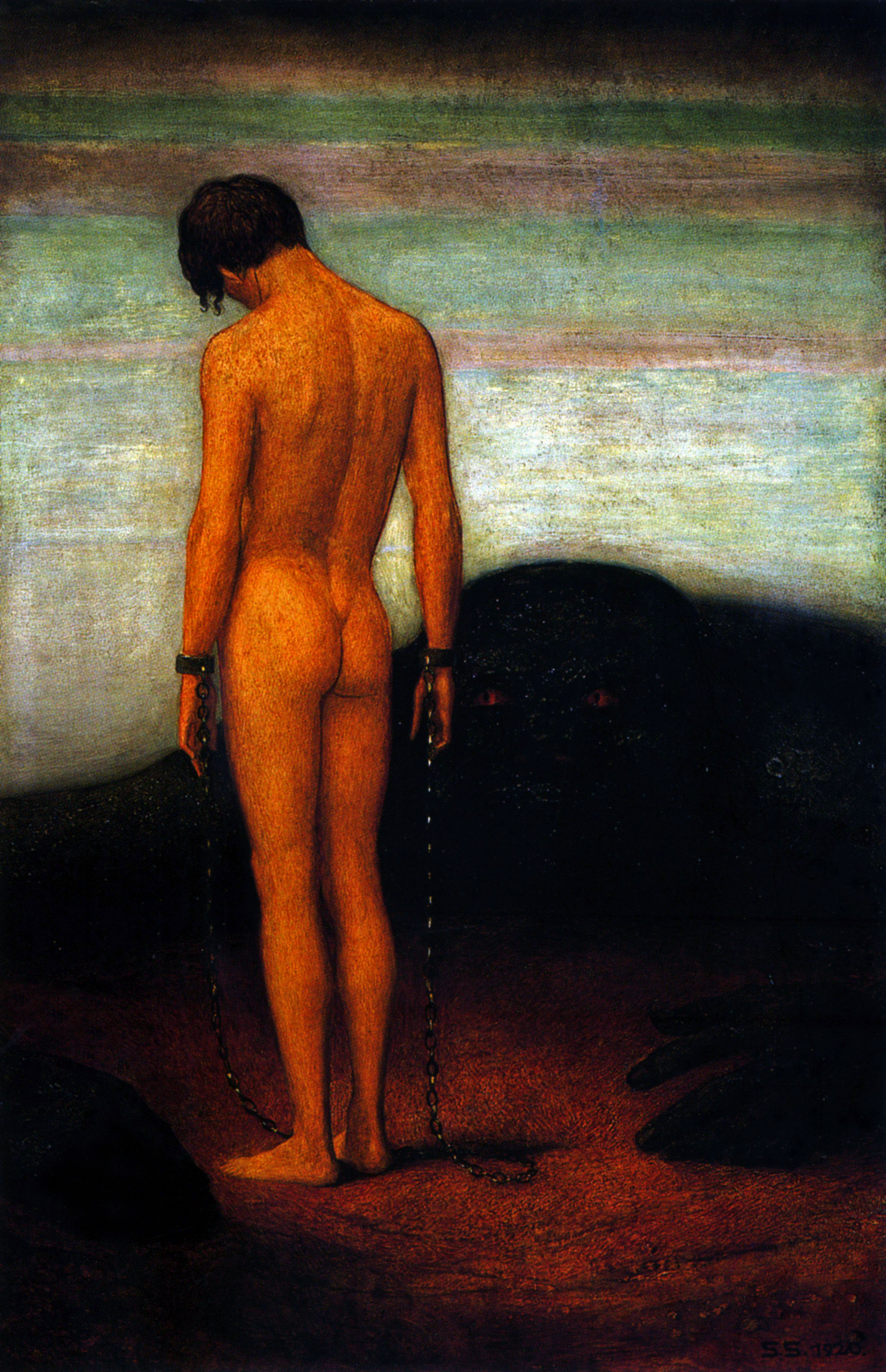
Feeling of Dependence (1920)

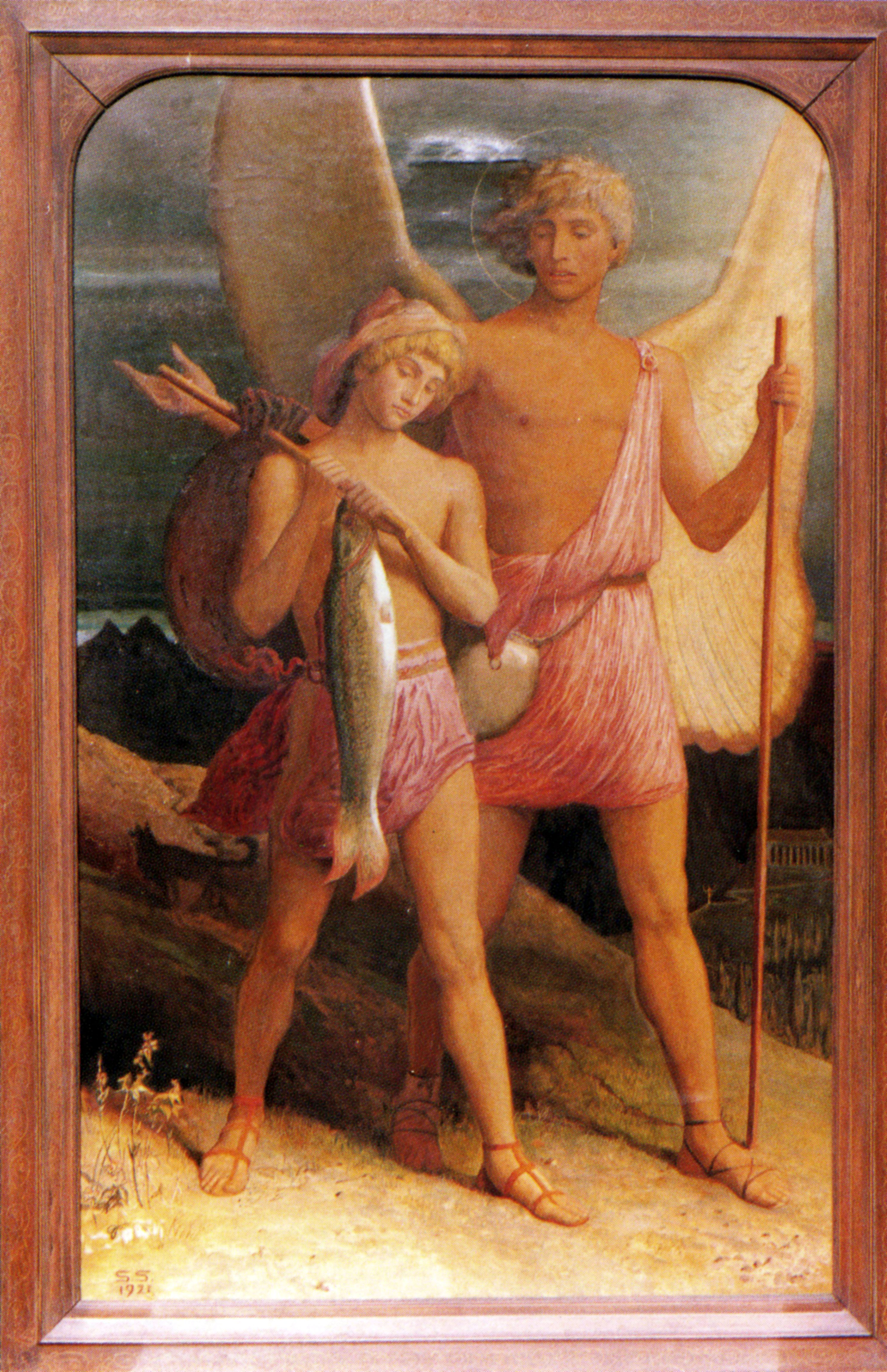
Tobias and the Angel (1921)

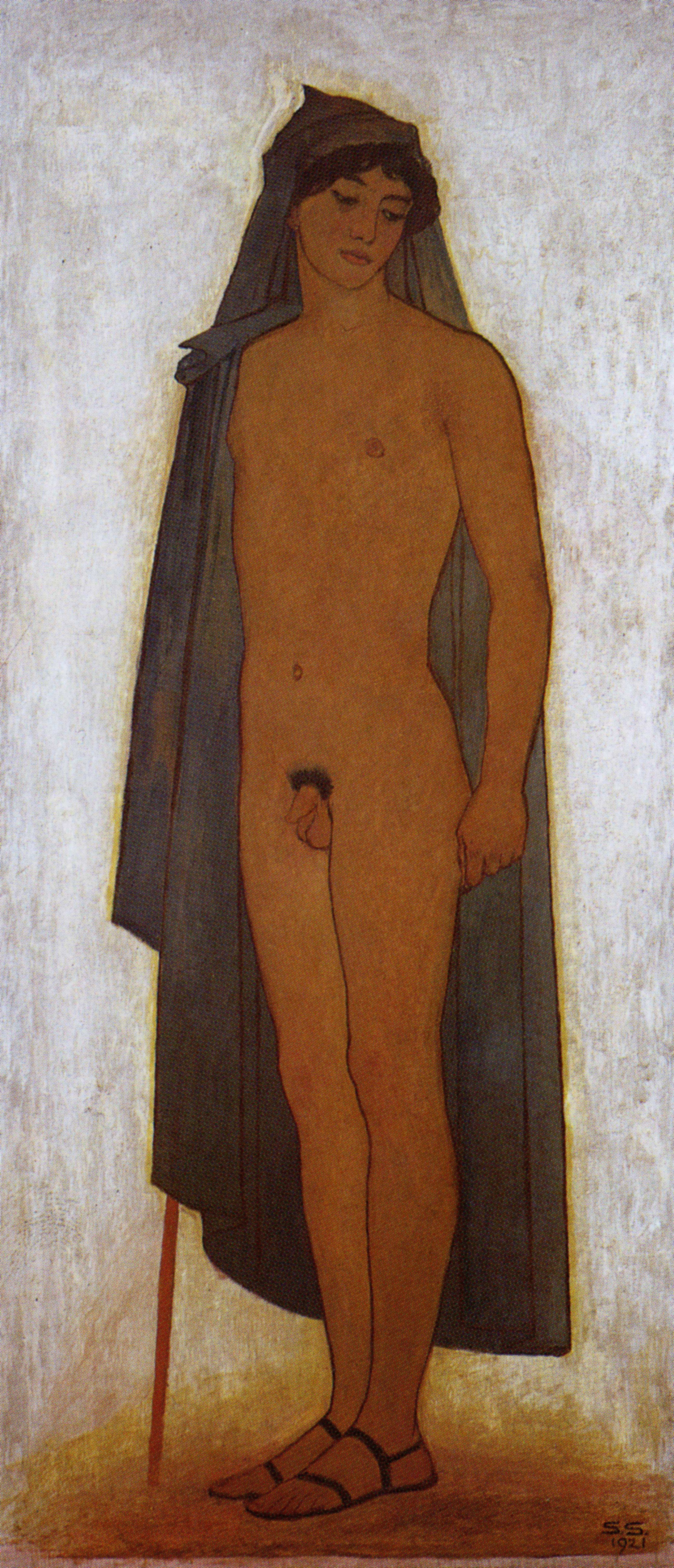
Youth in a Blue Coat (1921)

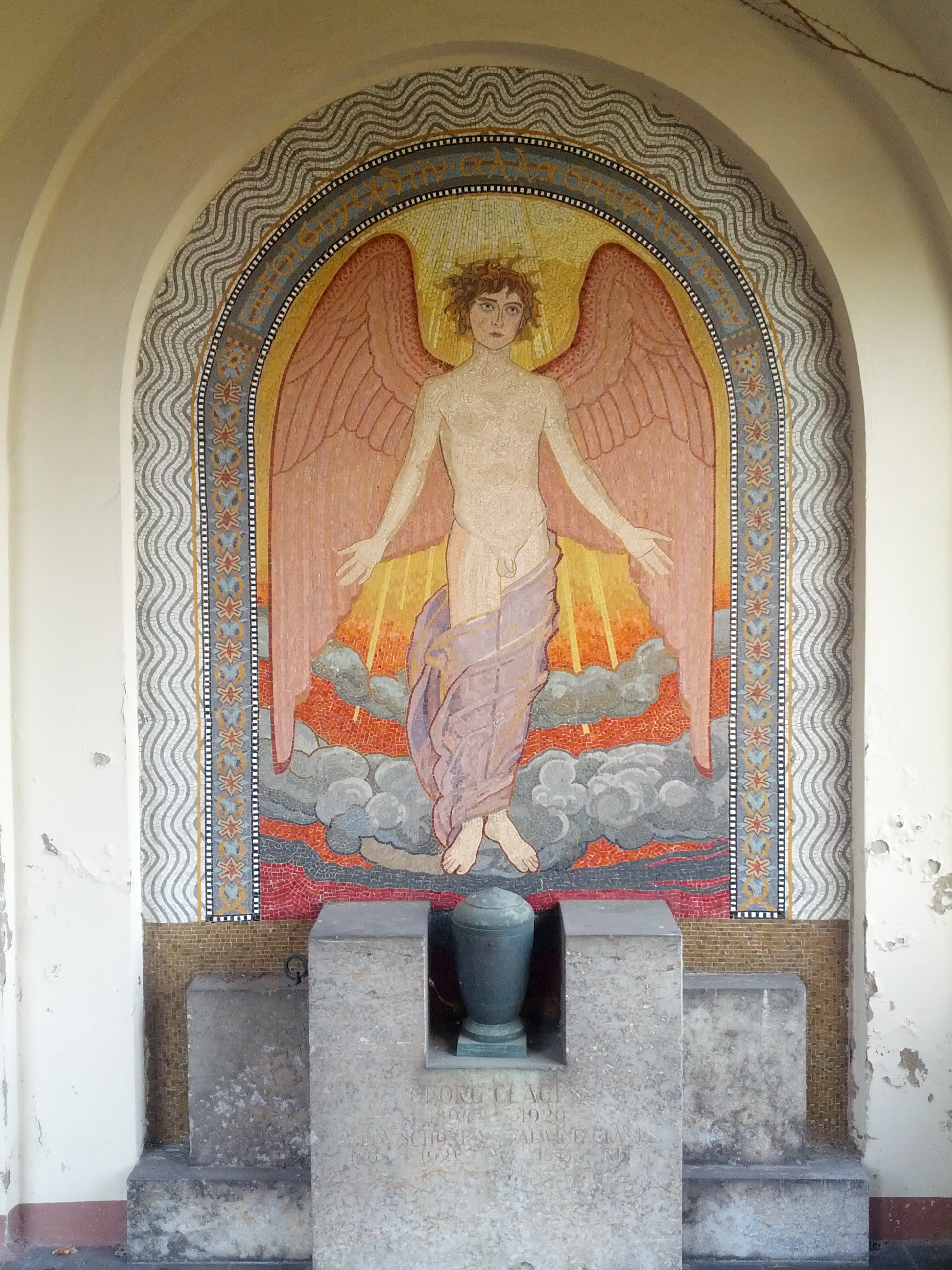
Mosaic at the gravesite of Georg Clages (1894–1920), Urnenhain Tolkewitz, Dresden

== Literature ==
- Hans-Gerd Röder: Sascha Schneider - ein Maler für Karl May. Karl-May-Verlag. Bamberg 1995. 3-7802-0280-8.
- Rolf Günther / Dr. Klaus Hoffmann: Sascha Schneider & Karl May — Eine Künstlerfreundschaft. Karl-May-Stiftung. Radebeul 1989.
- Hansotto Hatzig: Karl May und Sascha Schneider. Dokumente einer Freundschaft. "Beiträge zur Karl-May-Forschung". Edition 2. Bamberg 1967.
- Annelotte Range: Zwischen Max Klinger und Karl May. Karl-May-Verlag. Bamberg 1999. 3-7802-3007-0.
- Felix Zimmermann: Sascha Schneider. Verlag der Schönheit. Dresden 1924.
- Sascha Schneider: Titelzeichnungen zu den Werken Karl Mays. Verlag von Friedrich Ernst Fehsenfeld. Freiburg. 1905.
- Kristopher Brownlow: The Provocative Art Of Sascha Schneider, Mountbatten Press, Oxford etc. 2024, ISBN 9798341358980
