= Leon Pohle =

German painter

Friedrich Leon Pohle
- Born: 1 December 1841; Leipzig, Germany
- Died: 27 February 1908 (aged 66); Dresden
- Education: Dresden Academy of Fine Arts, Weimar Saxon-Grand Ducal Art School
- Known for: Portraits, History Painting
- Awards: Several gold medals at local exhibitions
- Memorials: Leon-Pohle-Straße named after him in Dresden

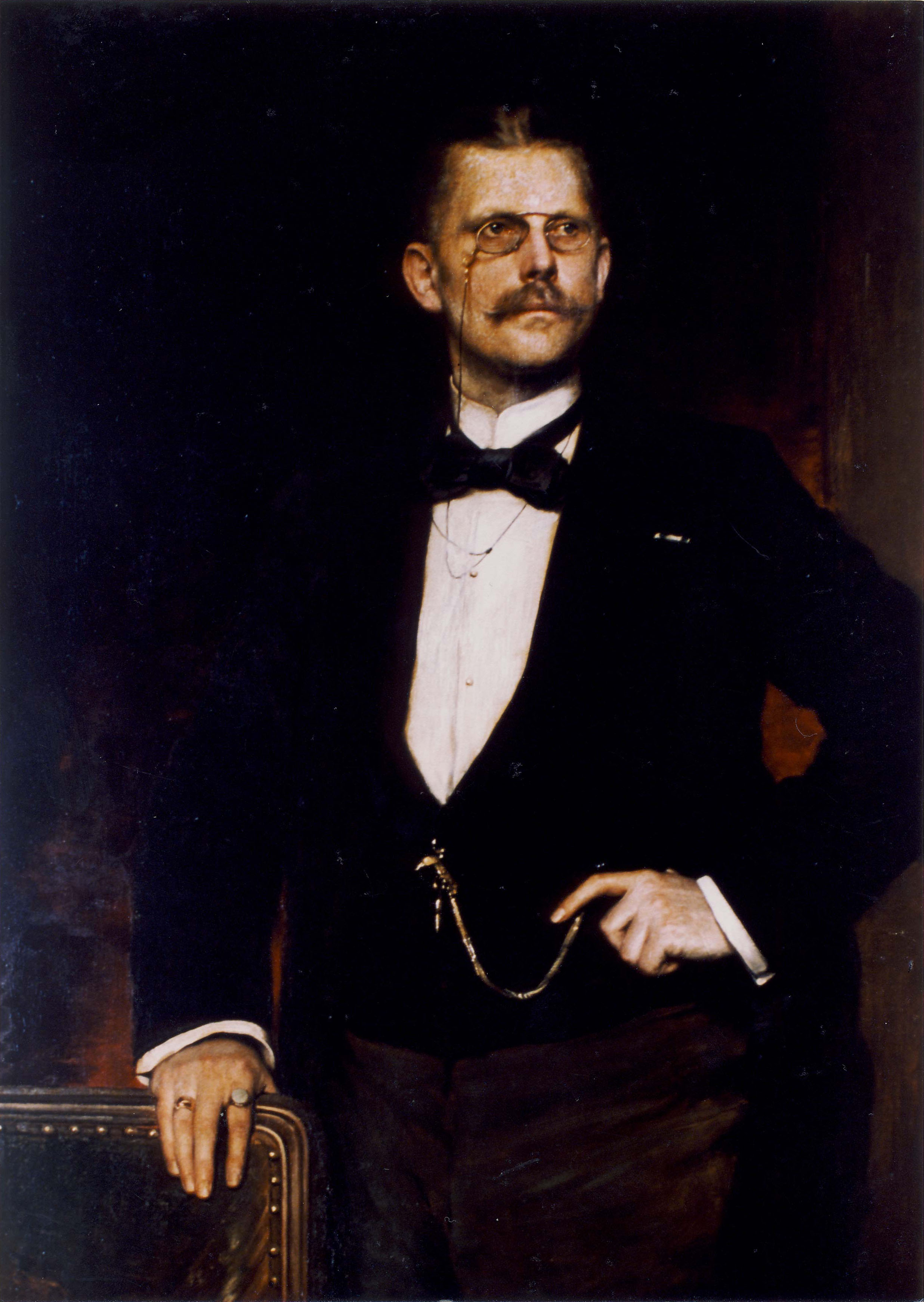
Portrait of Heinrich Gustav von Beck (1854-1933), Oberbürgermeister of Chemnitz

Friedrich Leon Pohle (1 December 1841, Leipzig – 27 February 1908, Dresden) was a German painter. He is mostly known for his portraits.

== Life and work ==
Pohle began attending the Dresden Academy of Fine Arts when he was only fifteen years old. In 1860, he became a student of Jozef Van Lerius in Antwerp. After returning to Germany he went to Weimar, where he studied under Ferdinand Pauwels at the Weimar Saxon-Grand Ducal Art School. In 1866, he returned to his home town, although he went on several study trips. He settled down as a free-lance painter in Weimar in 1868.

Pohle's early work tended to be genre pieces and rather derivative. He later developed his own style in the field of history painting. He became a teacher at the Dresden Academy in 1877 and, later, a Professor. It was there that he made his name as a portraitist. Among his best known portraits are those of his fellow artists Ludwig Richter, Carl Gottlieb Peschel and Ernst Hähnel. He won several gold medals at local exhibitions. Osmar Schindler was one of his students.

A street in Dresden has been named the "Leon-Pohle-Straße" in his honor.
