= Loschwitz Cemetery =

Cemetery in Dresden, Germany

Coordinates: 51.046°N 13.822°E

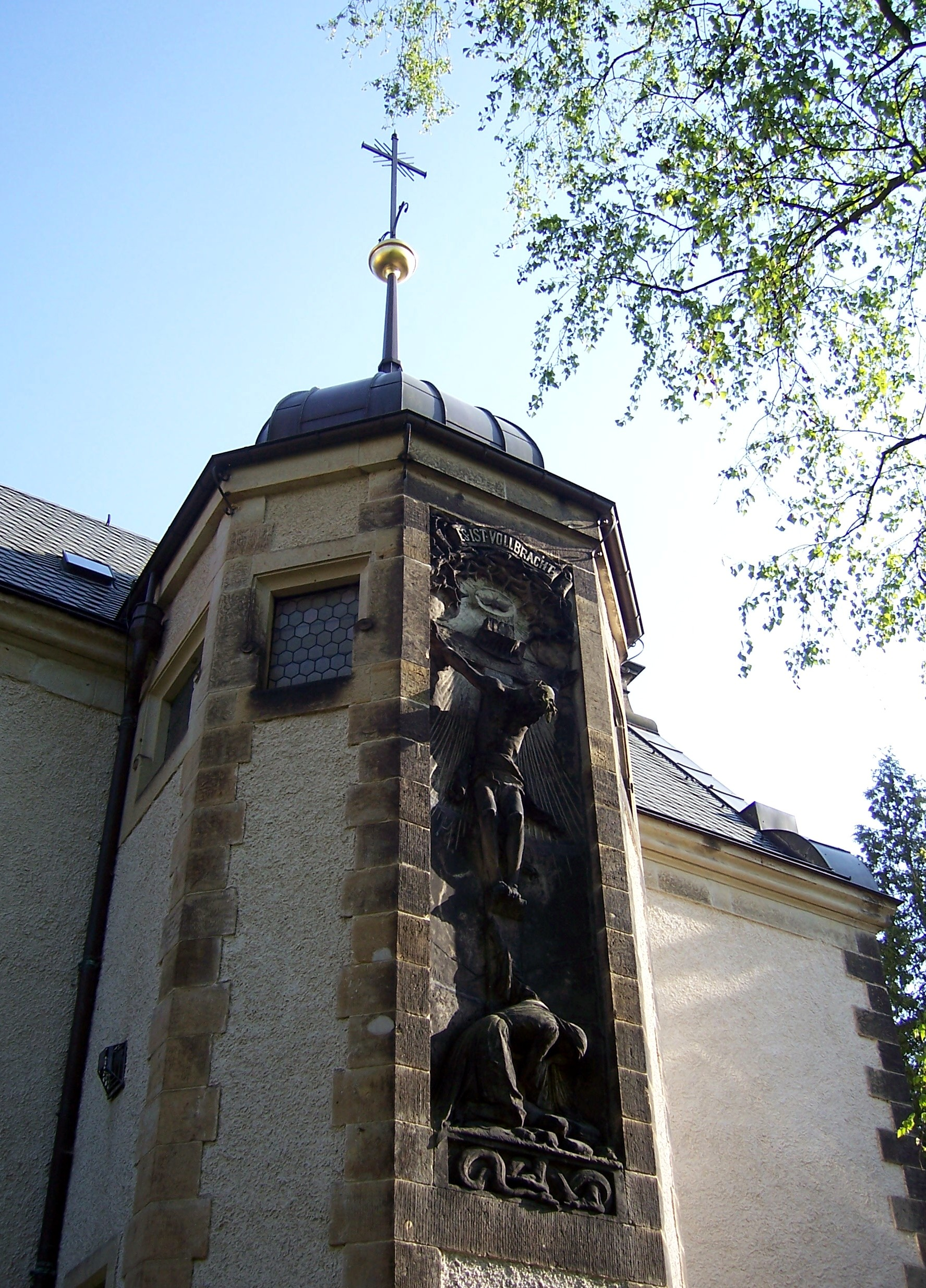
"Crucifixion" by Johannes Hartmann in the Loschwitz Cemetery chapel

Loschwitz Cemetery (German: Loschwitzer Friedhof) is the second burial ground, still in use, of Loschwitz, part of the city of Dresden, Germany, replacing the graveyard of Loschwitz church, no longer used for burials. The cemetery was dedicated in about 1800. Because of the many artists buried here and the many artistically valuable funerary sculptures it is a protected monument.

== History ==
In about 1800 the churchyard of Loschwitz became full, and so a new burial ground was opened on the road to Pillnitz, the present cemetery. It is laid out as a meadow. Over the years it has been enlarged several times in the direction of the old village centre of Loschwitz. It consists today of an old part and a new part, opened in 1918, and a place for urn burials, completed in 1927.

In 1893 a chapel was added, by the architect Friedrich Reuter. The stained glass windows are by Wilhelm Walther, the creator of the Dresden "Fürstenzug"; the scene of the Crucifixion over the centre portal is by the sculptor Johannes Hartmann from Leipzig. The chapel bell with an inscription "Frieden" ("Peace") was made in 1947 by Friedrich Wilhelm Schilling from Apolda. During the flooding of the Elbe in 2002 the cemetery was under water, which damaged the many trees and plants. The damage was made good by volunteers.

== Graves ==
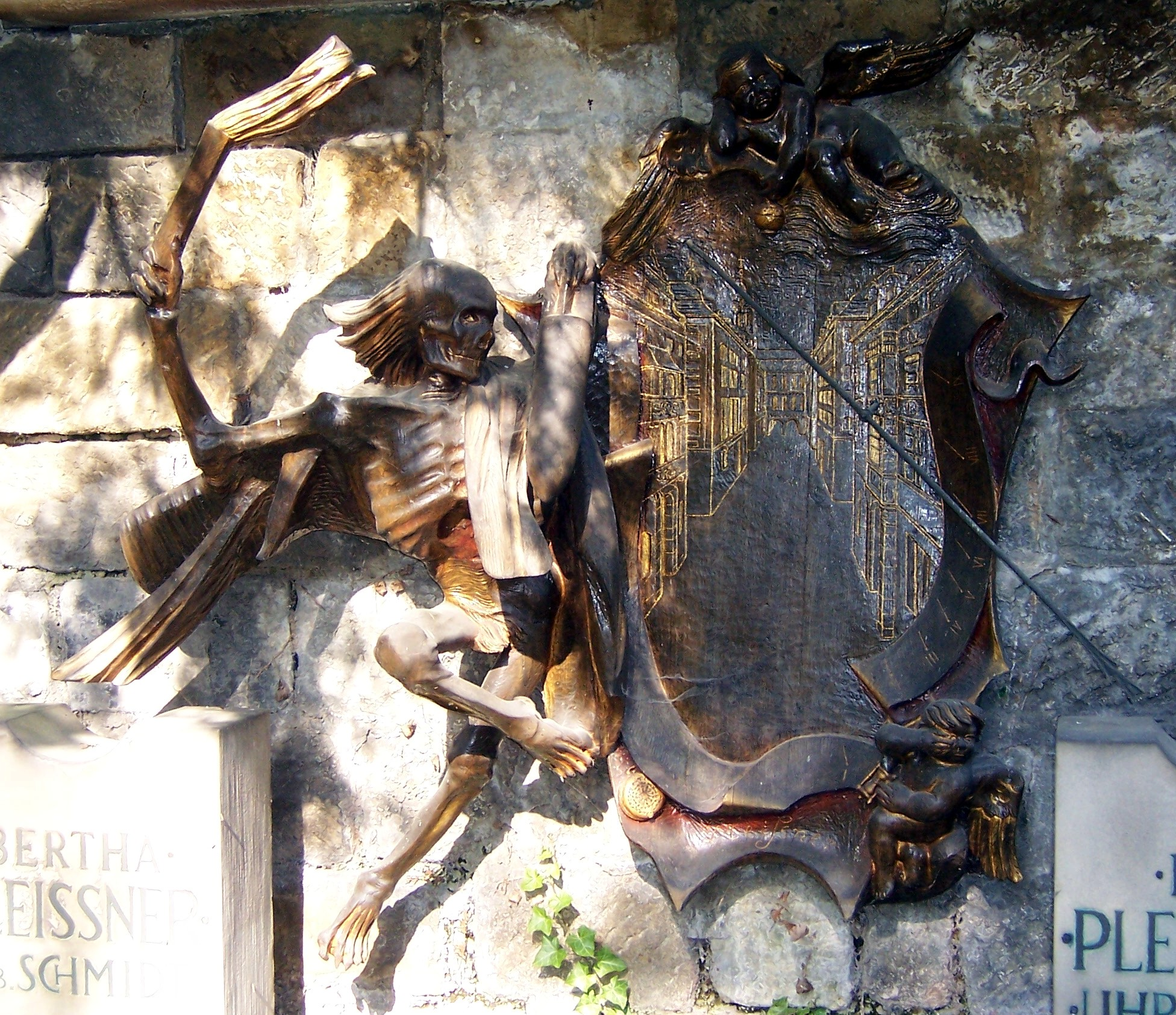
Tod mit Bombe ("Death with Bomb") by Friedrich Press: sculpture on the grave of the watchmaker Paul Pleißner

Loschwitz Cemetery is the burial place of numerous artists of regional and national significance, who also created many of the gravestones and monuments. Many of them lived, at least for a time, in the Loschwitz Artists' House, which stands directly opposite the cemetery. More than 60 of the graves are counted as being of special artistic significance, including the following:

- Walter Arnold – made his own grave sculpture "Es gibt kein fremdes Leid" ("There is no strange hurt")
- Hermann Glöckner – gravestone by Peter Makolies
- Josef Hegenbarth – grave to Hegenbarth's design
- Hans Jüchser – gravestone by Friedrich Press
- Eduard Leonhardi – grave sculpture "Anklopfender Pilger" ("Knocking Pilgrim") by Robert Henze
- Friedrich Press – made his own grave sculpture
- Hans Theo Richter – grave sculpture by Friedrich Press
- Sascha Schneider – bust by Paul Peterich
- Willy Wolff and Annemarie Balden-Wolff – sculpture by Willy Wolff
- Oskar Zwintscher – grave sculpture "Jüngling mit gesenkter Fackel" ("Youth with Lowered Torch") by Sascha Schneider
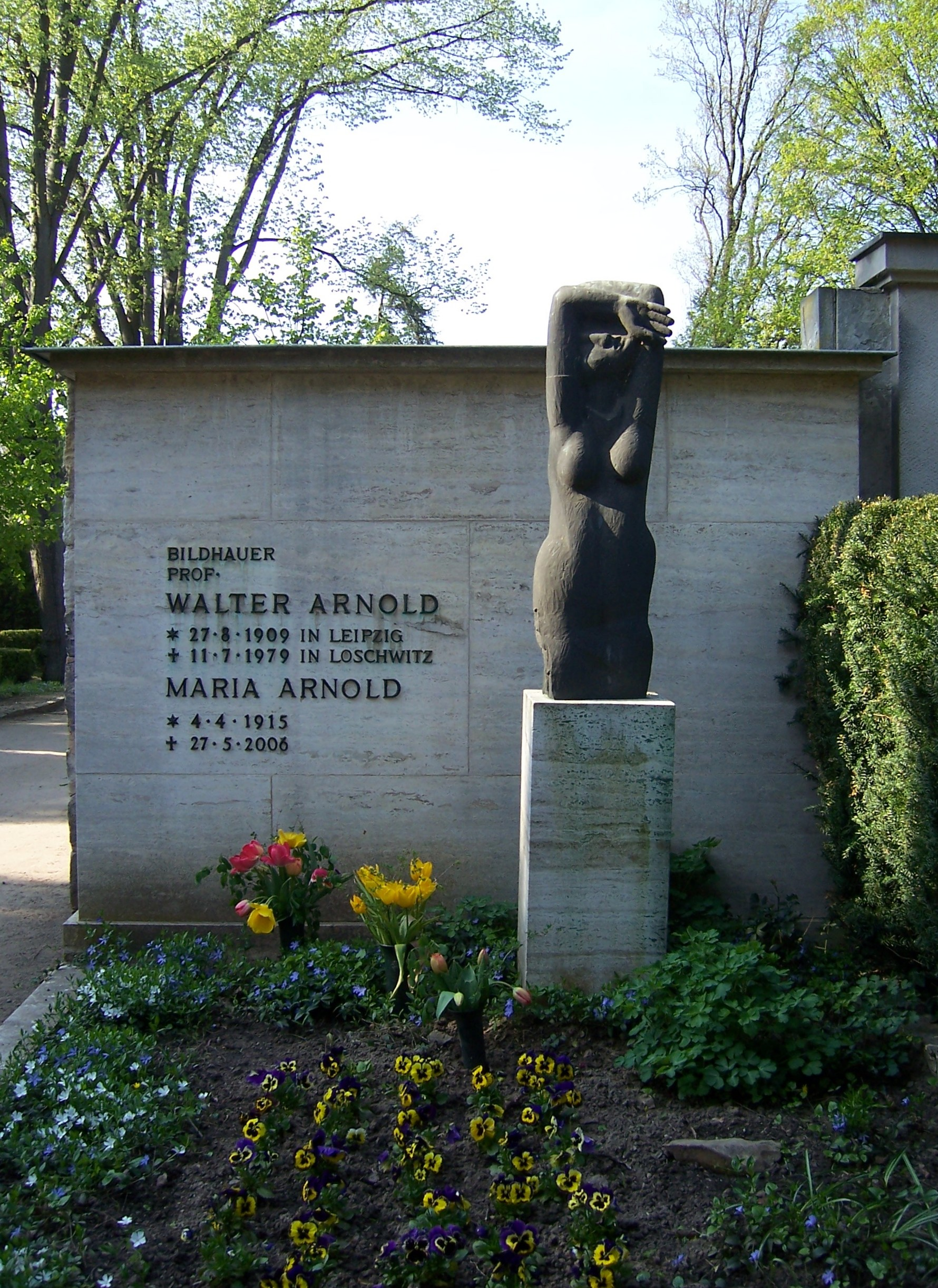
Grave of Walter Arnold

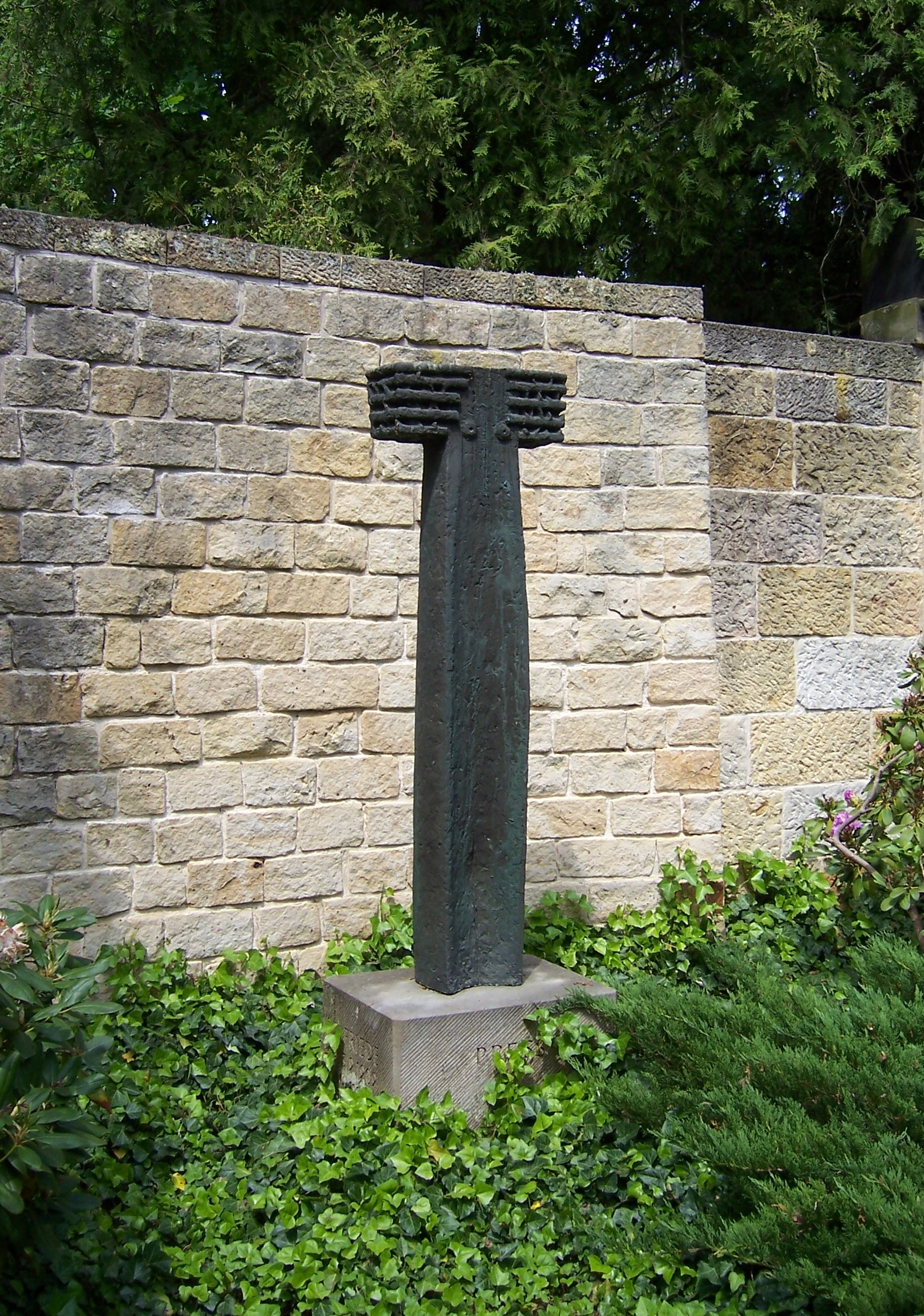
Grave of Friedrich Press

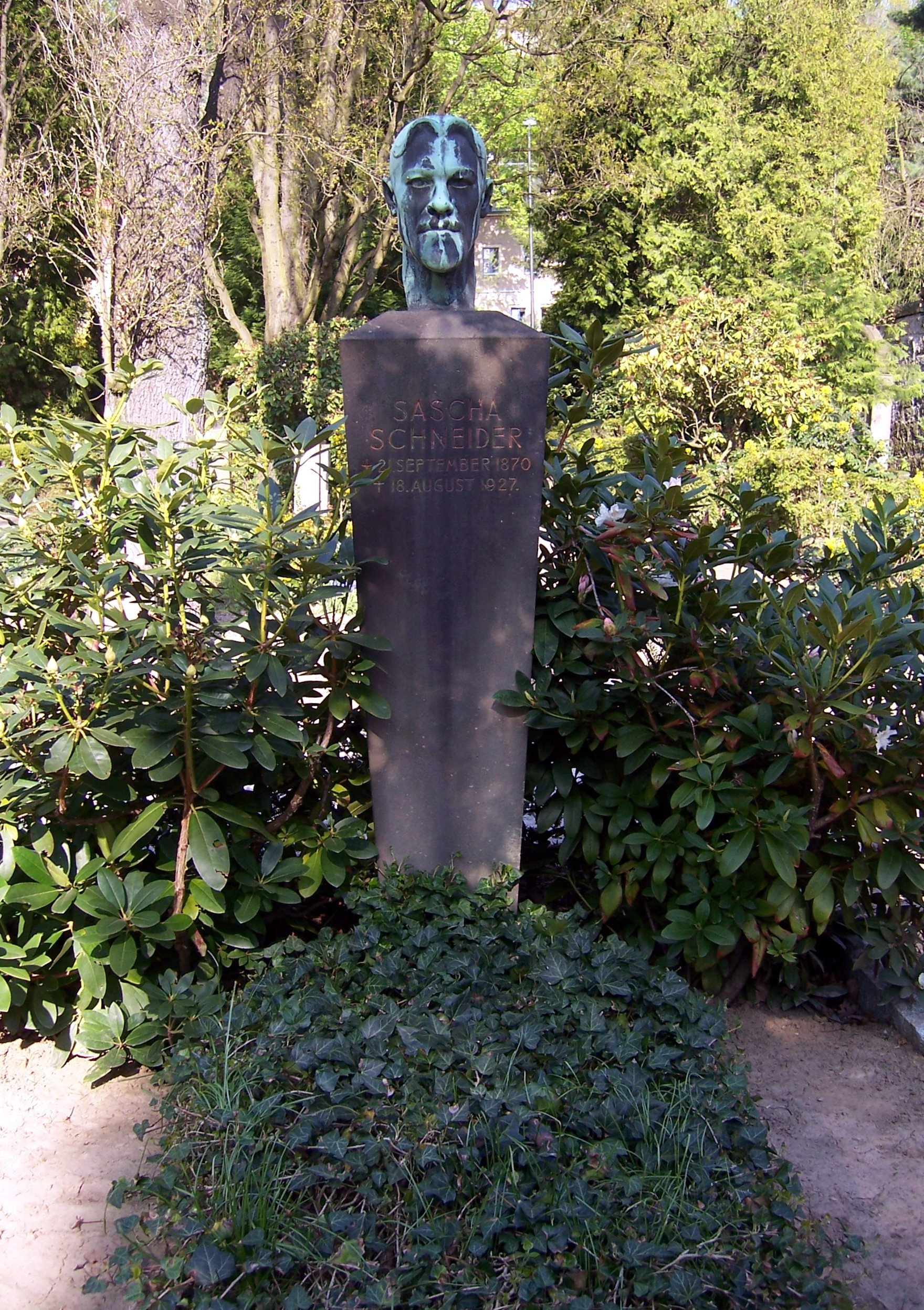
Grave of Sascha Schneider

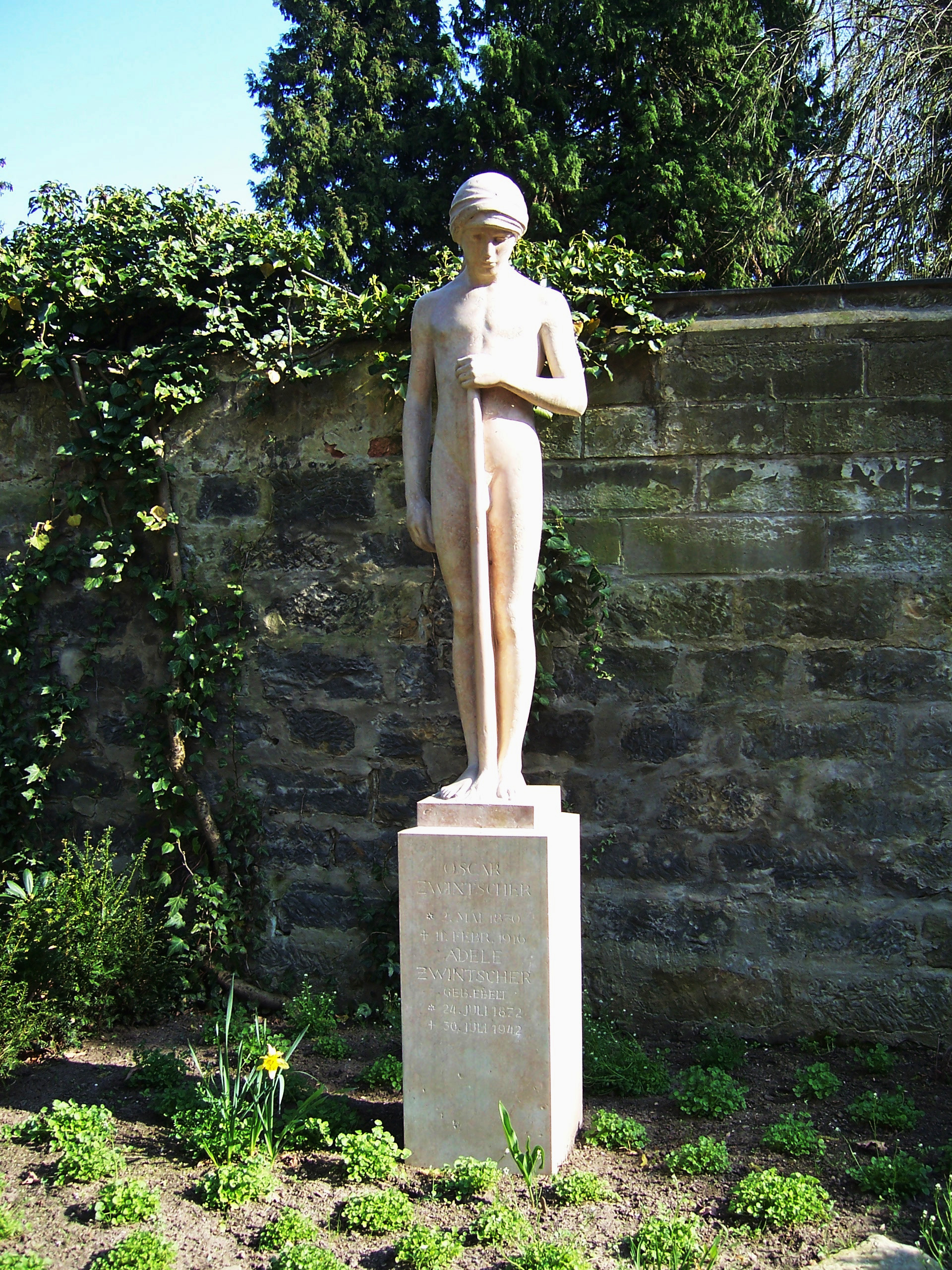
Grave of Oskar Zwintscher

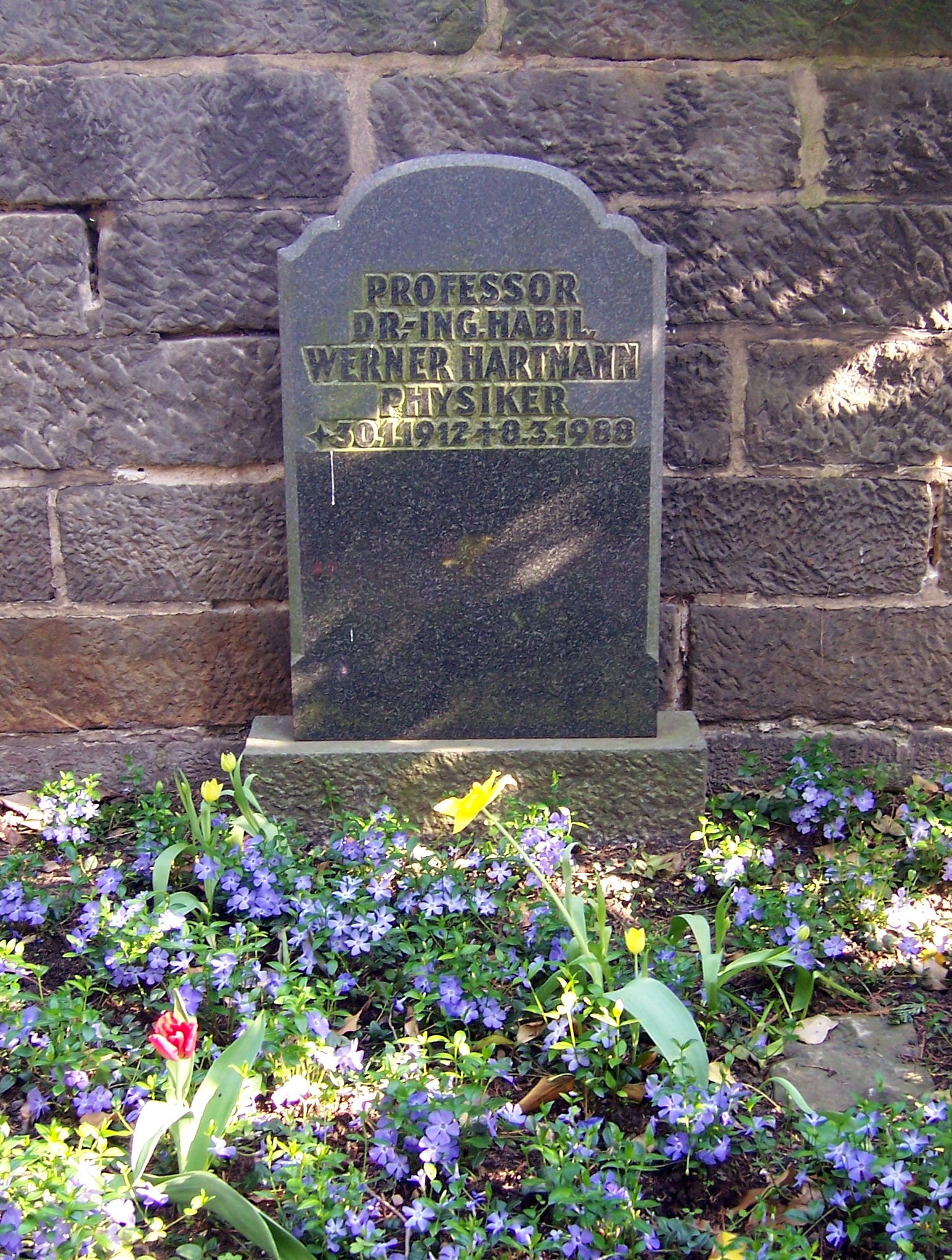
Grave of Werner Hartmann

Other artistically valuable graves are those of Wilhelm Lachnit and Hans Unger. The imposing monumental sculpture "Tod mit Bombe" ("Death with Bomb"), designed by Friedrich Press in 1945 for the watchmaker Paul Pleißner, shows Death carrying a bomb and a scythe. Pleißner lost his business in the air raids on Dresden, and the monument is also seen today as a memorial to the victims of the Dresden bombing.

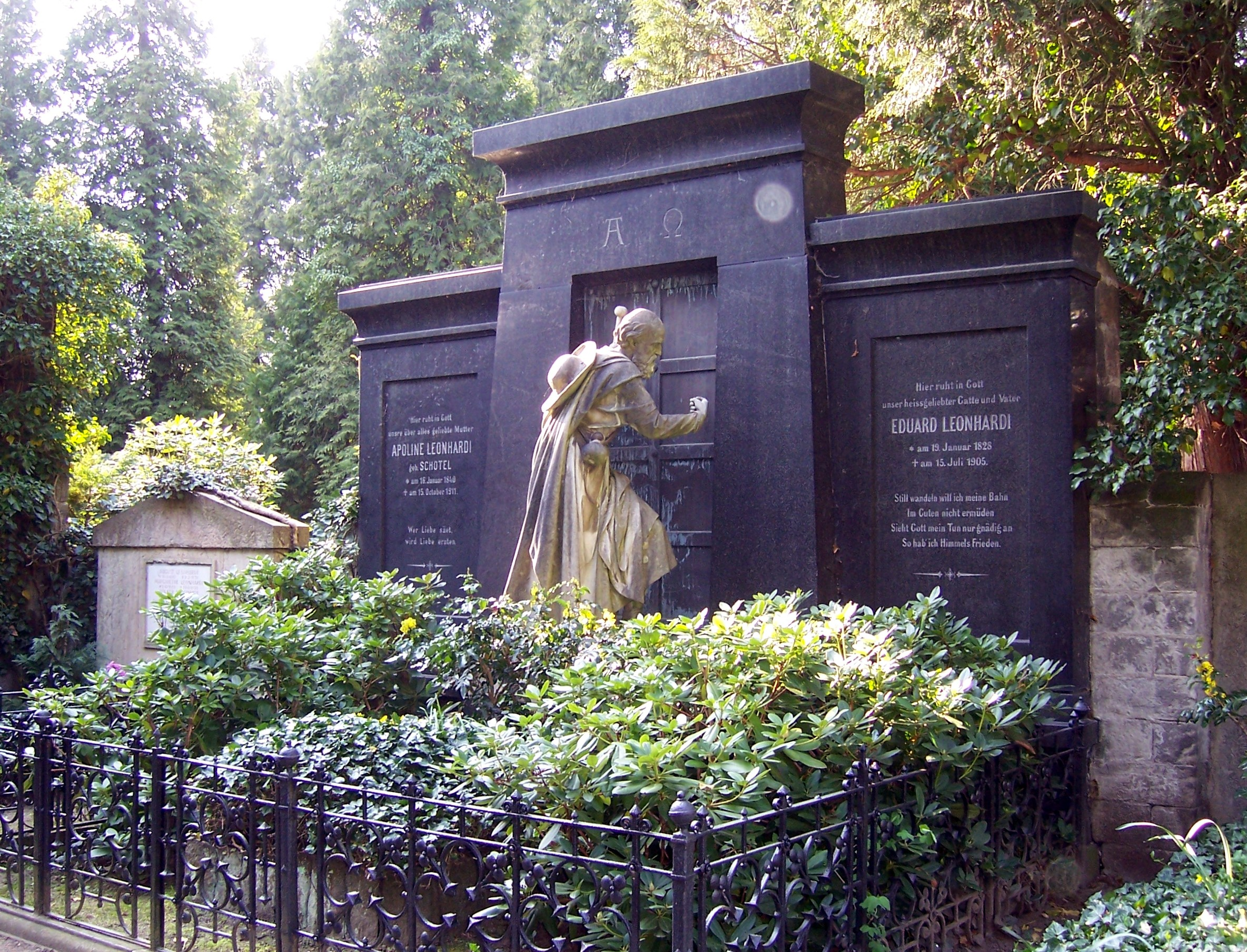
Grave of Eduard Leonhardi with sculpture by Robert Henze Anklopfender Pilger ("Knocking Pilgrim")

Others buried in the cemetery include:

- Georg Aster, architect
- Kurt Beyer, structural engineer
- Artur Brabant, archivist
- Rolf Engert, author and publisher
- Otto Griebel, painter and puppeteer
- Werner Hartmann, physicist
- Ernst Hassebrauk, painter
- Jürgen Haufe, painter and graphic artist
- Joachim Heuer (1900–1994), painter
- Bruno Konrad, painter
- August Kotzsch, photographer
- Karl Kröner, painter
- Erna Lincke, painter
- Kurt Martens, writer
- Richard Müller, painter and graphic artist
- Martin Pietzsch, architect
- Egon Pukall, painter and graphic artist
- Hilde Rakebrand (1901–1991), painter
- Irena Rüther-Rabinowicz, painter
- Gustav Rumpel, architect
- Osmar Schindler, painter
- Edmund Schuchardt, architect and draughtsman
- Kurt Schütze, painter
- Curt Siegel, sculptor (grave removed)
- Inge Thiess-Böttner, painter and graphic artist
- Erich Trefftz, mathematician
- Otto Westphal, painter

There are also two war memorials. The one commemorating the dead of World War I was dedicated in 1923. Since 1956 three wooden crosses to a design by Oskar Menzel have commemorated the dead of World War II.

== Literature ==
- Dubbers, Annette (ed.), 2003: Loschwitz, p. 19. Dresden: self-published
- Rühl, Barbara, 2004: Zur Geschichte des Loschwitzer Friedhofes. In: Ev.-Luth-Kirchgemeinde Dresden-Loschwitz (ed.): 300 Jahre Kirchgemeinde Dresden-Loschwitz. Festschrift, pp. 102–106. Dresden: self-published
- Stein, Marion, 2000: Friedhöfe in Dresden, p. 168. Dresden: Verlag der Kunst
