= Friedrich Preller =

Friedrich Preller may refer to one of two German painters:

- Friedrich Preller the Elder (1804–1878), landscape painter, etcher and professor
- Friedrich Preller the Younger (1838–1901), landscape and marine painter
