= Preller =

Preller is a surname that is likely derived in the Middle Ages from the German word 'prellen,' which means 'to bounce' or 'to strike.' This suggests that the name may have been given as an occupational surname to a blacksmith or bladesmith. It may also derived from Middle High German 'brellen' meaning to 'shout' or 'roar' and therefore may indicate another occupational surname of town crier. Notable people with the surname include:

- A. J. Preller (born 1977), former MLB scout and the current GM of San Diego Padres
- Alexis Preller (1911-1975) South African painter
- Fred W. Preller (1902–1974), New York assemblyman
- Friedrich Preller the Elder (1804–1878), German landscape painter
- Friedrich Preller the Younger (1838–1903), German painter
- Gustav Preller (1875–1943), South African journalist and historian
- James Preller (1961–), American author
- Johann Gottlieb Preller (1727–1786), German composer
- Ludwig Preller (1809–1861), German philologist and antiquarian
