= Eduard Leonhardi =

German artist

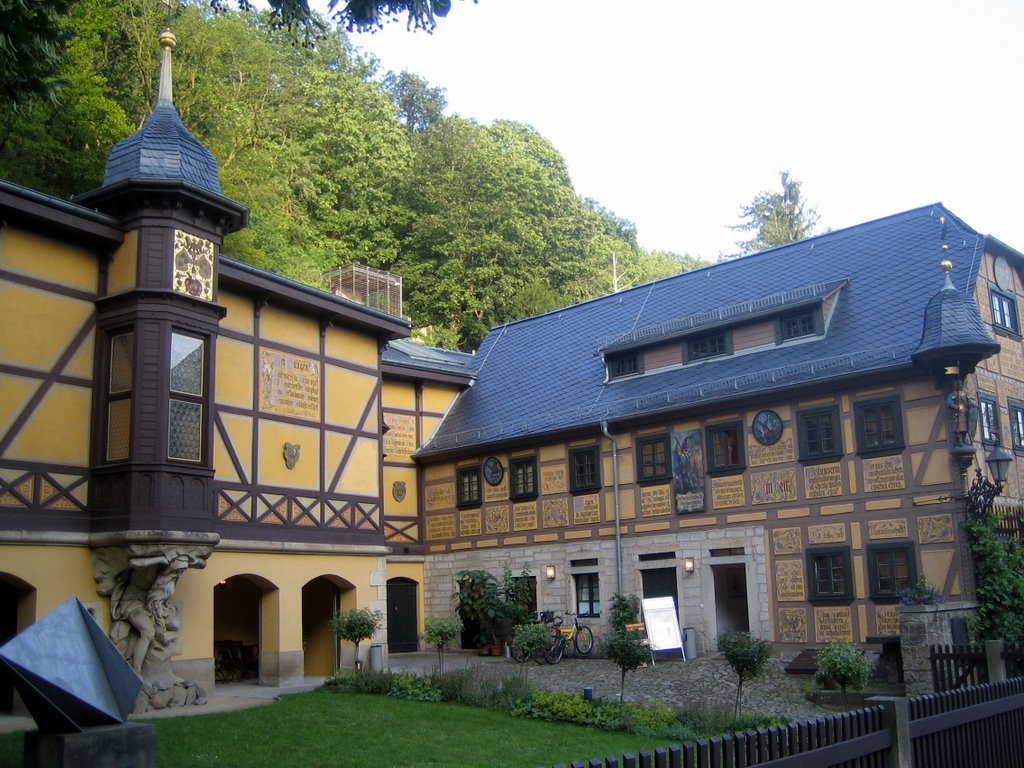
Leonhardi Museum

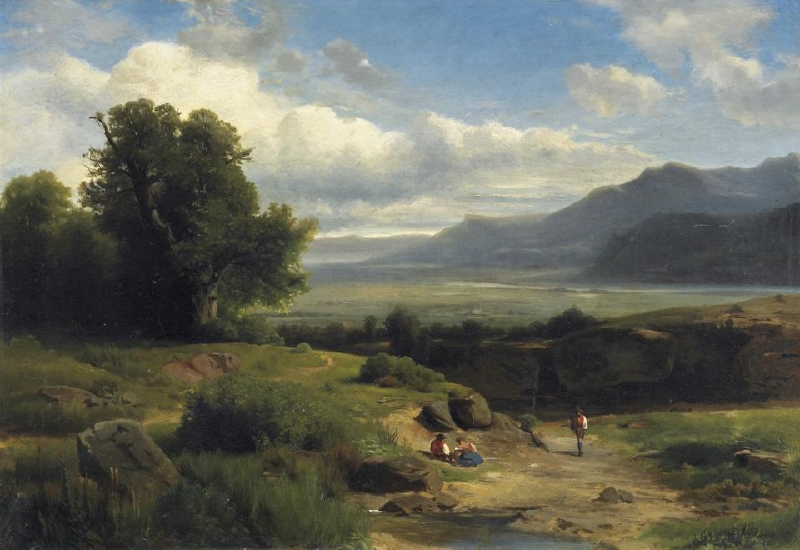
Blick in das weite Elbtal, 1866

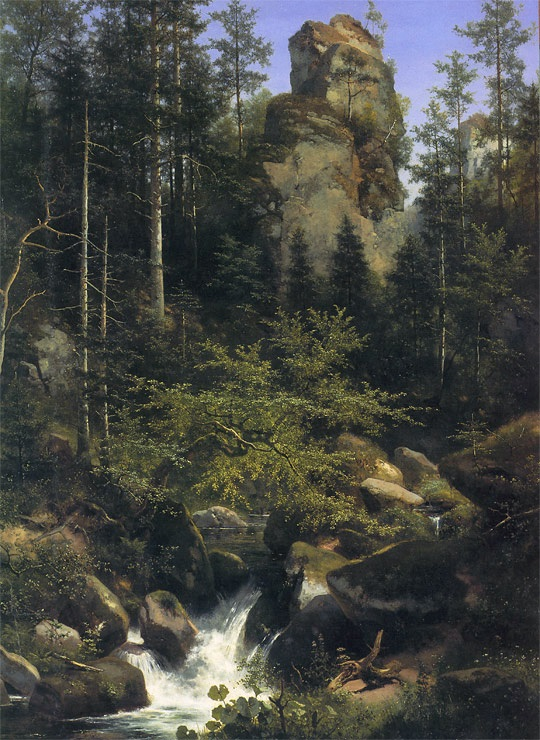
Stürzender Waldbach, 1880

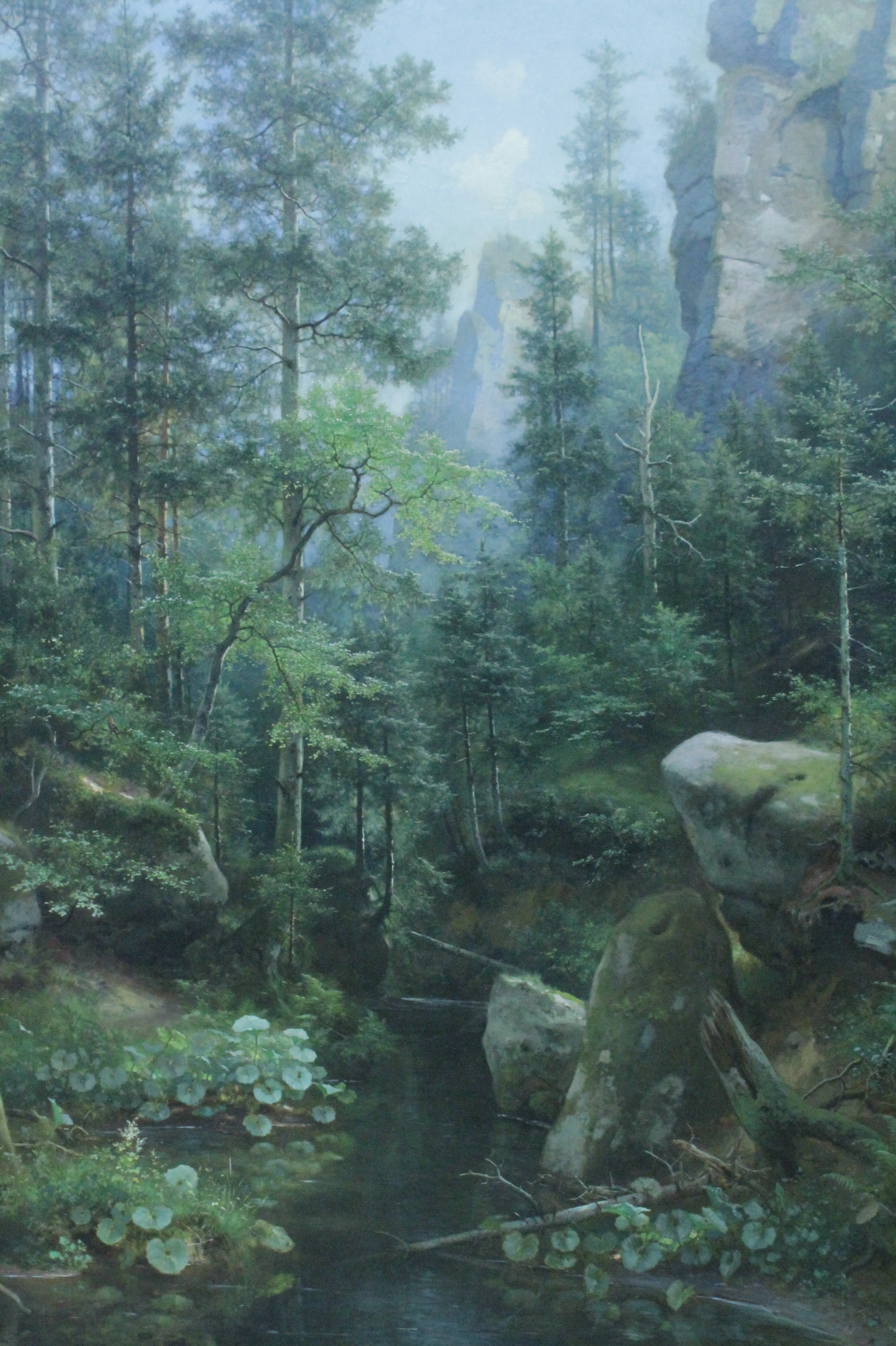
Forest Solitude 1879 by Eduard Leonhardi, Albertinum, Dresden

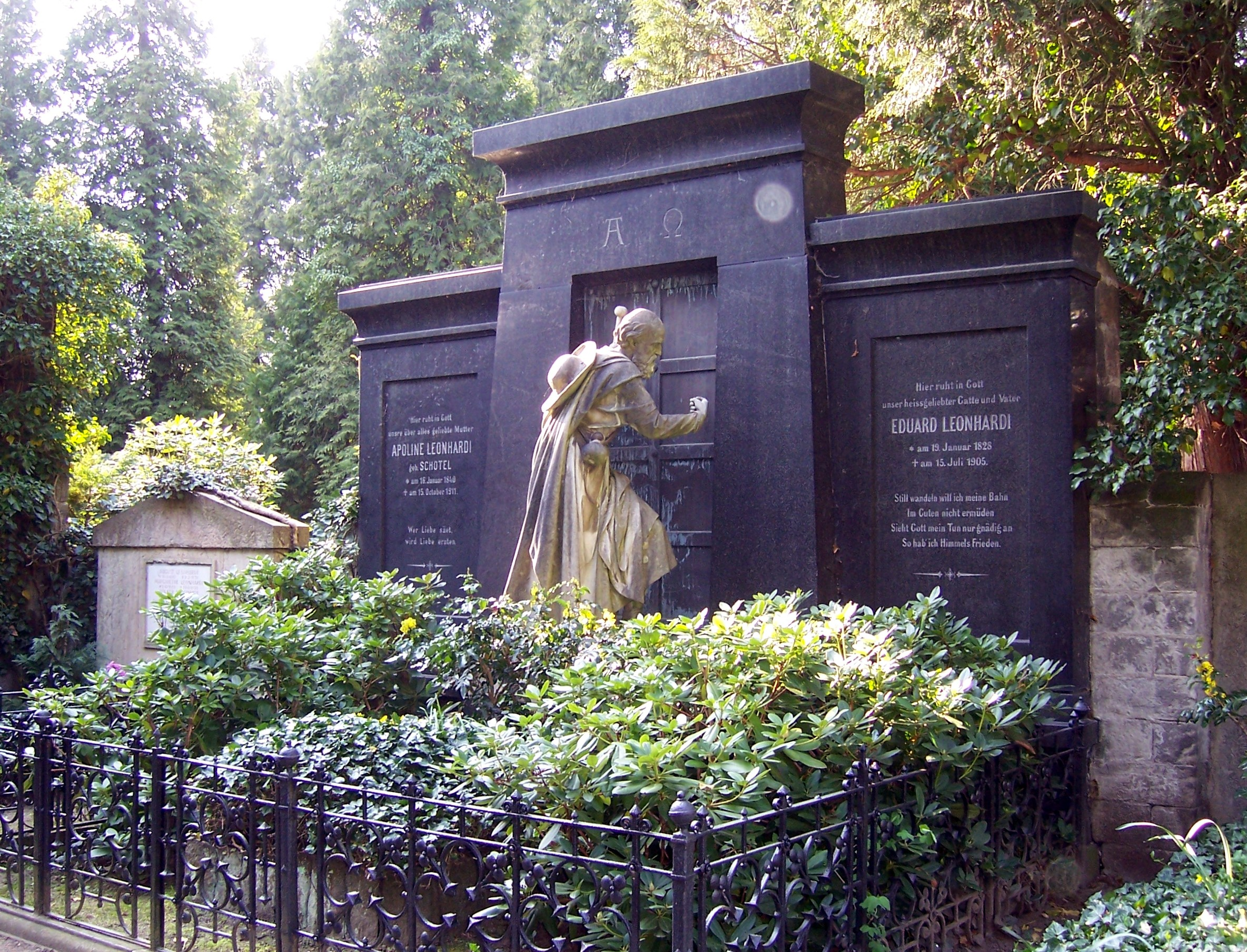
The grave of Eduard Leonhardis at Loschwitz Cemetery

Eduard Leonhardi (1828–1905) was a 19th-century German artist especially remembered for his paintings of forest interiors and wilderness in the Romantic style. He is known as The Painter of the German Forest.

== Life ==
He was born in Freiberg in Saxony on 19 January 1828. His father, August Leonhardi (1805–1865) moved to Dresden and became a wealthy ink manufacturer.

From 1842 to 1845 he studied at the Dresden Academy of Art under Ludwig Richter. He worked briefly in Düsseldorf before returning to Dresden in 1859 and settling in the Loschwitz area where he remained for the rest of his life. In 1879 he bought an old mill on Grundstrasse, a twisting and steeply climbing connection from the River Elbe to the high ridge above.

In 1884 he erected a monument to his mentor, Ludwig Richter, at the mill.

He died at home in the Loschwitz district in north-east Dresden. He is buried in the Loschwitz Cemetery. The statue on the grave is by Robert Henze.

His house is now the Leonhardi Museum.

== Family ==
He was married to Apoline Schotel (1840–1911).

== Works ==
Almost all of the major German city galleries hold examples of Leonhardi's work.
