= Edmund Schuchardt =

German architect (1889–1972)

- Born: January 27, 1889
- Died: September 10, 1972 (aged 83)

Edmund Schuchardt (January 27, 1889 – September 10, 1972) was a German architect and interior designer in Dresden who was persecuted by the Nazis.

== Biography ==
Schuchardt was born on January 27, 1889, in Leuben. Around 1910, he attended evening school at the Dresden School of Applied Arts together with Hermann Glöckner.

From 1912 to 1917, Schuchardt was a master student with William Lossow and Oskar Menzel at the School of Applied Arts, and from 1919 to 1922 he was a student at the Dresden Academy of Fine Arts with Heinrich Tessenow and Hans Poelzig.

After 1930, he and his Jewish wife Fanny (née Dubliner) moved into an apartment in the Dürerbundhaus in Dresden-Blasewitz, where they shared a floor with the family of brother-in-law Kurt Fiedler. At that time, the office of the Kunstwart and Dürerbund was still in the house. Schuchardt was last recorded as an architect with this address in the 1943/44 address book. The Dürerbundhaus was destroyed during the Bombing of Dresden on February 13, 1945 .

Because Schuchardt did not divorce his Jewish wife, the Nazis banned him from working and deported him to forced labor on November 9, 1944, in the Osterode mine, from which he was liberated by the American army. After the Second World War, the Schuchardt couple were recognized as victims of fascism (OdF).

In 1946, Schuchardt was represented at the Saxon Artists art exhibition. In 1948, he became Professor at the Hochschule für Werkkunst Dresden, the successor to the School of Applied Arts. Three years after the merger with the Academy of Fine Arts to form the Dresden University of Fine Arts (HfBK) in 1950, Schuchardt resigned from teaching. He died on September 10, 1972, in Wachwitz. Schuchardt and his wife were buried at the Loschwitz cemetery.

== Works ==
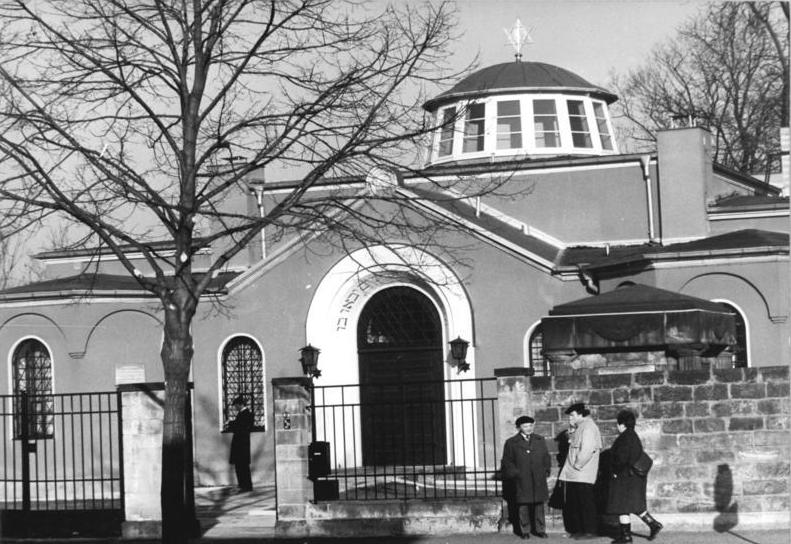
Synagoge in Dresden-Johannstadt

One of Schuchardt's most important areas of work was interior design. He is best known for his involvement in the Dresden-Johannstadt synagogue. He was repeatedly represented at art exhibitions in Dresden with architectural designs and drawings.

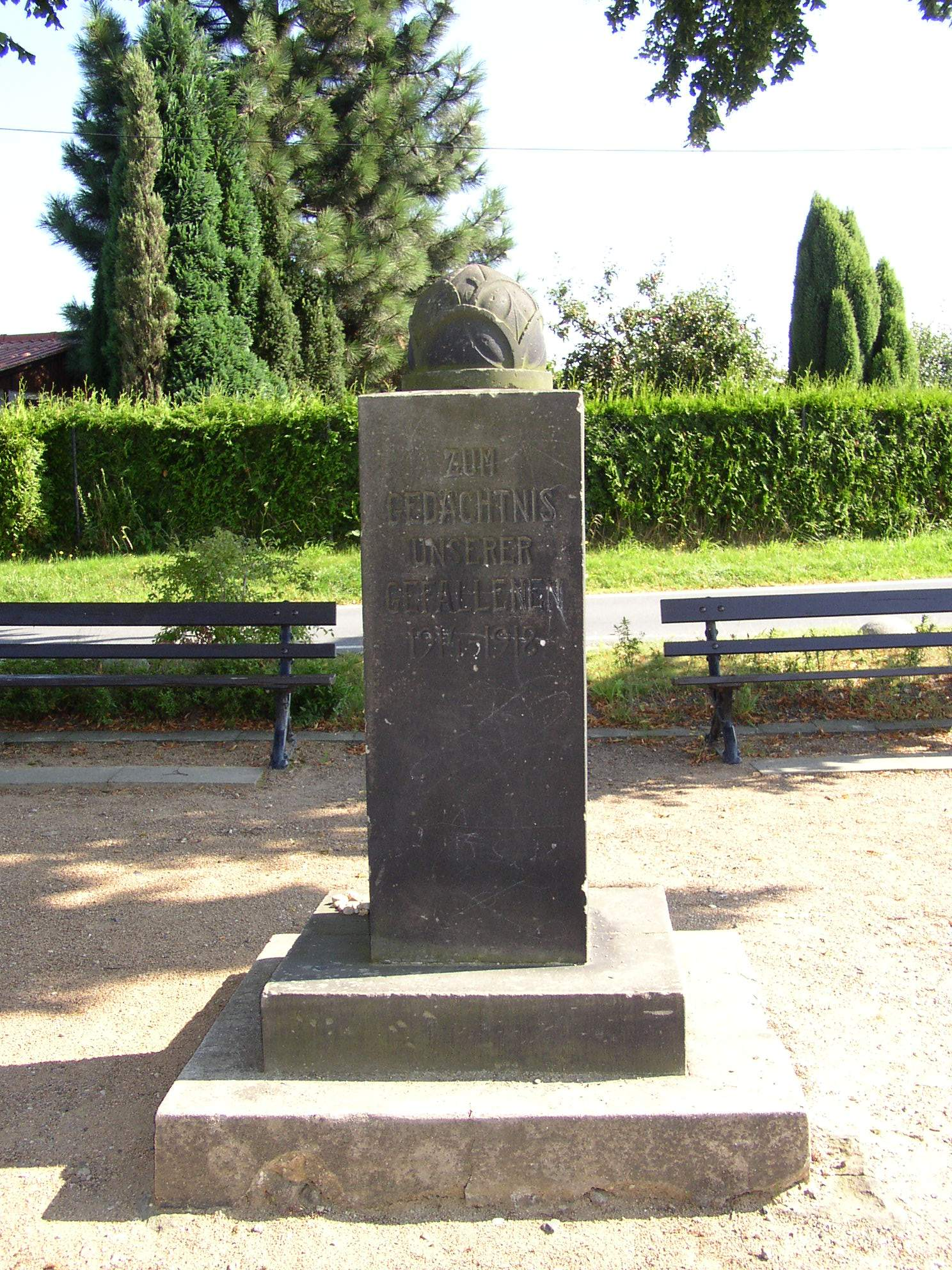
Rockau monument designed by Schuchardt

In Rockau, he created the monument in memory of those who died in the First World War, and in Wachwitz he created the Hottenrothstrasse settlement.
