= Paul Peterich =

German sculptor (1864–1937)

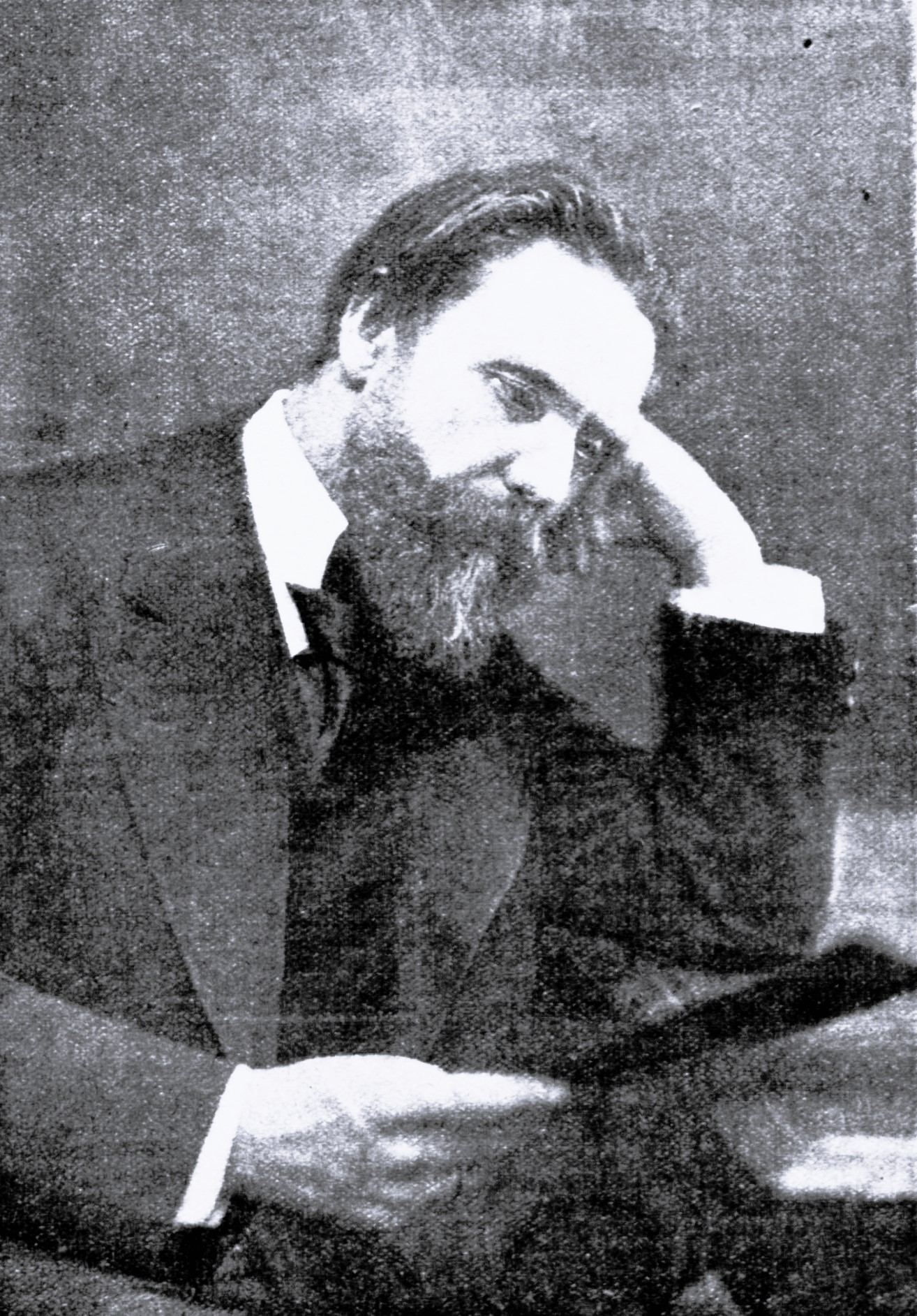
Paul Peterich (1912)

Paul Friedrich Gustav Peterich, born Petersen (1 February 1864, Bad Schwartau - 22 September 1937, Rotterdam) was a German sculptor.

== Life and work ==
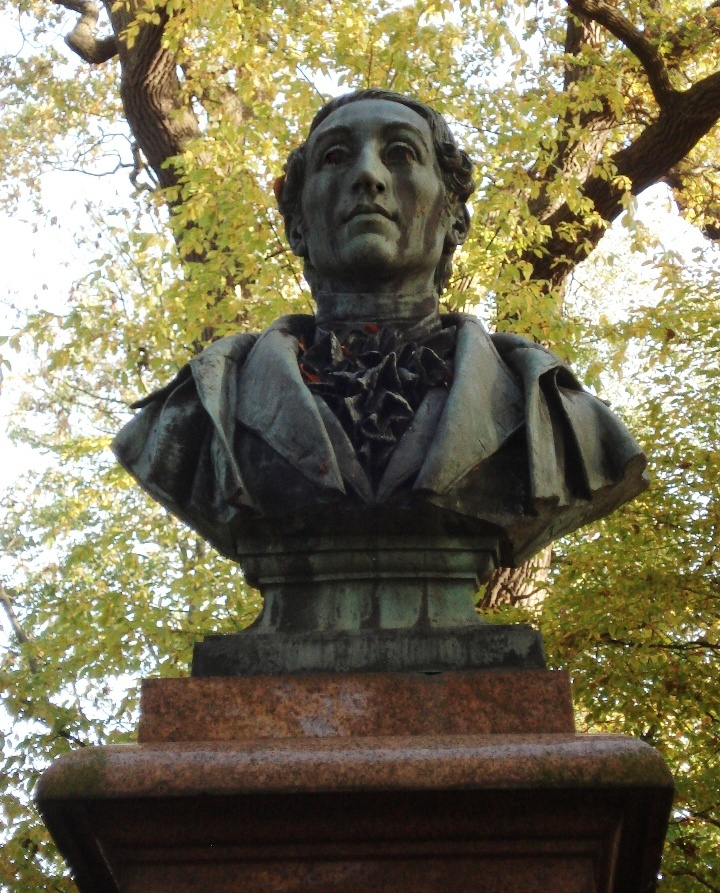
Bust of Carl-Maria von Weber, at his monument in Eutin

His father, Jasper Hinrich Petersen (1833–1920), was originally from Bad Bramstedt and worked as a journeyman turner. When his employer died in 1861, Petersen married his widow, Magdalena Margarete (1829–1905). He eventually became a Master turner, and a member of the City Council. They had three sons. Paul, their second, learned the woodworking trade; including turnery. He later attended the Kunstgewerbeschule in Lübeck, where he was exposed to art for the first time, and was inspired to pursue it further.

In 1884, Peter II, Grand Duke of Oldenburg, an expert on art, saw one of Peterich's student pieces and provided a scholarship that enabled him to attend the Berlin University of the Arts. There, he finished in the master class taught by Fritz Schaper. During his studies, in 1887, he entered a competition to design a monument for the composer Carl Maria von Weber, and won. It was inaugurated in 1890, and launched his career.

His next major commission was a monument to Friedrich von Reventlou] and Wilhelm Beseler, Stadtholders of Schleswig-Holstein during the First Schleswig War. It was inaugurated in 1891, but was melted down during World War II. This was followed by a monument to Matthäus Friedrich Chemnitz and Carl Gottlieb Bellmann, the composers of Wanke nicht, mein Vaterland, Schleswig-Holstein's unofficial national anthem. It was begun in 1894 and inaugurated in 1896. These successes made him known throughout Germany, and financially independent.

In 1899, he married the pianist, Elsbeth Kühn (1876–1935), daughter of the manufacturer, Hermann Kühn. They would have three sons and two daughters, including the writer and publisher, Eckart Peterich. His large income also enabled them to travel extensively. In 1901, they relocated to Munich. There, he became associated with the artists' colony in Schwabing, and exhibited with the Munich Secession. In 1905, Frederick Augustus II, Grand Duke of Oldenburg, gave him the honorary title of Professor.

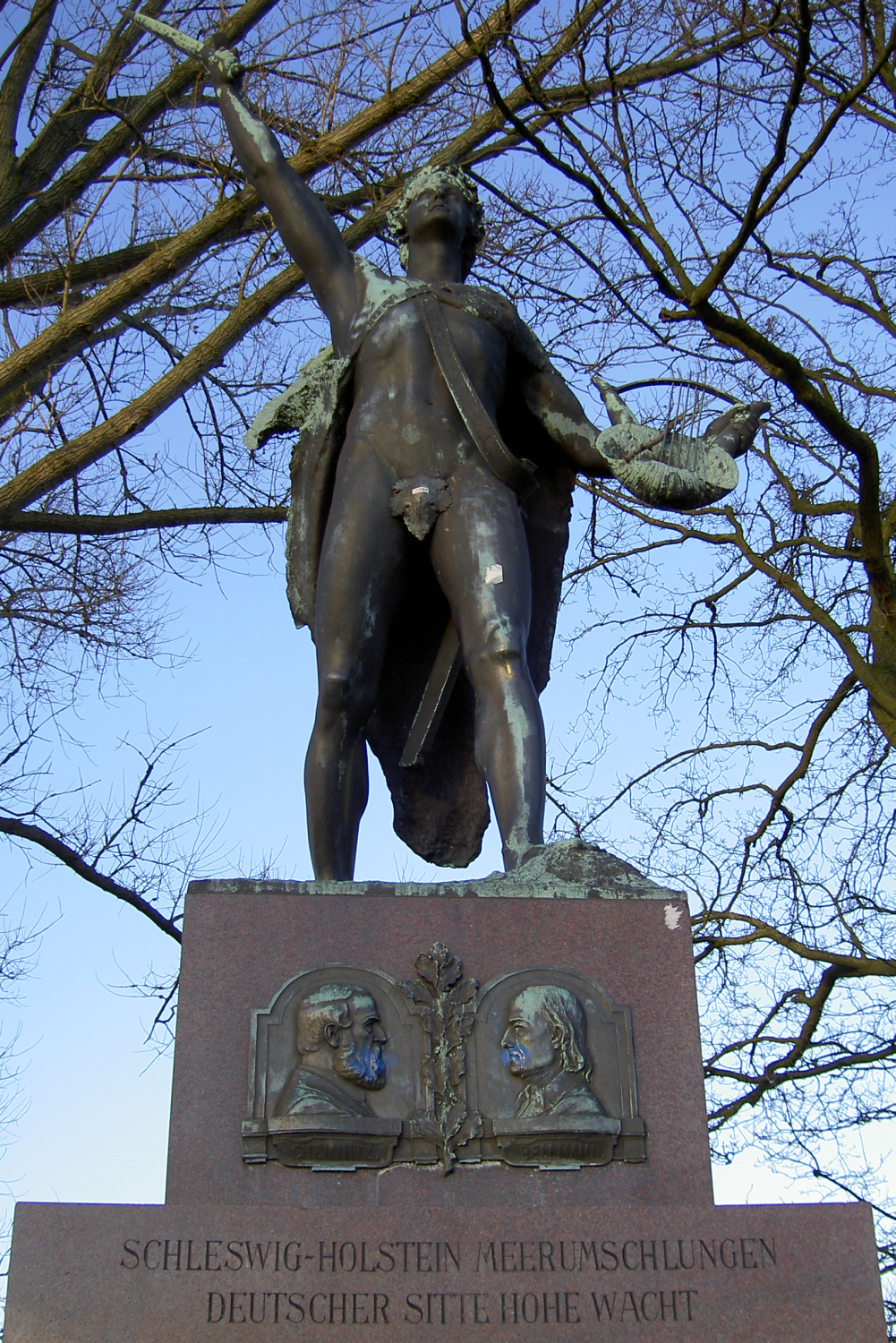
The Bellmann-Chemnitz monument in Schleswig

In 1912, his hometown received its Town Charter. The following year, his father celebrated his 80th birthday. To mark both occasions, he created statues of Triton and the Nereids, which are now landmarks in Bad Schwartau. In 1914, shortly after World War I began, he went to live at the artists' colony in Hellerau, near Dresden. There, he was primarily active as a medallist. He held a maajor showing at the Große Berliner Kunstausstellung in 1920.

He and Elsbeth were legally separated in 1922. After that, he spent much of his time in Capri then, from 1927, in Florence. In 1934, following the Nazi takeover in Germany, he moved to the Netherlands and settled in The Hague. Later, he relocated to Rotterdam, where he died in 1937, aged seventy-three. Several of his larger works were melted down during the war, and many of the smaller ones are unaccounted for.
