= Karl Kröner =

German painter

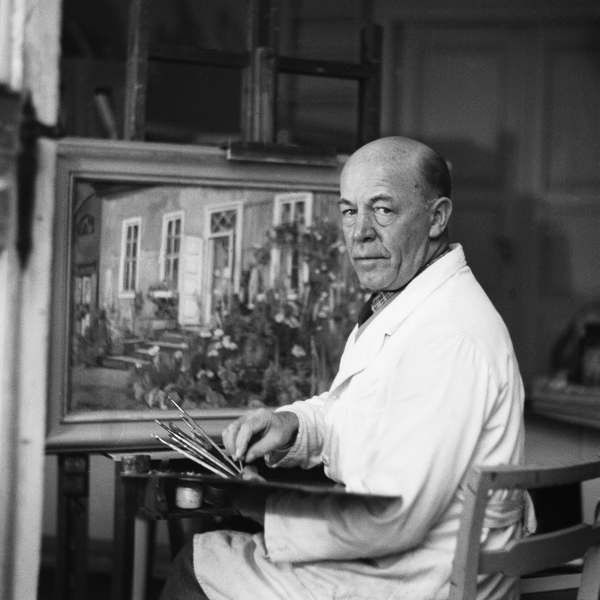
Karl Kröner in 1955

Karl Kröner (7 April 1887 – 3 October 1972) was a German painter and writer.

== Biography ==
Between 1904 and 1908, Kröner studied at the Royal Academy of Arts in Dresden.

He worked till 1910 as a freelancer in Chemnitz and studied again from 1910 to 1914 at the Royal Academy of Arts in Dresden under Eugen Bracht and Gotthardt Kuehl.

After going on a study trip to the Baltic Sea and the Netherlands, he moved to Niederlößnitz in 1914 to live with Paul Wilhelm and Wilhelm Claus. There he worked as a freelance artist.

Between 1915 and 1918, he was a soldier in the First World War. In 1923 and 1924, he went on two trips to Italy. Between 1924 and 1933 he was a member of the Artists' Association.

== Works ==
- Waldflechte (1906)
