= Friedrich Preller the Elder =

German painter (1804–1878)

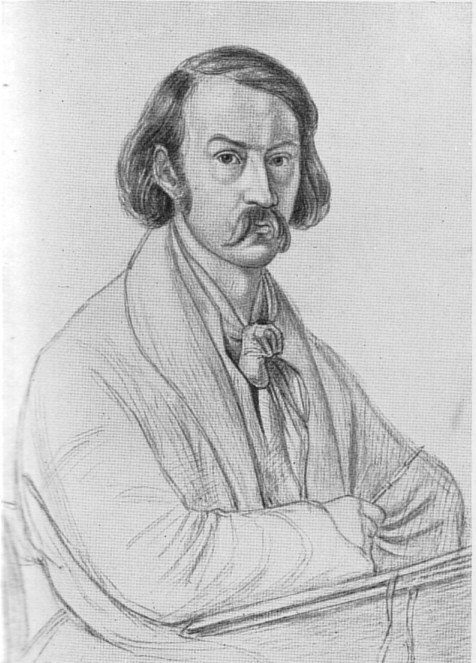
Friedrich Preller the Elder (date unknown)

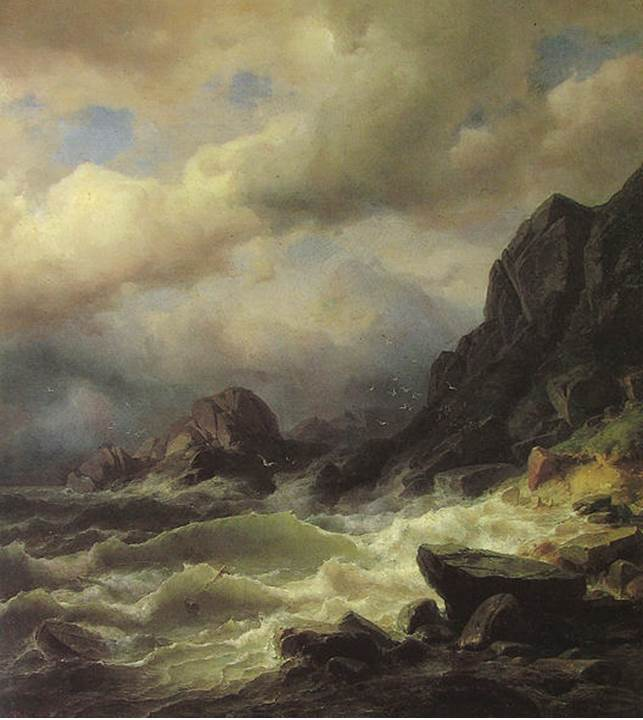
Storm on the Coast (1856)

Friedrich Preller the Elder (25 April 1804 in Eisenach – 23 April 1878 in Weimar) was a German landscape painter and etcher. From 1832 he was a professor at the Fürstlichen freien Zeichenschule in Weimar. He was the father of the artist Friedrich Preller the Younger.

== Life ==
He was born at Eisenach. After studying drawing at Weimar, he went in 1821, on Goethe's advice, to Dresden, where in 1824 he was invited to accompany the grand duke of Weimar to Belgium. He became a pupil in the academy at Antwerp. From 1827 to 1831 he studied in Italy, and in 1831 received an appointment in the Weimar school of art.

In 1834–1836 he executed in tempera six pictures on subjects taken from the Odyssey in the Roman House at Leipzig, in 1836–1837 the landscapes with scenes from Oberon in the Wieland room in the grand-ducal Schloss at Weimar, and in 1836–1848 six frescoes on Thuringian subjects commissioned by the grand duchess.

In 1840 he visited Norway and produced a number of easel works, some of which are preserved at Weimar. In 1859 he revisited Italy, and on his return in 1861 he completed for the grand-ducal museum the frescoes illustrative of the Odyssey, which are held to constitute his chief claim to fame. He returned to Weimar, where he died.

The "Preller family of painters" includes his son Friedrich Preller the Younger (1838–1901), his nephew Julius Preller (1834–1901) and Louis Preller (1822–1901), a distant relative of Friedrich Preller the Elder.
