= Friedrich Preller the Younger =

German painter

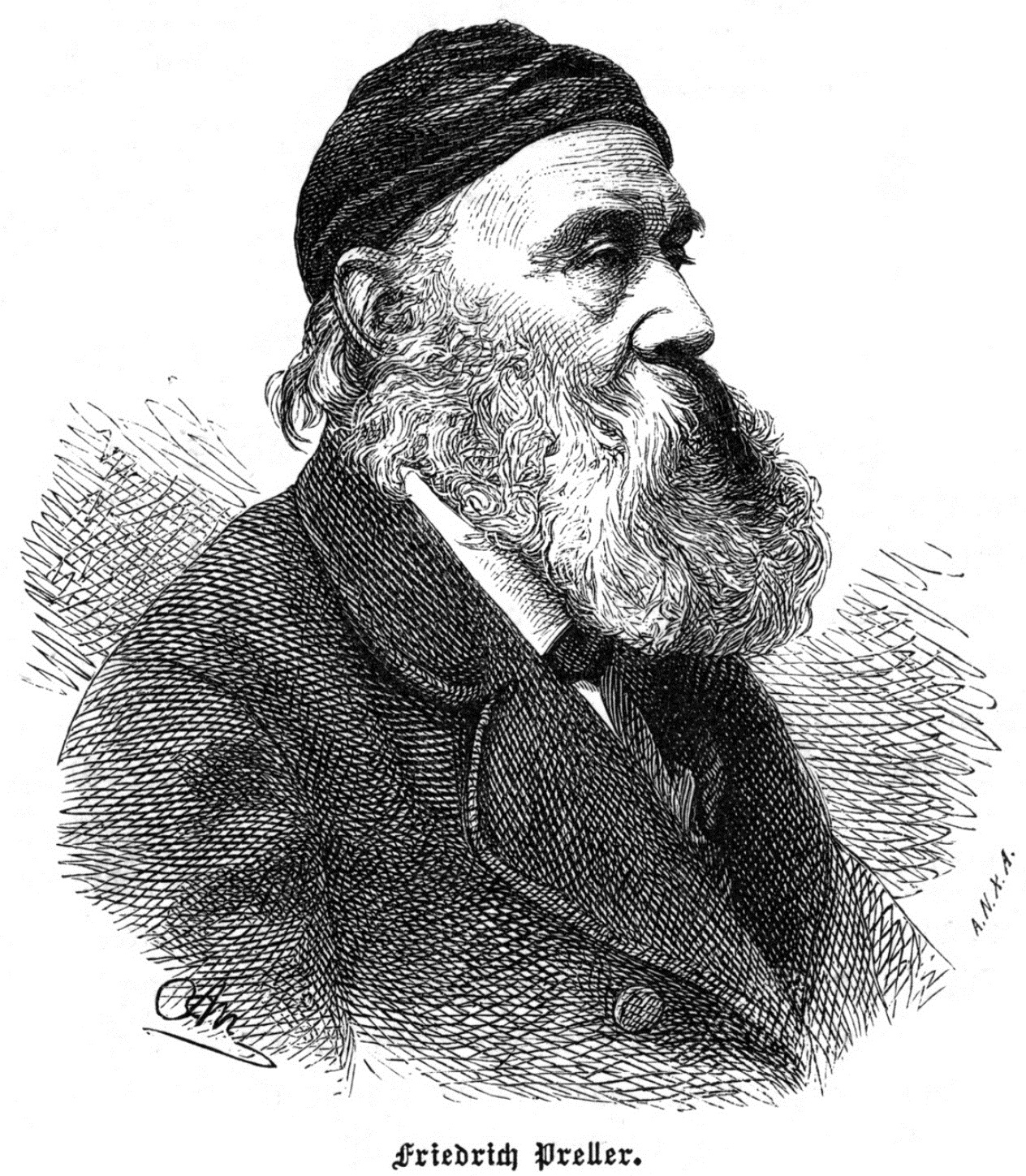
Illustration of Friedrick Preller the Jüngeren

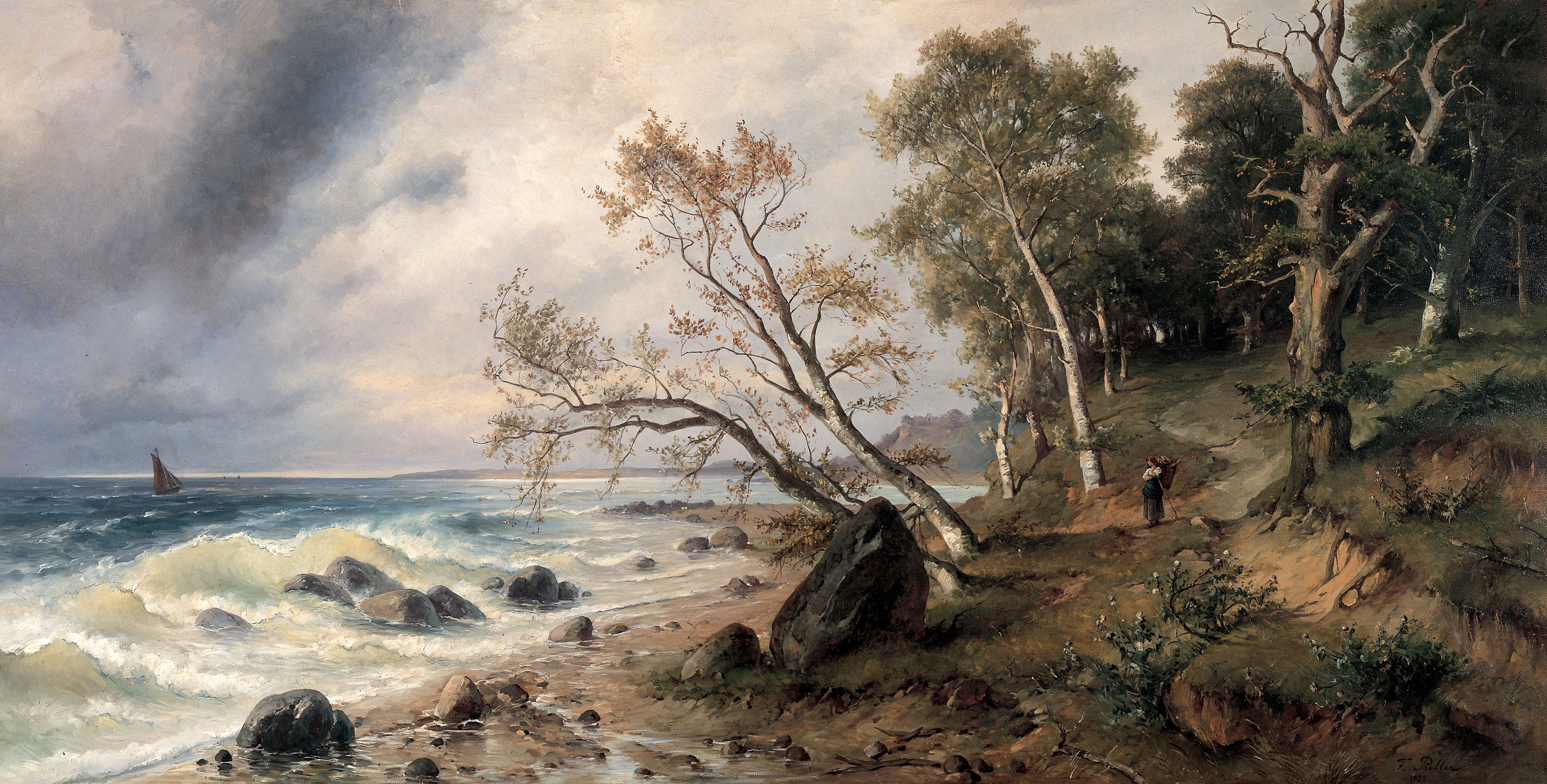
Baltic Sea Coast on the island of Vilm (1888)

Friedrich Preller (the Younger) (1 September 1838– 21 October 1901) was a German land and seascape painter.

== Life ==
He was born in Weimar as the youngest son of the painter, etcher and art professor Friedrich Preller the Elder. From the age of thirteen, he worked in his father's studio, where he received his first lessons. In 1859, he travelled to Italy with his father and, in 1862, undertook several excursions to the coast of Sicily and Naples to see the original landscapes he had read about in the Odyssey.

In 1864, he took another trip to Italy, returning to Dresden in 1866, where he established his own studio. Ten years later, he enjoyed his first artistic successes and began attracting commissions. In 1880, he became a professor at the Dresden Academy of Fine Arts. He continued to travel extensively, taking study trips to Rügen and Greece as well as Italy. He died in Blasewitz in 1901.

Most of his larger works were destroyed during the fire-bombing of Dresden in 1945. The loss included a series of murals on Greek mythological themes (Oedipus, Achilles, Hercules and the Golden Fleece) in the Semperoper; and others depicting Prometheus in the Albertinum.

His daughter Lucie married the sculptor Richard König. Together, they wrote a biography of her father, including texts that Preller himself had written as a young man.

== Writings ==
- Friedrich Preller der Jüngere, Max Jordan (ed.): Tagebücher des Künstlers (Diaries of the Artists), Kaufbeuren, 1904 Munich
