= En Canot =

Painting by Jean Metzinger

- Artist: Jean Metzinger
- Year: 1913
- Type: Black and white photograph obtained from a glass negative
- Medium: Oil on canvas
- Dimensions: 146 cm × 114 cm (57.5 in × 44.9 in)
- Location: Missing

En Canot is a Cubist oil painting created by Jean Metzinger in 1913. The work is referred to in various publications as Femme à l'ombrelle, Im Boot, Le Canot, En Bâteau, In the Canoe, The Boat, On the Beach, Am Strand, Im Schiff, V Člunu and Im Kanu. The painting was exhibited in Paris at the 1913 Salon d'Automne. The following year it was shown at Moderní umění, 45th Exhibition of SVU Mánes in Prague, February–March 1914 (a collection of works assembled by Alexandre Mercereau). This "Survey of Modern Art" was one of the last prewar exhibitions in Prague. En Canot was exhibited again, in July of the same year, at the Galerie Der Sturm, Berlin. The painting was acquired from Herwarth Walden in 1916 by Georg Muche at Galerie Der Sturm.

En Canot was exhibited in the Kronprinzenpalais, National Gallery, Berlin, 1930, where it had been housed since 1927. The work was acquired by the National Gallery in 1936 (on deposit by the Ministerium für Wissenschaft, Kunst und Volksbildung), where it was placed on display in Room 5. It was later confiscated by the Nazis around 1936, displayed at the Degenerate Art Exhibition (Entartete Kunst) in Munich and other cities, 1937–38, and has been missing ever since.

== Description ==
En Canot is a large oil painting on canvas with approximate dimensions 146 cm × 114 cm (57 in × 45 in), representing an elegantly dressed woman painted in a Cubist style holding an umbrella while she sits in a canoe or small boat. Water with undulating waves or ripples and two other boats are visible in the background. The vertical composition is divided, fragmented or faceted into series of non-Euclidean spherical arcs, hyperbolic triangles, rectangles, squares, planes or surfaces delineated by contrasting form.

Aimed at a large audience of the Salon d'Automne rather than the intimate setting of a gallery—just as other paintings by Metzinger of the pre-World War I period such as L'Oiseau bleu (The Blue Bird) exhibited at the Salon des Indépendants in the spring of 1913—there can be found in En Canot a continuity that transits between the foreground and background. For example, the two boats in the 'background' are smaller than the boat in the 'foreground' within which the model is sitting, consistent with classical perspective in that objects appear smaller as distance from the observer increases. However, to be perfectly consistent one would expect the boat on the top left of the composition to be smaller still than the boat just left of the models head. There is no perspectival fusion between objects close and far, yet the notion of depth perception has not been abolished. Overall, the spatial attributes of the scene are disjointed and flattened to the point where no absolute frame of reference can be determined.

Eadweard Muybridge, Draped woman opening a parasol and turning around, plate 461, published 1887

The chronophotography of Eadweard Muybridge and Étienne-Jules Marey had a profound influence on the beginnings of Cubism. These photographic motion studies particularly interested artists that would later form groups known as the Société Normande de Peinture Moderne and Section d'Or, including Jean Metzinger, Albert Gleizes and Marcel Duchamp.

A predecessor to cinematography and moving film, chronophotography involved a series or succession of different images, originally created and used for the scientific study of movement. These studies would directly influence Marcel Duchamp's Nude Descending a Staircase, No. 2 and could also be read into Metzinger's work of 1910–1914, though rather than simultaneously superimposing successive images to depict the motion, Metzinger represents the subject at rest viewed from multiple angles; the dynamic role is played by the artist rather than the subject.

Though not the first painting by Metzinger to employ the concept of multiple perspective—three years had passed since he first propounded the idea in Note sur la peinture, published in 1910—En Canot arguably exemplifies such pictorial processes, while still maintaining elements of recognizable form (the number 3, perhaps suggestive of a regatta, the woman, the umbrella, the boats); the extreme activity of geometric faceting visible in En Canot is not pushed to the point that any understandable link between physicality or naturalness is lost to the viewer. Yet, what is achieved is fundamentally anti-naturalistic.

The color schemes of other paintings executed during the same period, such as Le Fumeur, Portrait de Max Jacob, La Fumeuse (The Smoker) or La Femme à l'Éventail (Woman with a Fan), suggests that at the time of painting En Canot Metzinger had already moved away from the limited palette of 1911 and 1912.

Jean Metzinger, 1913, La Femme à l'Éventail (Woman with a Fan), oil on canvas, 92.8 cm × 65.2 cm (36.5 in × 25.7 in), Art Institute of Chicago, IL

On the opening day of the 1913 Salon d'Automne, art critic Louis Paillard, in a review published in Le Petit Journal, writes of Metzinger's entry:

You can recognize without difficulty ... that Metzinger sat a woman with an umbrella in a boat, a woman with her face cut into sections that we could reassemble easily enough, and which is not of unpleasant colors.

Guillaume Apollinaire, in his review of the Salon d'Automne published in Les Soirées de Paris, writes of En Canot (Femme à l'ombrelle):

I do not think the public resists, this year, the charm that exudes Femme à l'ombrelle by Metzinger. If one is sensitive to the beauty of the subject [matière], the variety of forms, to the flexibility [souplesse] of the lines, to the fantasy of the composition, one can not look with indifference at this delicious canvas.

Let's compare it to the somber Lutte of the funerary Mr. Valotton and we will have no qualms in passing to the cubist Jean Metzinger the Ingresque qualities we so lightly accorded Mr. Valotton. I love the delicious chinoiserie of your canvas, dear Metzinger, almost as much as the Chinese contours of Ingres.

=== Dimensions ===
Three photographs printed in the literary magazine Zlatá Praha, 13 March 1914, for the occasion of the Moderni Umeni, S.V.U. Mánes exhibition in Prague. From left to right: Tobeen, Pelotaris (1912), Constantin Brâncuși, Portrait of Mademoiselle Pogany (1912), Jean Metzinger, La Femme à l'Éventail (Woman with a Fan) and En Canot (V Člunu)

Film still-shot of the 1937 exhibition Entartete Kunst in which Metzinger's En Canot appears next to Willi Baumeister, Handstand, 1923, oil on canvas, 117 cm × 79 cm (46 in × 31 in) (both missing or destroyed following the exhibition). Steven Spielberg Film and Video Archive

The dimensions of En Canot are undocumented. However, Metzinger's painting is portrayed in a variety of black and white photographs shot between 1914 and 1930, and appears in a film recorded at the 1937 Degenerate Art Exhibition. Two of these images show the work hanging next to paintings of known dimensions. The earliest is a photograph taken in Prague, 1914, published in the magazine Zlatá Praha, where the painting is seen hanging next to Metzinger's La Femme à l'Éventail (Woman with a Fan), 1913, oil on canvas, 92.8 cm × 65.2 cm (36.5 in × 25.7 in), Art Institute of Chicago.

Another image, taken at the Degenerate Art Exhibition in 1937, shows En Canot next to Willi Baumeister, Handstand, 1923, oil on canvas, 117 cm × 79 cm (46 in × 31 in).

A straightforward calculation based on the dimensions of paintings visible in both of these images reveals dimensions for En Canot of 146 cm × 114 cm (57 in × 45 in). This corresponds to a standard stretcher (châssis) format referred to as 80 Figure (80 F). Chassis sizes in France are based on format P for paysage (landscape), relating to the principles of art and the diagonal of Fibonacci; the formats M for marine (seascapes); and F for figure (portrait), such as En Canot, are based on the Golden ratio. Most, if not all, of Metzinger's works from the period, including his monumental L'Oiseau bleu, are painted on canvases corresponding to these traditional formats; proportioning his works to approximate the golden ratio, in the belief that this proportion is aesthetically pleasing. The golden section (French: Section d'Or) and other similar geometric configurations symbolized for Metzinger and his colleagues a belief in order and the significance of mathematical proportions, because it reflected patterns and relationships occurring in nature. Metzinger, Albert Gleizes, the Duchamp brothers, and other members of the Section d'Or, were passionately interested in mathematics.

The golden proportion, upon which En Canot may have been based, represented simultaneously a continuity with past traditions and current trends in related fields, while leaving open future developments in the arts.

== History ==
The year 1913 saw the Cubist movement continuing to evolve, wrote Albert Gleizes:

The changes it had already undergone since the Indépendants of 1911 could leave people in no doubt as to its nature. Cubism was not a school, distinguished by some superficial variation on a generally accepted norm. It was a total regeneration, indicating the emergence of a wholly new cast of mind. Every season it appeared renewed, growing like a living body. Its enemies could, eventually, have forgiven it if only it had passed away, like a fashion; but they became even more violent when they realised that it was destined to live a life that would be longer than that of those painters who had been the first to assume the responsibility for it.

At the 1913 Salon des Indépendants could be seen a very large work of Jean Metzinger's - L'Oiseau Bleu; L'Equipe de Cardiff from Robert Delaunay; two important canvasses from Léger; still lifes and L'Homme au Café from Juan Gris; enthusiastic new work from La Fresnaye and from Marcoussis, and from others again; and finally, from myself, Les Joueurs de Football.

Again, to the Salon d'Automne of 1913 - a salon in which Cubism was now the predominating tendency - Metzinger sent the great picture called En Bâteau, La Fresnaye La Conquête de l'Air, myself Les Bâteaux de Pêche and La Ville et le Fleuve. If the first moment of surprise had passed by, the interest Cubism excited was as great as ever. The anger and the enthusiasm had not changed sides, our enemies held to their guns. It is enough for proof to read the diatribes of Louis Vauxcelles in Gil Blas for that year, 1913, and the panegyrics of Guillaume Apollinaire in L'Intransigeant.

Metzinger's En Canot at the Kronprinzenpalais, Nationalgalerie, Berlin, 1930; works later found in the Degenerate Art Exhibition (Entartete Kunst)

En Canot was acquired at the Galerie Der Sturm in 1916 by the artist Georg Muche, whose father was a naïve painter and art collector known as Felix Muche-Ramholz. The Galerie Der Sturm founded in 1912 by Herwarth Walden in Berlin became the core of Berlin's modern art scene, lasting a decade. Starting with an exhibition of Fauves and Der Blaue Reiter, followed by the introduction in Germany of Cubism and Italian Futurism.

En Canot was exhibited in 1930 at the Kronprinzenpalais, National Gallery, Berlin, along with works by Willi Baumeister, Oskar Schlemmer, Rudolf Belling and others (works later found in Entartete Kunst).

It was subsequently confiscated by the German Reich Ministry of Public Enlightenment and Propaganda (Reichsministerium für Volksaufklärung und Propaganda, RMVP or Propagandaministerium) in 1936 or 1937 and displayed at the Degenerate Art exhibition (Entartete Kunst) in Munich. The exhibition traveled to several other cities in Germany and Austria. The show, mounted by the Nazis, consisted of modern art chaotically hung and accompanied by text labels deriding the art. Paintings were hung crowded together, some with no frames, alongside racist slogans denigrating the artists for "insulting German womanhood" and revealing "sick minds." It was designed to inflame public opinion against Modernism. The painting was apparently moved to Güstrow by the Rote Armee (Red Army) and has been missing ever since.

Metzinger's Im Boot along with works by Johannes Molzahn and Kurt Schwitters were reproduced in the Exhibition of Degenerate Art catalogue. A sentence on the top of the page reads "Selbst das wurde einmal ernst genommen und hoch bezahlt!"

Even this was once taken seriously and bought for good money!

The Entartete-Kunst catalogue dedicated two pages to Room 5, the largest room of the exhibition, with works exhibited by the so-called Group 9, of which Metzinger's work entitled Am Strand (At the Beach) figures. A text accompanying the works singles out Molzahn, Metzinger and Schwitters, summarizing the essence of the entire exhibition:

Entartete Kunst, Group 9, Degenerate Art Exhibition catalogue, 1937, p. 23. Works from top left to lower right: Johannes Molzahn, Der Gott der Flieger, 1921, oil on canvas. Jean Metzinger, En Canot ("On the Beach"), 1913. Kurt Schwitters, Merzbild, 1918–19, mixed media, 100 x 70 cm. Johannes Molzahn, Familienbild

Entartete-Kunst, Group 9: This section can only be entitled Sheer insanity. It occupies the largest room in the exhibition, and contains a cross section of the abortions produced by all the isms thought up, promoted, and peddled over the years by Flechtheim, Wollheim, and their cohorts. In the case of most of the paintings and drawings in this particular chamber of horrors there is no telling what was in the sick brains of those who wielded the brush or the pencil. One of them ended up by painting with only the contents of garbage cans. Another was content with three black lines and a piece of wood on a large white ground. A third had the bright idea of painting a number of circles on two square metres of canvas. A fourth used a good two kilograms of paint in painting three successive self-portraits because he could not figure out whether his head was green or sulfurous yellow, round or angular, his eyes red or sky blue or whatever. In this insanity group, visitors to the exhibition usually just shake their heads and smile. Not without cause, certainly. But when we reflect that all these works of art have been removed, not from the dusty corners of deserted studios, but from the art collections and museums of the great German cities, where some of them still met the gaze of an astonished public during the first years that followed the Leader's assumption of power, then it is no laughing matter, then we can only choke back our fury that so decent a people as the Germans could ever have been so foully abused.

The current location of En Canot is unknown and it may have been destroyed by the Germans. After the exhibit, paintings were sorted out for sale and sold in Switzerland at auction. Some works were acquired by museums, others by private collectors. Nazi officers took many for their private use: for example, Hermann Göring took fourteen valuable pieces, including works by Vincent van Gogh and Paul Cézanne. In March 1939, the Berlin Fire Brigade burned approximately 4000 works which had less value on the international market.

Jean Metzinger, 1913, Etude pour En canot, pencil drawing on paper, 28 x 23.5 cm, Musée National d'Art Moderne, Centre Pompidou, Paris

En Canot is listed on the Lost Art Internet Database with the title "Im Boot", inventory number: Museum A II 698; EK 16056. It is also listed in the Degenerate Art Database, with the titles "Im Boot" and "Im Kanu", inventory number 16056. This Internet database documents more than 21,000 artworks condemned as "degenerate" by the Nazis and seized from German museums in 1937.

A preparatory drawing (study for Le Canot, Musée National d'Art Moderne, Centre Georges Pompidou, Paris) was published in Les Soirées de Paris, no. 19, 1913. Les Soirées de Paris is the title of a literature and art review magazine. They were published in two series: the first series from February 1912 to June 1913 (No. 1 - No. 17); the second in November 1913 to July–August 1914 (No. 18 - No. 27). The magazine was founded by Serge Férat, Guillaume Apollinaire and André Salmon, et al. It was in part to facilitate the return of Apollinaire to the literary scene after having been suspected in the theft of the Mona Lisa (September 1911).

Another drawing of the same subject, now in the Musée d'Art Moderne de la Ville de Paris, is signed and inscribed by Metzinger; Dessin pour "En Canot", leading to the belief that the correct title for the present work is En Canot.

== Provenance ==
- Acquired in 1916 by Georg Muche at the Galerie Der Sturm
- 1930 - Berlin, Nationalgalerie (Kronprinzen-Palais), 1929 Kauf durch den Minister auf der Ausstellung "10 Jahre Novembergruppe" aus einer von Georg Muche angebotenen Sammlung; 1930 Überweisung an die Nationalgalerie
- Acquired by the Nationalgalerie, Berlin, in 1936 (on deposit by the Ministerium für Wissenschaft, Kunst und Volksbildung), Room 5, NS inventory no. 16056. Titled Im Kanu (In the canoe).
- 07.07.1937 - xx: Deutsches Reich / Reichsministerium für Volksaufklärung und Propaganda, Berlin, Beschlagnahme
- 1938 - xx: Velten/Mark, Depot für Propagandaausstellungen, Lagerung der Exponate für die Wanderausstellung "Entartete Kunst"

== Exhibitions ==
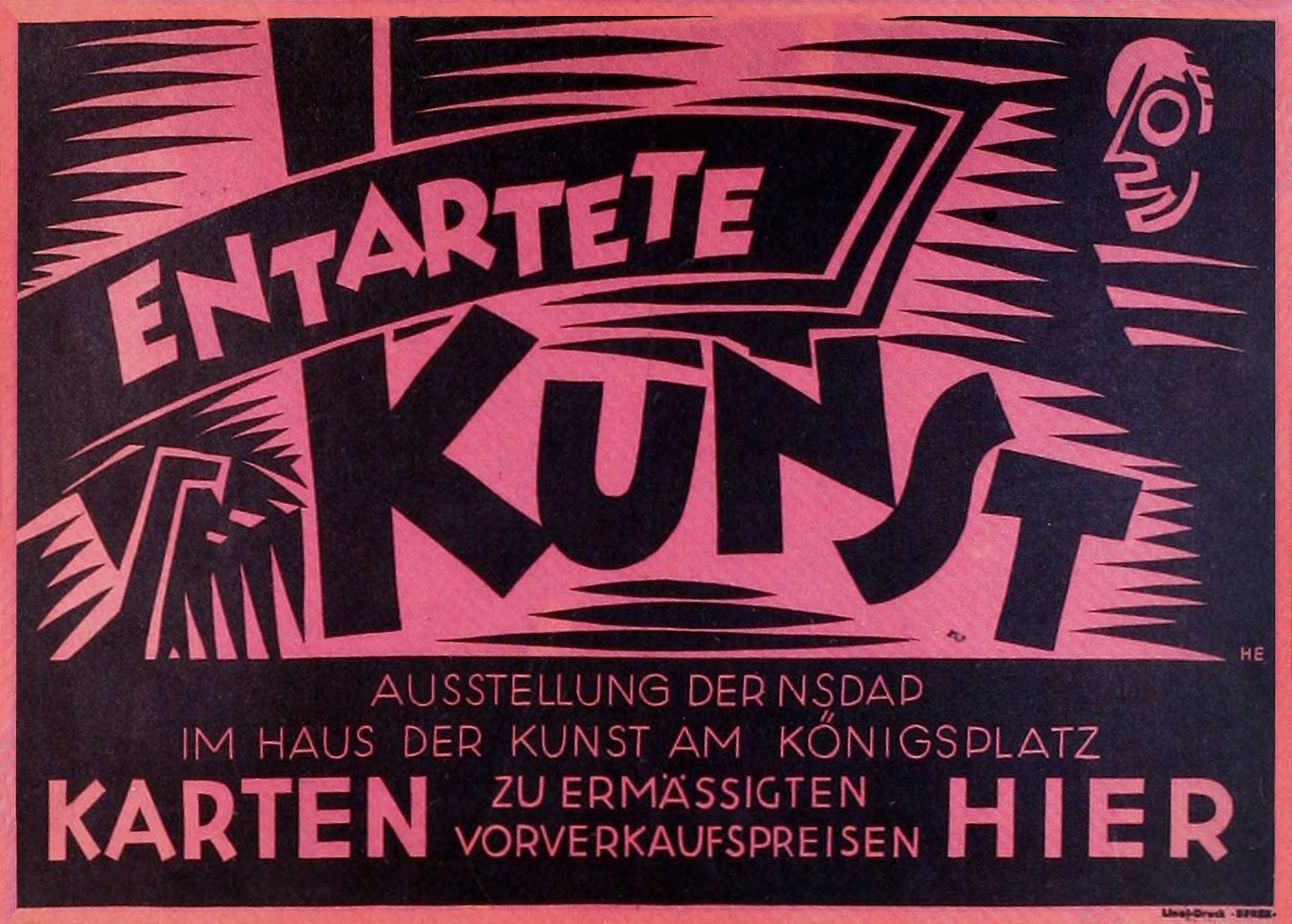
Entartete Kunst poster, Berlin, 1938

- Salon d'Automne, Paris, 15 November 1913 – 8 January 1914
- Moderni Umeni, S.V.U. Mánes, Prague, February–March 1914
- Galerie Der Sturm, July 1914, Berlin
- Kronprinzenpalais, National Gallery, Berlin, 1930, where it had been since 1927
- Entartete Kunst (2.1), München, Hofgarten-Arkaden, 19.07.1937 - 30.11.1937
- Entartete Kunst (2.2), Berlin, Haus der Kunst, 26.02.1938 - 08.05.1938
- Entartete Kunst (2.3), Leipzig, Grassi-Museum, 13.05.1938 - 06.06.1938
- Entartete Kunst (2.4), Düsseldorf, Kunstpalast, 18.06.1938 - 07.08.1938
- Entartete Kunst (2.5), Salzburg, Festspielhaus, 04.09.1938 - 02.10.1938
- Entartete Kunst (2.6), Hamburg, Schulausstellungsgebäude, 11.11.1938 - 30.12.1938

== Literature ==
- Zlatá Praha, 13 March 1914, magazine article for the occasion of the Moderni Umeni, S.V.U. Mánes exhibition in Prague (reproduced).
- Albert Gleizes, The Epic, From immobile form to mobile form, 1913–1914, First published in German, entitled Kubismus, 1928. The French version, L'Epopée (The Epic), was published in the journal Le Rouge et le Noir, 1929. The first version was written in response to an invitation from the Bauhaus in 1925. Translation by Peter Brooke.
- Reich Propaganda Directorate, Culture Office, Degenerate Art Exhibition guide, 1938.
- Roh, Franz, "Entartete" Kunst. Kunstbarbarei im Dritten Reich, Hannover 1962. S. 136.
- Steven Spielberg Film and Video Archive, German town; Degenerate Art exhibit in Munich, Story RG-60.2668, Tape 951. Film in which Metzinger's work appears next to Handstand by Willi Baumeister at the Degenerate Art exhibition, minute 16:33 - 16:39.
- Roters, Eberhard, (Hrsg.), Stationen der Moderne. Kataloge epochaler Kunstausstellungen in Deutschland 1910–1962. Kommentarband zu den Nachdrucken der zehn Ausstellungskataloge. Kommentarband, 1988, S. 163.
- Moser, Joann, with an essay by Daniel Robbins, Jean Metzinger in Retrospect, The University of Iowa Museum of Art, J. Paul Getty Trust, University of Washington Press), 1985 p. 60.
- Degenerate Art. The Fate of the Avant-Garde in Nazi Germany, Ausst.-Kat. Los Angeles County Museum of Art, LACMA, 1991, hrsg. von Stephanie Barron, 1991. S. 61, 300.61, 300.
- Janda, Annegret und Grabowski, Jörn, Kunst in Deutschland 1905–1937. Die verlorene Sammlung der Nationalgalerie, Berlin 1992. S. 161f. Abb. S. S. 161, Kat. Nr. 317.
- Steinfeld, Ludwig, Felix Ramholz: Der Sonntagsmaler Felix Muche-Ramholz, Ernst Wasmuth Verlag Tübingen/Berlin 1993.
- Zuschlag, Christoph, "Entartete Kunst". Ausstellungsstrategien im Nazi-Deutschland, Worms 1995. S. 195, 239, 268, 273.
- Engelhardt, Katrin, Die Ausstellung "Entartete Kunst" in Berlin. Rekonstruktion und Analyse, in: Uwe Fleckner (Hrsg.), Angriff auf die Avantgarde. Kunst und Kunstpolitik im Nationalsozialismus, Berlin 2007, S. 89-188. S. 177.

== See also ==
- List of works by Jean Metzinger
