= Degenerate Art exhibition =

1937 art exhibition in Nazi Germany

Degenerate Art Exhibition
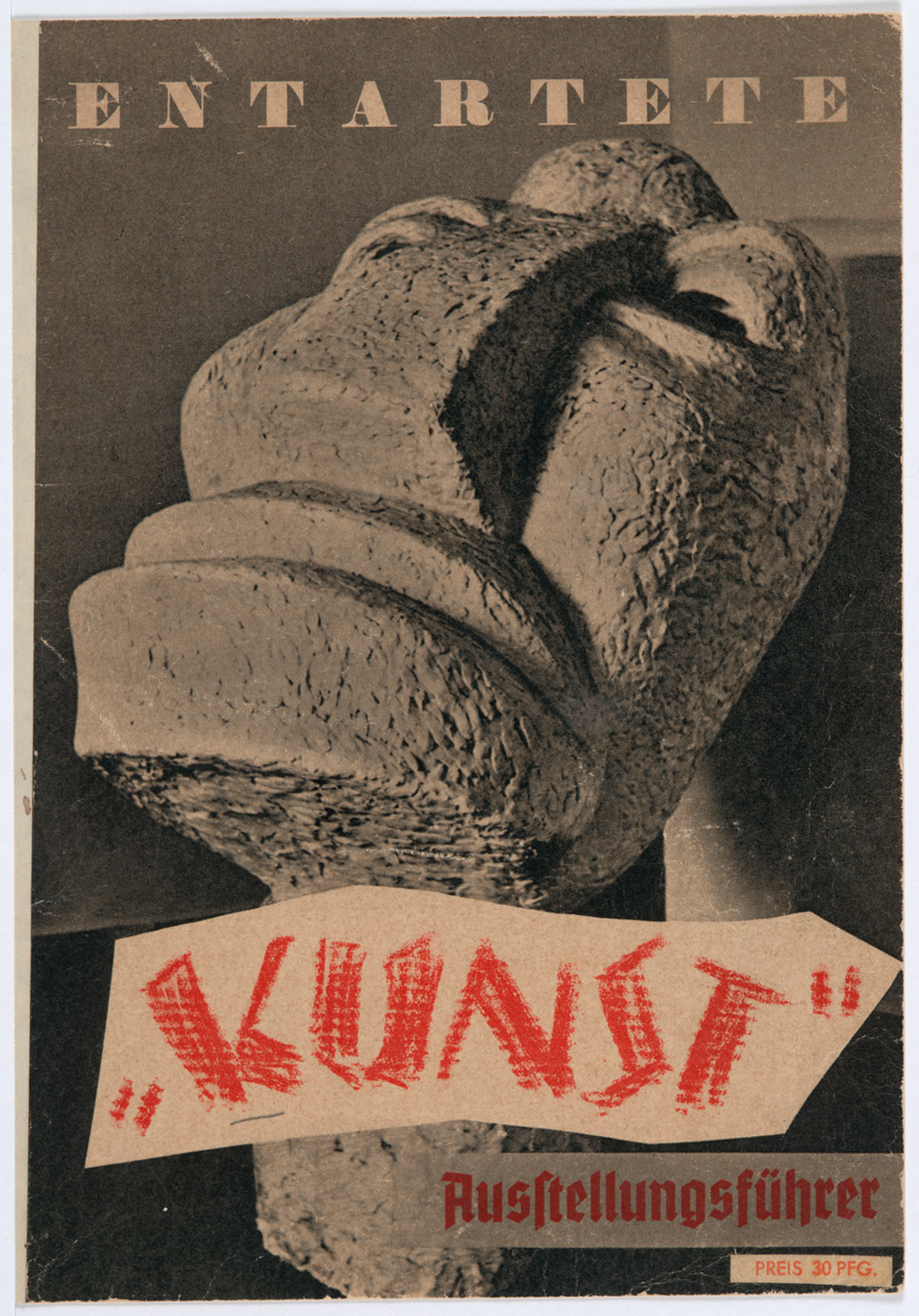
- Cover of the exhibition program: Degenerate Art Exhibition, 1937. The word "Kunst," meaning art, is in scare quotes; the artwork is Otto Freundlich's sculpture Der Neue Mensch.
- Date: 19 July – 30 November 1937 (5 months)
- Location: Institute of Archaeology in the Hofgarten
- Theme: Propaganda
- Motive: To scapegoat the avant-garde and exalt classical and neoclassical art, which lionized Nazism
- Target: Jewish artists, Modernism and 650 pieces of art confiscated from German museums
- Organized by: Adolf Ziegler and the Nazi Party

The Degenerate Art exhibition (German: Die Ausstellung "Entartete Kunst") was an art exhibition organized by Adolf Ziegler and the Nazi Party in Munich from 19 July to 30 November 1937. The exhibition presented 650 works of art, confiscated from German museums, and was staged in counterpoint to the concurrent Great German Art Exhibition. The day before the exhibition started, Adolf Hitler delivered a speech declaring "merciless war" on cultural disintegration, attacking "chatterboxes, dilettantes and art swindlers". Degenerate art was defined as works that "insult German feeling, or destroy or confuse natural form or simply reveal an absence of adequate manual and artistic skill". Entry was free. One million people attended the exhibition in its first six weeks, and another two million in the remaining six months in Munich. Another million saw the exhibition on tour. According to Frederic Spotts, it was "the biggest blockbuster art show of all time." A U.S. critic commented that "[t]here are probably plenty of people—art lovers—in Boston, who will side with Hitler in this particular purge". This view was controversial, however, given the greater political context of the exhibition.

== Background ==
Hitler's rise to power on 30 January 1933 was quickly followed by actions intended to cleanse the culture of so-called degeneracy: book burnings were organized, artists and musicians were dismissed from teaching positions, and museum curators were replaced by Party members. In September 1933 the Reichskulturkammer (Reich Culture Chamber) was established, administered by Joseph Goebbels, Hitler's Reichsminister für Volksaufklärung und Propaganda (Reich Minister for Public Enlightenment and Propaganda).

Entartete Kunst, Degenerate Art Exhibition catalogue, 1937, p. 23. Works from top left to lower right: * Johannes Molzahn, Der Gott der Flieger, 1921, oil on canvas. * Jean Metzinger, En Canot ("On the Beach"), 1913. * Kurt Schwitters, Merzbild, 1918–19, mixed media, 100 x 70 cm. * Johannes Molzahn, Familienbild

The arbiter of what was unacceptably "modern" was Hitler. Although Goebbels and some others admired the Expressionist works of artists such as Emil Nolde, Ernst Barlach, and Erich Heckel, a faction led by Alfred Rosenberg despised the Expressionists, and the result was a bitter ideological dispute which was settled only in September 1934, when Hitler – who denounced modern art and its practitioners as "incompetents, cheats and madmen" – declared that there would be no place for modernist experimentation in the Reich.

In the first half of 1937, preparations were underway for the Große Deutsche Kunstausstellung ("Great German Art Exhibition"), which was to showcase art approved by the Nazis. An open invitation to German artists resulted in 15,000 works being submitted to the exhibition jury, which included allies of Goebbels. When the works they selected for the exhibition were shown to Hitler for his approval, he became enraged. Hitler dismissed the jury and appointed his personal photographer Heinrich Hoffmann to make a new selection.

In a diary entry of 4 June 1937, Goebbels conceived the idea of a separate exhibition of works from the Weimar era, which he called "the era of decay. So the people can see and understand." The art historian Olaf Peters says Goebbels' motivation in proposing the exhibition was partly to obscure the weakness of the works in the Great German Art Exhibition, and partly to regain Hitler's trust after the dictator's replacement of Goebbel's jurors with Hoffmann, who Goebbels feared as a rival. On 30 June, Hitler signed an order authorising the Degenerate Art Exhibition.

Goebbels put Adolf Ziegler, the head of the Reichskammer der Bildenden Künste (Reich Chamber of Visual Art), in charge of a five-man commission that included, among others, art historian, director of the Museum Folkwang, Count Klaus von Baudissin (1891–1961); painter and art critic Wolfgang Willrich; propaganda illustrator Hans Schweitzer (1901–1980); art theorist Robert Scholz, and writer Walter Hansen. Joseph Goebbels also appears to have participated in the work.

The commission toured state collections in numerous cities, in two weeks seizing 5,238 works they deemed degenerate (showing qualities such as "decadence", "weakness of character", "mental disease", and "racial impurity"). This collection would be boosted by subsequent raids on museums, for future exhibitions. The commission focused on works by artists mentioned in avant-garde publications, and was aided by some vehement opponents of modern art, such as Wolfgang Willrich.

The exhibition was prepared in haste, to be presented concurrently with the Große Deutsche Kunstausstellung ("Great German Art Exhibition") scheduled to open on 18 July 1937. Imitating Hitler, Ziegler delivered a mordant critique of modern art at the opening of the Degenerate Art Exhibition on 19 July 1937.

== Event ==
The exhibition was hosted at the Institute of Archaeology in the Hofgarten in Munich. The venue was chosen for its particular qualities (dark, narrow rooms). Many works were displayed without frames and partially covered by derogatory slogans. Photographs of the exhibitions had been made, as well as a catalogue, produced for the Berlin show, which accompanied the exhibition as it travelled. A film of sections of the exhibition had also been produced. The Degenerate Art Exhibition included 650 paintings, sculptures and prints by 112 artists, primarily German: Georg Grosz, Ernst Ludwig Kirchner, Paul Klee, Georg Kolbe, Wilhelm Lehmbruck, Franz Marc, Emil Nolde, Otto Dix, Willi Baumeister, Kurt Schwitters and others. Ziegler also confiscated and exhibited works of foreign artists, such as Pablo Picasso, Jean Metzinger, Albert Gleizes, Grant Wood, Piet Mondrian, Marc Chagall and Wassily Kandinsky. A large number of works were not displayed, as the exhibition focused on German works. The exhibition lasted until 30 November 1937, and 2,009,899 visitors attended it, an average of 20,000 people per day.

=== Layout ===
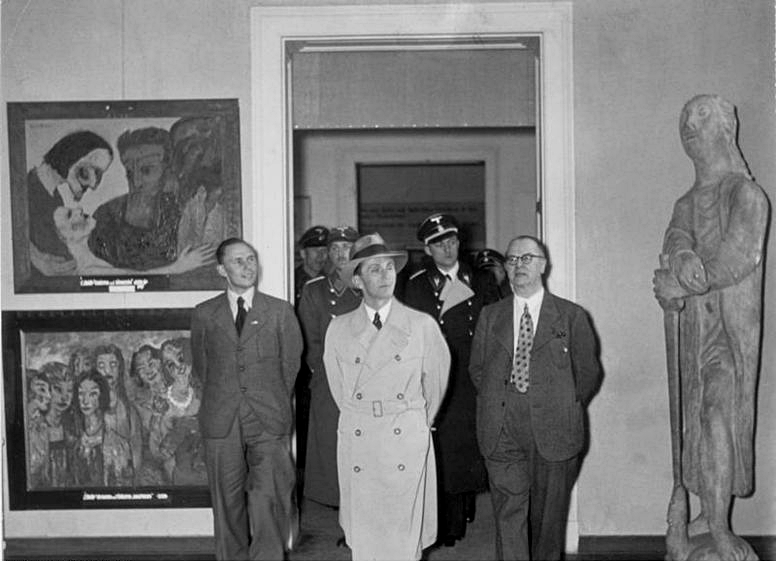
Goebbels views the Degenerate Art exhibition, with two paintings of Emil Nolde hanging to the left.

The first three rooms were grouped thematically. The first room contained works considered demeaning of religion; the second featured works by Jewish artists in particular; the third contained works deemed insulting to the women, soldiers and farmers of Germany. The rest of the exhibit had no particular theme.

There were slogans painted on the walls. For example:

- Insolent mockery of the Divine under Centrist rule
- Revelation of the Jewish racial soul
- An insult to German womanhood
- The ideal—cretin and whore
- Deliberate sabotage of national defence
- German farmers—a Yiddish view
- The Jewish longing for the wilderness reveals itself—in Germany the Negro becomes the racial ideal of a degenerate art
- Madness becomes method
- Nature as seen by sick minds
- Even museum bigwigs called this the "art of the German people"

=== Political goals ===
Jean Metzinger, 1913, En Canot (Im Boot), oil on canvas, 146 x 114 cm, exhibited at Moderni Umeni, S.V.U. Mánes, Prague, 1914, acquired in 1916 by Georg Muche at the Galerie Der Sturm, confiscated by the Nazis c. 1936 from the Kronprinzenpalais, Nationalgalerie, Berlin, displayed at the Degenerate Art Exhibition in Munich, and missing ever since

Speeches of Nazi party leaders contrasted with artist manifestos from various art movements, such as Dada and Surrealism. Next to many paintings were labels indicating how much money a museum spent to acquire the artwork. In the case of paintings acquired during the post-war Weimar hyperinflation of the early 1920s, when the cost of a kilo loaf of bread reached 233 billion German marks, the prices of the paintings were greatly exaggerated. The exhibit was designed to promote the idea that modernism was a conspiracy by people who hated German decency, frequently identified as Jewish-Bolshevist, although only six of the 112 artists included in the exhibition were Jewish.

The concurrent Große Deutsche Kunstausstellung ("Great German Art Exhibition") was intended to show the more classical and "racially pure" type of art advocated by the Nazi regime. That exhibition was hosted near Hofgarten, in the Haus der Deutschen Kunst. It is described as mediocre by modern sources, and attracted only about half the numbers of the Degenerate Art one.

== Subsequent events ==
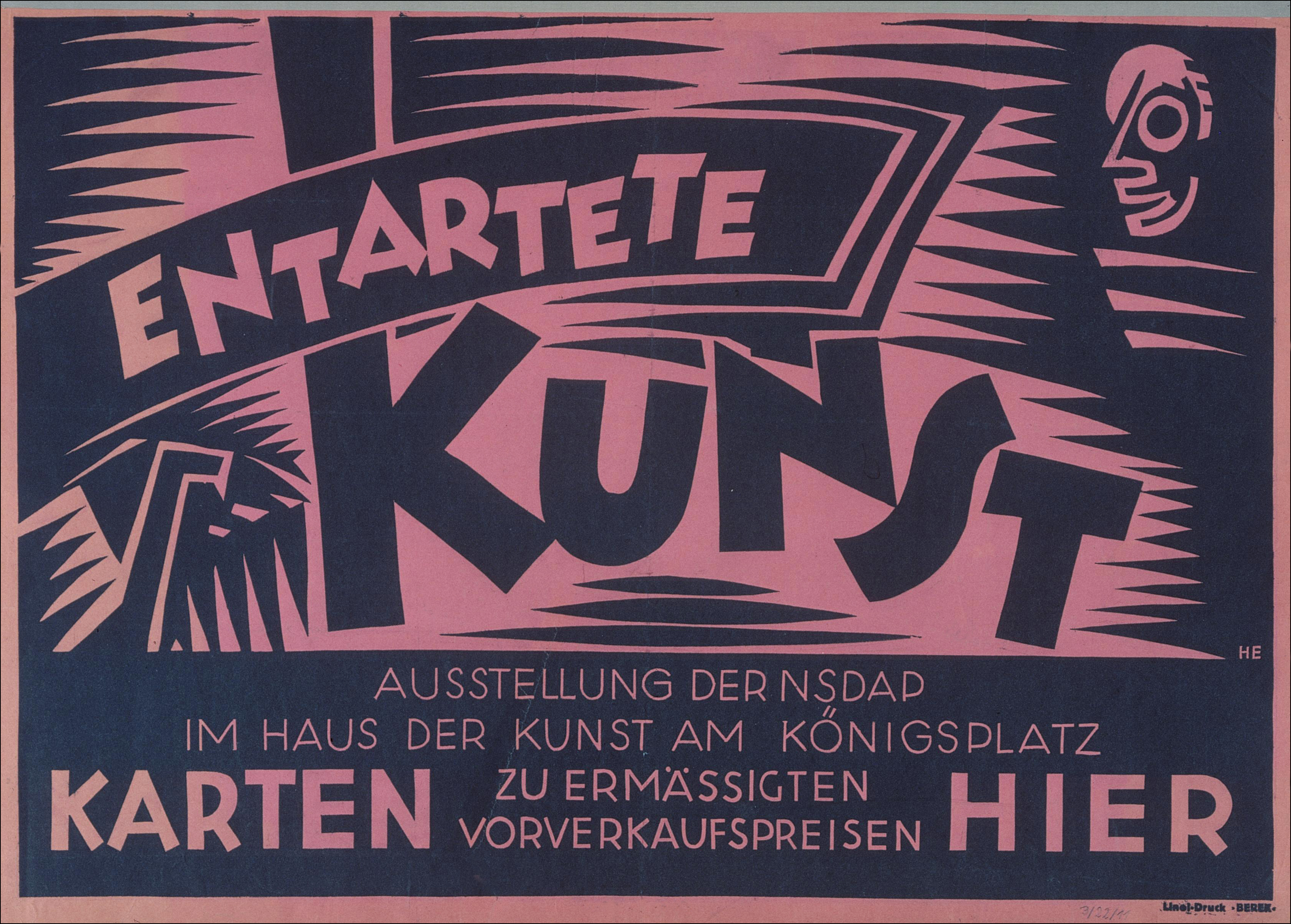
Entartete Kunst, poster for the 1938 exhibition in the house of art at Koenigsplatz in Munich

Another Degenerate Art Exhibition was hosted a few months later in Berlin, and later in Leipzig, Düsseldorf, Weimar, Halle, Vienna and Salzburg, to be seen by another million or so people. Many works were later sold off, although interested buyers were scarce and prices dropped drastically with the addition of such a large quantity of works to the art market. Goebbels wrote of them changing hands between U.S. collectors for "ten cents a kilo", although some "foreign exchange ... will go into the pot for war expenses, and after the war will be devoted to the purchase of art." Almost 5,000 were burned on 20 March 1939. In June 1939, an auction took place in Lucerne, where 125 degenerate artworks were put on sale. The revenue of the exhibit was of about $125,000, much less than expected.

In 1991, the Los Angeles County Museum of Art staged a forensic reproduction of the exhibition.

Three hundred of the exhibited works were apparently purchased or otherwise appropriated by art dealer Hildebrand Gurlitt, who had reported them destroyed by bombardments; however, they resurfaced when details of the Gurlitt Collection which had been inherited by his son Cornelius were discovered in 2012. Cornelius Gurlitt left the collection to the Museum of Fine Arts Bern in Switzerland which in November 2017 exhibited a number of them in an exhibition entitled "Gurlitt: Status Report: Degenerate Art – Confiscated and Sold".

In 2014, the Neue Galerie New York staged Degenerate Art: The Attack on Modern Art in Nazi Germany, 1937, an exhibition bringing together paintings and sculptures from the 1937 exhibition along with films and photos of the original installations, promotional and propaganda materials and some surviving Nazi-approved art from the official exhibition set up to contrast with the modernist and avant-garde works the Nazis considered "degenerate".

From July 2017 to February 2020, the Museum of Modern Art ran a digital exhibit that showcased artwork from the Degenerate Art Exhibition. MoMA highlighted a collection of works that were deemed "degenerate art" and removed from German state-owned museums by the Nazi government.

== See also ==
- Ahnenerbe
- Art of the Third Reich
- Degenerate music
- The Eternal Jew (art exhibition)
- Exhibition of the Fascist Revolution
