= Woman with a Fan (Metzinger, 1913) =

Painting by Jean Metzinger

- La Femme à l'Éventail (French)
- Artist: Jean Metzinger
- Year: c. 1913
- Medium: Oil on canvas
- Dimensions: 92.7 cm × 65.7 cm (36.5 in × 25.85 in)
- Location: Art Institute of Chicago, Chicago

Woman with a Fan (French: La Femme à l'Éventail) is a painting by the French artist Jean Metzinger. The work was exhibited in 1914 at Moderni Umeni, S.V.U. Mánes, Prague. A 1914 photograph taken at the exhibition in Prague was published in the magazine Zlatá Praha showing Woman with a Fan hanging next to another work by Metzinger known as En Canot (Im Boot, The Boat), 1913. Donated by Mr and Mrs Sigmund Kunstadter in 1959, Woman with a Fan forms part of the permanent collection in Gallery 391B (Medieval to Modern European Painting and Sculpture) at the Art Institute of Chicago, US. On September 22, 2026, the Art Institute announced it was returning the painting to heirs of its original owners after it was determined the painting was sold in a forced sale in 1940 in Nazi-occupied Amsterdam.

== Description ==
Three photographs printed in the magazine Zlatá Praha (Golden Prague in Czech), 13 March 1914, for the occasion of the Moderni Umeni, S.V.U. Mánes exhibition in Prague. From left to right: Tobeen, Pelotaris (1912), Constantin Brâncuși, Portrait of Mademoiselle Pogany (1912), Jean Metzinger, La Femme à l'Éventail (Woman with a Fan) and En Canot (Im Boot, The Boat)

Woman with a Fan, signed JMetzinger (lower left) is an oil painting on canvas with dimensions 92.7 x 65.7 cm (36 1/2 x 25 7/8 in.), representing an elegantly dressed Parisian woman, perhaps Lucie Soubiron, whom Metzinger married in 1909, painted in a geometrically Cubist style with a stylish feathered or plumed hat while holding a fan (visible to the lower right). A vase on a table and decorative wall paper can be seen in the background. The vertical composition is divided, fragmented or faceted into series rectangular and square surfaces accentuated by the flowing curvilinear forms of the models garments and hat.

Rather than depicting the Woman with a Fan from one point of view, Metzinger has used a 'mobile perspective' to portray the subject from a variety of locations and from different angles, her detailed face, neck and hat are observed from a succession of spatial angles or locations captured over an extended period of time, resulting in a complex series of profile and frontal views seen simultaneously.

One of the most accomplished works of this period, Woman with a fan "anticipates Picasso in exploring the legacy of Neo-Impressionism:

"The subject is again a woman with a plumed hat, but now the girl is a cohesive factor used to break down space and bring the figure and houses together. Here too, however, lines and planes take the forms of arabesques and decorative patterns. The constant use and re-use of Cubist structural devises in this manner suggests that Metzinger never ceased to consider them more than "mannerist" devices, through which reality was filtered but not basically altered." (Albright-Knox Art Gallery, 1967)

Here Metzinger is almost exclusively concerned with principles of pictorial construction: the interplay of horizontals, verticals and curves, with color playing an important but secondary role.

Rather than depicting the Woman with a Fan from one classical point of view, Metzinger has used a 'mobile perspective' to portray the subject from a variety of locations and from different angles. The images captured from multiple spatial view-points and at successive time intervals are all shown together on one canvas.

The observer now played an active role. The reconstruction of the total image was left to the creative intuition of each individual. The sum of the parts from which the 'total image' is composed now resides in the mind of the observer. The dynamism of form set in motion by the artist (who chose the multiple view points rather than just one), implicit or explicit within the properties of the work, could be reassembled and understood in an interactive dynamic process.

"But we cannot enjoy in isolation" wrote Metzinger and Gleizes in Du "Cubisme", "we wish to dazzle others with that which we daily snatch from the world of sense, and in return we wish others to show us their trophies."

This reciprocity between the artist and the public is perhaps one of the reasons Metzinger felt the need to include elements of the real world into his paintings of the period, untouched by the wrath of total abstraction. "The reminiscence of natural forms cannot be absolutely banished; not yet, at all events" wrote Metzinger and Gleizes in 1912. Art, to them, could not "be raised to the level of a pure effusion at the first step."

== Related works ==
Jean Metzinger, 1912, Landscape (Marine, Composition Cubiste), oil on canvas, 51.4 x 68.6 cm, Fogg Art Museum, Harvard University. Published in Herwarth Walden, Einblick in Kunst: Expressionismus, Futurismus, Kubismus (1917), Der Sturm, 1912–1917

Jean Metzinger, 1913, En Canot (Im Boot), oil on canvas, 146 x 114 cm (57.5 in × 44.9 in), possibly destroyed by the Nazi regime after the Degenerate art exhibitions of 1937 and 1938

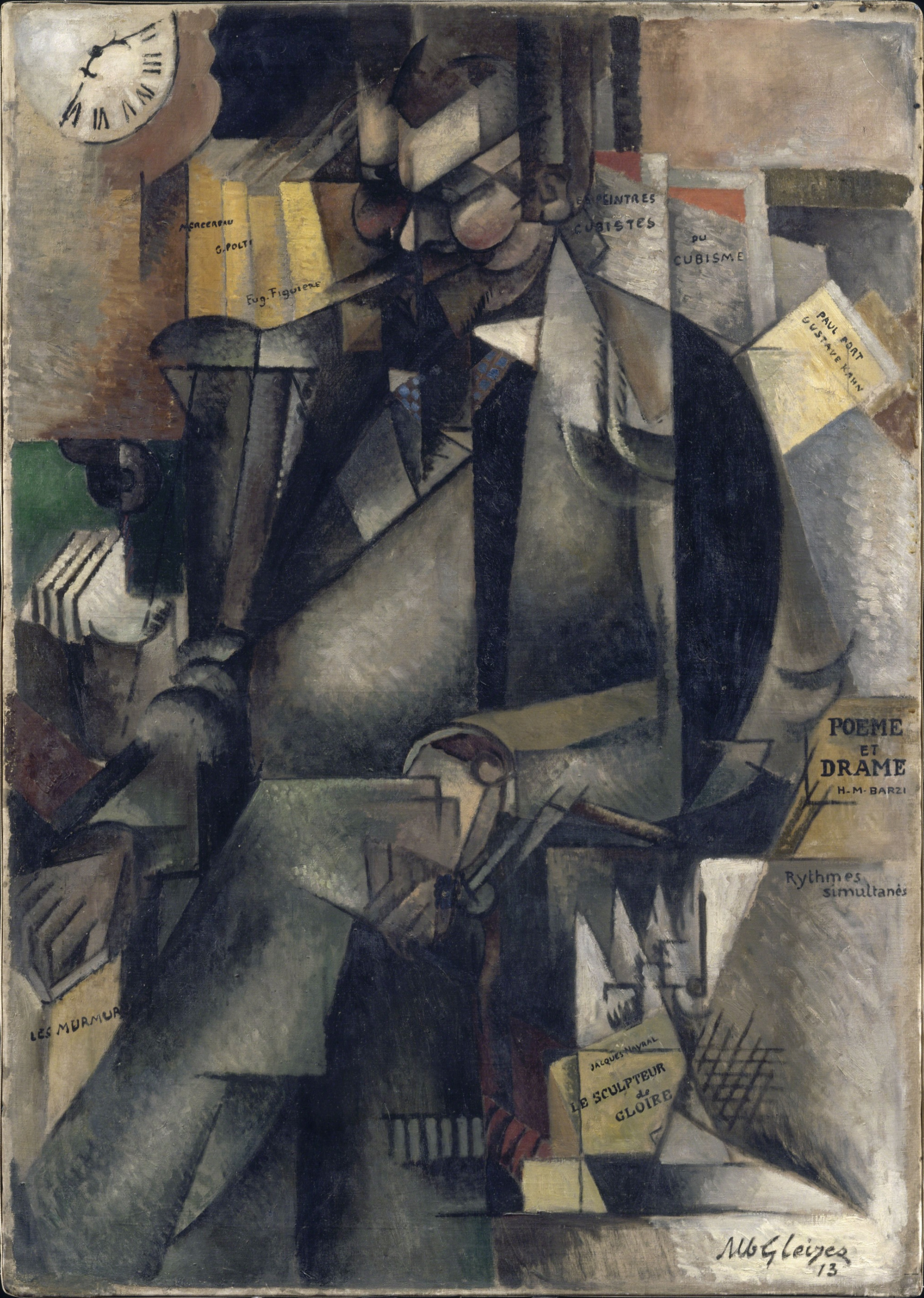
Albert Gleizes, 1913, Portrait de l’éditeur Eugène Figuière (The Publisher Eugene Figuiere), oil on canvas, 143.5 x 101.5 cm, Musée des Beaux-Arts de Lyon

Pablo Picasso, 1913–14, L'Homme aux cartes (Card Player), oil on canvas, 108 x 89.5 cm, Museum of Modern Art, New York

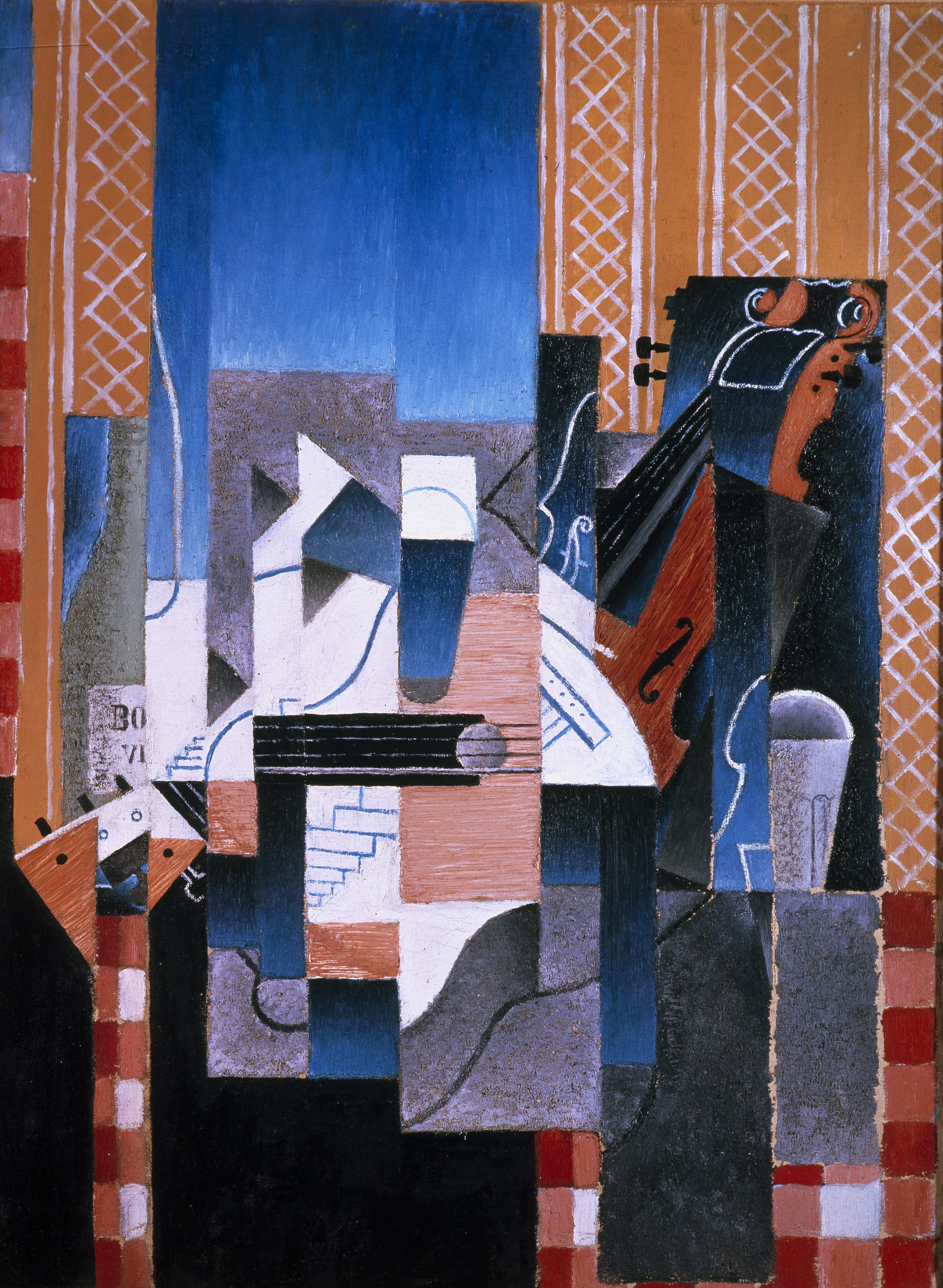
Juan Gris, 1913, Violon et guitare (Violin and Guitar), oil on canvas, 81 x 60 cm, Museo Nacional Centro de Arte Reina Sofía

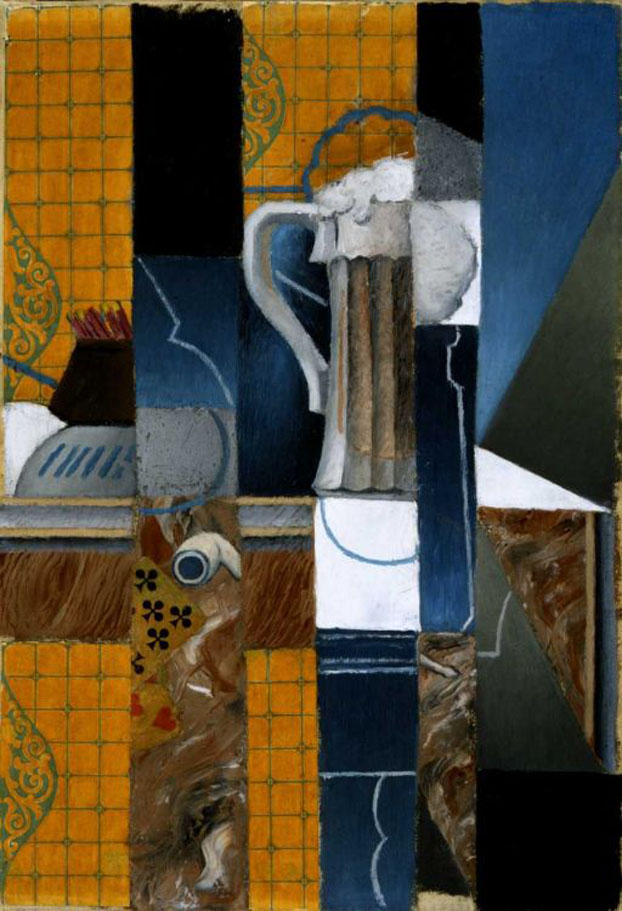
Juan Gris, 1913, Glass of Beer and Playing Cards, oil on canvas, 54.9 x 37.8 cm, Columbus Museum of Art

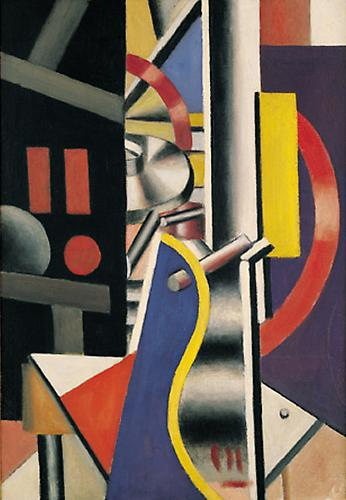
Fernand Léger, 1918, Dans L'Usine, oil on canvas, 56 x 38 cm (22 x 15 in), On the reverse titled Esquisse dans l'usine

Gino Severini, 1919, Bohémien Jouant de L'Accordéon (The Accordion Player), Museo del Novecento, Milan

== Exhibitions ==
- Moderni Umeni, S.V.U. Mánes, Prague, 1914
- Iowa City, The University of Iowa Museum of Art, Jean Metzinger in Retrospective, August 31–October 13, 1985, no. 38; traveled to Austin, Archer M. Huntington Art Gallery, University of Texas, November 2–December 28, 1985 (p. 53 of the catalogue), and Chicago, David and Alfred Smart Gallery, University of Chicago, January 18–September 3, 1986.
- New York, Sidney Janis Gallery, Selection of French Art 1906–1954, February 28–April 9, 1955.

== Literature ==
- Annual Report, Art Institute of Chicago, 1958
- Katharine Kuh, Modern art explained, Cory, Adams & Mackay, 1965
- Katharine Kuh, Break-up: The Core of Modern Art, New York Graphic Society, 1965
- James A. Speyer, Twentieth Century Painting and Sculpture, Apollo LXXIV, September 1966, p. 222.
- Painters of the Section D'Or: The Alternatives to Cubism. [Exhibition catalogue] September 27–October 22, 1967, Albright-Knox Art Gallery, Buffalo, New York, 1967

== Provenance ==
- Herwarth Walden, Galerie Der Sturm, Berlin, possibly acquired directly from Jean Metzinger [verso].
- Léonce Rosenberg Collection, Galerie l'Effort Moderne, by 1924 [See Verso Label].
- K.A. Legat, The Hague, the Netherlands [letter in curatorial file from Galerie Ariel].
- Galerie Ariel, Paris, 1953 [See letter in curatorial file].
- Sidney Janis Gallery, New York, early 1954 [see letter in curatorial file].
- Donated to the Art Institute by Mr and Mrs Sigmund W. Kunstadter, 1959.

== See also ==
- List of works by Jean Metzinger
