= Nebel =

Nebel is the German word for fog and astronomical nebulae. It is related to the Latin nebula. It may refer to:

Places

- Nebel, Germany, a municipality on the island of Amrum in Schleswig-Holstein
- The Nebel parish in Horsens Municipality in Denmark
- Nørre Nebel, the capital of Blaabjerg, in Ribe County, Denmark

Other

- Nebel (surname)
- Alois Nebel, Czech comic strip and film
- Nacht und Nebel, the Adolf Hitler edict of 1941
- Nebel or nabla, a Hebrew stringed instrument
- Nebel (river), in Mecklenburg-Vorpommern, Germany
- "Nebel", the last song on the Mutter album by the German band Rammstein
- Nebelwerfer, a World War II rocket artillery piece
