= Otto Nebel =

German painter

- Born: 25 December 1892; Berlin, Germany
- Died: 12 September 1973 (aged 80); Bern, Switzerland
- Known for: Painting, printmaking, artist's book, poetry, acting
- Movement: Der Sturm and Der Krater

Otto Nebel (25 December 1892 – 12 September 1973) was a German painter born in Berlin, Germany.

== Life ==
Nebel started his professional career 1909 in the field of building engineering. He took acting classes at the Lessingtheater in Berlin until 1914. His acting teachers were the famous Rudolf Blümner and Friedrich Kayssler. He wanted to give his debut at Stadttheater Haben when World War I broke out. Nebel spent the years of war on the German Eastern and Western Fronts. In 1918, during his 14-month war imprisonment in Colsterdale, England, he wrote his expressionistic poem Zuginsfeld condemning the war. In 1919, he returned to Berlin and became friends with Wassily Kandinsky, Paul Klee, Georg Muche, Kurt Schwitters, and their art. He joined the circle around Herwarth Walden and his wife Nell Walden. She initiated his collaboration at the Sturm gallery and the art school Der Sturm. Together with Hilla von Rebay und Rudolf Bauer he founded the artist group Der Krater in 1923. During this time he also worked for the magazine Der Sturm. Nebel married Hildegard Heitmeyer, the assistant of Gertrud Grunow, in 1924. He met Hildegard at the Bauhaus in Weimar. They stayed in Weimar until 1925 where they painted, wrote poems and acted. In 1933, when the National Socialists disparaged his work as degenerate art, he left Germany for Switzerland, first in Muntelier, and later in Bern. Nebel had financial problems because he was not allowed to work in Switzerland. Thanks to the effort of Kandinsky, he could regularly sell some of his paintings to the Solomon R. Guggenheim Foundation between 1936 and 1951. The German Federal Republic awarded Nebel the Order of Merit of the Federal Republic of Germany in 1965.

== Early work ==
The cutthroat reality he experienced during the First World War as young soldier and army reserve lieutenant influenced his wish to pursue an artistic career. Landmarks for making this decision were the commemorative exhibition for Franz Marc and Nebel's acquaintance with Herwarth Walden, whom he met in 1916 in Berlin. Walden provided an important platform for avant-garde approaches in art, literature, and music with both his Der Sturm gallery and the journal with the same name, and thereby greatly facilitated the breakthrough of expression.

Nebel's distressing experiences during the war is the central theme in his literary debut "Zuginsfeld" (1920). The 6,000-verse poem picks up the thread of August Stramm's poetry and the ensuing Der Sturm school while, however, exploring new paths. The literary collage depicts the mayhem of war by adopting its typical language. Associatively and playing with words, Nebel produced never-ending word chains using authentic word snippets from military orders, passwords and watchwords, headlines, folk songs, and from the language of the educated in Wilhelmine Germany. The satiric bite of the textual collage is visually manifest in the series of drawings for "Zuginsfeld", which he first executed in 1930. With barbed pen Nebel made caricatures in 50 pen-and-ink drawings of the military and other groups in society who, in his eyes, stirred up elation for the war. The grotesque figures are strongly reminiscent of the imagery used by Georg Grosz and Otto Dix.

War likewise impacted Nebel's work in that almost all of his pictorial oeuvre created prior to 1933 was destroyed in Berlin during the Second World War. Therefore, we know little of his early paintings, drawing, and prints. Nebel was in touch with well-known artists and writers during the disoriented post-war era of inflation. He lived in precarious conditions and, among other jobs, took on commissions in order to survive. (See the cover designed for Die Dame magazine of 1920.) He sought refuge in the utopia of art as the contrasting program to his dismal plight. In 1920, Nebel joined forces with Rudolf Bauer and Hilla von Rebay and formed the group Der Krater / Das Hochamt der Kunst ("The crater / The high mass of art"). The three artists shared the view that painting should be purely non-figurative, zeroing in on artistic experience and emotions. The notion that the revolution of modern art could also lead to a wished-for transformation of society linked them to other avant-garde groups of artists and writers. Even if the group did not stay together long, the ideas it pursued remained fundamental for Nebel's work.

== Runic fugues and runic flags ==
Nebel executed them for his poem "Unfeig" (1924/1925), which is a pivotal work for his notions about the alphabet. He called the poem a runic fugue. In "Unfeig", as in his other runic fugue "Das Rad der Titanen" (1926/1957), he used only nine or twelve letters of the alphabet.

The Runen-Fahnen ("Runic Flags") are optical scores that visualize the interplay between individual letters of the alphabet and their various facets. Analogous to the fugue in music, in the runic fugues the vowels and the consonants chosen at the beginning determine the "theme", which is continually repeated and transformed by expansion, reduction, and inversion. Nebel's goal in reduction and concentration of linguistic material was to create a contrasting language to hackneyed everyday language and its rational use. He wrote, "The miseducated people of our times are deaf to words and blind to images. They do not hear what they read. What they write, they cannot see." Nebel believed that he regained the directness lying hidden behind the conventions of language in individual words and letters of the alphabet. With format larger than man-size, the Runen-Fahnen intimate that the whole body should participate in reading.

The Runen-Fahnen are a fourfold visual representation of the original beginning of the text:

Runic Flag 1 displays the wording in a typography invented by Nebel. Runic Flags 2–4, in turn, replace Latin characters with another system of signs and thereby break with habitual perception. The individual letters of the alphabet can no longer be overlooked. Runic Flag 2 records sounds by allocating each one a special form and color affiliated to its specific qualities. Runic Flag 3 takes on the level of characters, which we become aware of as graphic unities and forms by means of alienation. Runic Flag 4 combines both aforementioned aspects. Nebel understood characters or runes as independent linguistic entities whose sound or acoustic and visual dimensions were the key part of an artwork. The runic fugues, however, represent an experimental search for the "inner sound" (Kandinsky) of words and letters, their impact on the emotions. Although the fragments of Uns, unser, Er sie Es (1922) are to be read as preliminary attempts that culminated in the runic fugues, they nevertheless have a very independent and distinct quality. In the original single sheets that were bound together to make the book, Nebel drafted an ABC using painted geometric symbols. On these folios he attempted, at least partly, to find a correspondence between characters and sounds. The artist reworded them later into collages of paper cuttings, making extremely short poems. These works underscore the parity between word and image in his work, between literary and visual forms of expression. His legacy of manuscripts gives insight into the writing process behind the runic fugues and gives a palpable impression of how content is dependent on language.

== "Musical" works ==
Even before Nebel "officially" gave up using representational visual language he created a number of non-objective works, which often had titles taken from music terminology: Animato, Dopio movimento, 'ondo con brio gai or Con Tenerezza. They were produced during the 1930s, some during his sojourns in Italy. Nebel compared his endeavors with those of an orchestra conductor who "rehearses" a score with an orchestra. These works herald his non-objective work.

This is very much what Wassily Kandinsky had in mind in his trailblazing book Concerning the Spiritual in Art: "Musical sound acts directly on the soul and finds an echo there because, though to varying extents, music is innate in man." With increasing tendencies to abstraction, Kandinsky too referred to music and sought to express emotions - analogous to writing scores - with colors and forms in his Compositions, Improvisations, and Impressions.

Nebel untiringly demanded of spectators that they open themselves up to the "resonating tons" of the pictures they view. Nebel asserted, "My painting is poetry, the sister of my linguistic art. Where language ends is where the runic order of symbols begins."

== Bavaria and Ascona ==
Around 1926 to 1928 Nebel was often in the Bavarian village of Kochel, not far from Murnau. He loved to regularly visit Ascona in Switzerland as well. In Kochel he founded a wallpaper factory and met with much adversity and red tape, forcing him very soon to give up the experiment. He produced numerous wallpaper designs at the time, and was able to utilize them repeatedly for his collages at later dates. During his stay in Kochel he often went on hikes in search of motifs in the Bavarian countryside. The artist commented on his colorful drawings from this period in the following words: "The strangeness of the composition is to be understood humorously. The images are such that belong in children's souls. They may be kept protected under galls on small round tables that can be revolved at will. Then mums can take their darlings for a walk around the countryside of Kochel and tell fairytales. They only have to read the story that Uncle Painter has laid down there." Thus are the instructions that Nebel gave to "read" his "colorful and bright compositions" of this period.

Later in the 1920s he returned periodically to Ascona. There he painted intensely colorful scenes with a southern flair (such as Aus Losone ("From Losone") or Ascona-Lido. The town in the Ticino region had a strongly Italian flair and was a key attraction for many avant-garde artists. Among those he met there was, and they planned to start a painting school together (Cavallo rosso). He was additionally invited to exhibit in Ascona together with the artist's group Der grosse Bär. The group comprised artists such as Marianne von Werefkin and the founder of the group, Walter Helbling.

== Italy / Arcadia ==
Italy was an eternal magnet for Nebel. During a three-month stay in 1931, he compiled his Farben-Atlas von Italien ("Italian color atlas"). It was to be the essential basis for many future pictorial compositions. In his explanations on the pages opposite the individual plates, the artist added remarks on the overall ambience of the respective views. The greater the variety of color and the more conspicuous the "resonance", the more generously he calculated the geometrical figures and the colored rectangles. He also "portrayed" the objects by their color-values and "sounds" - whether it was paint on house walls or fishing boats, whether olive or pine groves, mountain ranges or beaches. Ultimately, Nebel compiled a "psycho-historical" catalogue by classifying certain colors according to personal optical impressions, and with the resulting scales he laid the basis for his future work.

How important the color atlas would be for the artist from now on when he was designing or composing pictures can be not only seen in works such as Rivoli, Pompejanisches ("Pompeian"), Camogli, Recco or Arkadisches ("Arcadian"), but already in the sheets Siena I to III. As a former construction expert, he was often greatly taken by architectural aspects. In Siena the earthen colors of the brick buildings dominate. They are interwoven by rhythmic accents - of light and shade, rust-red and olive-green. On the other hand, all sorts of variations blue and gray dominate in the works in which he took the atlas plates of Florence to hand (Toscanische Stadt/Tuscan City, 1932), the city in which the artist repeatedly took refuge in the future. The works that are related to Florence are especially full of allusions to architectural motifs and colorful flashes, and infused with the city's characteristic bright light. After going into exile, Nebel interpreted both building motifs and landscapes through the lens of the Farben-Atlas ("Color Atlas").

== Abstraction and the non-objective ==
The artistic freedom he experienced after leaving Germany in 1933 allowed him to increasingly turn away from representational painting. The gallerist Jeanne Bucher played a role in this transformation in his art. Nebel met her in April 1937 in Paris. She had several artists representing the "new art" in her program, and among them was Wassily Kandinsky. Thus Nebel had contact to the cosmopolitan group Abstraction-Création (Incidents in Light Yellow, Suspended, Happy, all 1937). In 1938, Nebel first officially used the term "non-objective" in his work catalogue, and among such pieces classified in this way is work number "U2", Animato. As early as 1936 onwards, he was able to sell works to the newly founded "Museum of Non-Objective Painting" in New York, that is, to the institution that is now the Guggenheim Museum. Nebel's connections to this museum were of fundamental importance to him, because from 1933 – in exile in Bern – he was without a work permit. He had especially Kandinsky's recommendation to thank for the Guggenheim's support, as well as the goodwill of his friend from his first years in Berlin, Hilla von Rebay, who was the initiator and administrator of the Guggenheim Foundation. This generous and continuous support continued during the Second World War and lasted until 1951. Today, 36 works of art by Nebel dating from 1936 to 1948 still belong to the Guggenheim Museum collection in New York. Others have been sold in the meantime.

That Nebel, after the mid-1930s, explored abstract painting more intensively is linked to a present he received from his wife Hilda at Christmas in 1935: an edition of the I Ching: Book of Changes.

== The Near East Series ==
The whole work comprises sixty large-format sheets. In 1962, Nebel travelled by boat to the Near East via Dubrovnik and Mykonos to Istanbul, Sochi, and Bursa. The drawings optically resemble Arabic or Cyrillic characters and, to a great extent, are executed on gray or black "imperial-quality paper". Nebel considered them to be visual runic narratives that were closely related to his literary texts.

== Early portfolio artworks and series ==
In 1929 he executed four portfolio artworks. They were conceived as a crossover between text and image, whereby the image was mostly created first, and the text subsequently captured thoughts and observations on the respective work. The initial outlines in pen or pencil are partially visible under the colored pencil drawing.

It is only the first series Karneval (Carnival) that has no text; presumably in this case Nebel did not deem a corresponding text necessary. A masked ball that took place in Berlin on 9 February 1929, was the inspiration for the carnival atmosphere Nebel presents in a kaleidoscope of imagery and movement. In total, the artist opens up 26 windows for spectators, through which they can view brightly colored figures and clowns wearing masks as they drift past. Some of them have an eerie appearance.

== Artist's relationships ==
While on leave from the war in Berlin, Nebel visited the commemorative exhibition at Der Sturm Gallery for Franz Marc, who was killed in the war on 4 March 1916. Thus this pivotal artist came to his notice and was henceforth much admired. In Herwarth Walden he met a patron of the arts who later opened up options for exhibitions and publishing. Walden's wife at the time, the Swedish artist Nell Roslund-Walden, ran into Nebel again decades later in Bern, and an old friendship was renewed.

In 1922 Moholy-Nagy exhibited for the first time in Der Sturm Gallery. The two artists met again in 1928 in Ascona, where especially Marianne von Werefkin had become close friends with Nebel. Later Nebel corresponded in particular with Lothar Schreyer and Georg Muche. They had become acquainted at Der Sturm Gallery, and all three sought to restore the missing metaphysical dimensions of art. Nebel felt rapport with Albert Gleizes too. In 1935, he received a letter from him in which Gleizes confirmed their artistic affinity: "Nous sommes sur les memes voies, occupies des memes recherches."

In the heyday of Der Sturm, Wassily Kandinsky was seen as someone who revitalized art and was a guiding star for many artists. A large segment of Nebel's work found its way into the Guggenheim Collection in New York through Kandinsky's and Hilla von Rebay's support. Kandinsky and Nebel exchanged a wealth of letters and thereby left ample proof of their friendship.

== Technical diversity ==
The artist liked to experiment especially with the linocut, a great favorite among the German Expressionists and a medium that they imbued with new life. After contributing to Der Sturm journal in the early 1920s he began to work with this printing technique again, in particular in 1936, and produced the 7-series Gastgeschenk in Schwarz-Weiss ("Hospitality gift in black-and-white"), a self-contained series of 210 linocuts - some of them almost miniatures - presenting a fusion of his hitherto art and form vocabulary. The subject matter of his linocuts follows the repertoire of his colored works on paper and sketches as well as paintings, and occasionally they explore paths for developing entirely new genres. Nebel produced linocuts continually alongside his other work. The medium opened up new and diverse avenues of expression. Again and again he returned to this technique and experimented with different kinds of linoleum and various layers of colors. In this way he achieved a multilayer print very similar to the effect he strived for in his other pictures, that is, to achieve an airy spatial effect. He included cuttings from his linocuts in his papiers collés and collages. In them he also utilized his Kochel wallpapers. Nebel also regularly experimented with "reverse glass painting". This form of art he discovered during a stay in Upper Bavaria, where it was very popular for devotional and votive pictures. Late in life he started to explore this technique again and produced spirited and colorful abstract compositions on glass panels.

== Summary ==
A reminiscence and summary by Kate T. Steinitz of Artforum Los Angeles:

"When I read the name Otto Nebel on the window of the Raboff Gallery I heard the echo of voice of long ago. I never forgot the sound. I had heard it in a dark street in Berlin in the 1920s. First it was a solo recital, then there were two voices; they belonged to a middle-sized man and a tall man, Otto Nebel and Kurt Schwitters. They were followed by a dozen friends, mainly artists. We all came from a party after a party, or from a cafe house after the opening of an exhibition, or was it a recital after a recital in the Sturm Gallery? I do not remember, but I still hear the noise in the dark street, both painter-poets without inhibition shouting, screaming, howling. There were puns and jokes with bitter meaning under the surface. Nebel recited fragments from this epic 'Zug-ins-Feld' – March-to-War – a true story of his own terrifying experience. He recited war-injured, mutilated sentences; sentences which were hit by gunfire and broken into words, single words of protest, bleeding into sounds.

"Nebel had become a poet and a painter during four years of military war duty plus 14 months in an English prisoner-of-war camp. His successful career as an architect and architectural engineer had been bluntly interrupted. However, the stream of his imagination and his urge to create could not be stopped. Restricted in movement by military duties, he was under continuous pressure. The steam of his protest had to find an outlet in words and pictorial forms. Immediately after his return from war, Nebel joined Herwarth Walden's avant-garde group 'Der Sturm'. From that time he collaborated on the journal Der Sturm, exhibited in the Sturm Gallery and performed at the Sturm recitals. Kurt Schwitters joined the group about the same time. That night, in the Berlin side-street, Nebel's fiery, meaningful words and Schwitters' deliberately non-sensical words and sounds exploded like fireworks. We were lucky that no policeman interfered. Both Schwitters and Nebel were used to loud and emphatic talk at the performances in the Sturm Gallery. These recitals were not soft-spoken. Schwitters, Nebel and the other performers had to keep up with Rudolph Bluemner, the great master of the spoken word, who had abandoned the stage in order to join Herwarth Walden as writer, critic and performer at the Sturm. The Sturm-wind in the Potsdamerstrasse actually became a hurricane, ravaging syntax and grammar, atomizing sentences. Subjects and predicates with their appended clauses exploded in the air, the most radical over Zurich in 1916, when Hugo Ball recited poems of mere syllables without meaning, assembled from the debris of words for their mere sound value. Destructive tendencies, as it appeared to the public? Or, as Gertrude Stein later explained her own disconnected language: '... Breaking the paragraph down and everything down to commence again with not connecting with the daily anything and really to choose something.'

"Nebel chose the expressive power of the word; rhythm and meaning combined in staccato sentences, in fragments of dialogue, evoking situations but not describing. Words that hit and words laid open the decay under well-masked appearances. The "Zug-ins-Feld" epic appeared in many continuations in the Sturm of 1920–1921. At the time of the recitals in the Sturm Gallery the walls trembled under explosions of anger and protest. The Sturm artists believed in their go; they were moralists within their own laws of morality. They condemned the bloody mass-murder of war, but with their pens, their brushes and their voices they killed armies of writers, artists, critics of other artistic and philosophical creeds. They attacked hypocrisy and compromise; they preferred to disturb and to frighten their audience more than to please it. That this happened in the halls of an art gallery was not accidental. The search for a new art of the world was to a great extent carried by painter-poets and painter-musicians. Arnold Schoenberg at that time was a painter of the Sturm movement.

"Nebel is hardly known in the United States. He was not at all known to the West Coasts before the exhibition of s small selection of this paintings in the Raboff Gallery. Ernest Raboff had discovered them in the Simone Heller Gallery in Paris, and was fascinated by the beauty and harmony in the thematic wealth of abstract composition and by the elaborate execution. In fact they evoked a harmonic music of the spheres rather than the fortissimo of Nebel's voice of protest in Berlin in the 1920s.

"Nebel is a classic to the abstract movement in painting. Immediately after his return from the war he joined Kandinsky, Klee and Schwitters in their concept of art. They remained lifelong friends. One cannot deny that some of Nebel's paintings have a family likeness to Klee and Kandinsky, but in the way Gris' and Braque's cubist paintings have a family likeness to those of Picasso of the same period. This is caused by the same spiritual concept, certainly not by dependence or imitation. Nebel, like Klee and Schwitters, limits himself to small formats in contrast to the giant formats of the present-day American school. On his small surface, varying in airy colors as the sky at sunset or dawn, orbit clearly defined shapes or bodies, circles, rods, squares and star-like balls and quick-moving serpentine lines. All sorts of constellations seem to move in controlled order. Other paintings give the feeling of stability by the equilibrium of geometrical forms. There is nothing accidental, no painterly blur. Nebel is neither a spontaneous action painter, nor a primitive. He knows his craft, based upon a sound knowledge of color theories. One painting has areas of grey which receive a noble quality from the optical division of color. Small regular dots of complementary colors, placed side by side, according to Seurat's principle, mix in the spectator's eye to the fine grey of clouds, non-figurative, words into forms.

"The precise brushstroke, the jewel-like finish of each dot, line and form caused some critics to classify Nebel as a mere craftsman, a jeweller or enamel artist stepping out into painting. But for Nebel, as for Kandinsky and Klee, art is the visible expression of spiritual concepts. Each work of art, says Nebel, is an image of the artist's mental development and transformation. The most elaborate craftsmanship is just good enough to give shape to inspired and enlightened vision. Means and mediums should be used in harmony with the creative process.

"They are precious and almost sacred as they have to make a revelation visible. The artist must combine visual ability with intelligence of interpretation. Nebel expresses his idealistic philosophy of art in dithyrambic sentences, which defy direct literary translation, in a book with 24 reproductions of his paintings, drawings and prints: "Worte zu Bildern" (Words to Images). (Six of these pictures are among 100 works in the possession of the Guggenheim Museum in New York; S. H. Guggenheim was a sponsor of Nebel through many hard years). Out of the expressionist free form of his postwar epic he progressed to rigorous studies of language to intensify his medium. The result was introduction of musical form of the Fugue into poetry.

"Nebel was not the only one who used forms in his literary work; James Joyce, also early in the 20th century, experimented with musical forms in his "Ulysses", e.g., in the episode of the Sirens, where he made a rather free use of the fugue. His intellectual variations of words depend on most complex associations. His boundless growth of linguistic flowers has its roots in the swamp of our civilization. Nebel searched for, and found, an archetype of expression in a so-far-undiscovered world of forms. Nebel's Fugues are unique through a self-imposed discipline. In order to intensify the power of the word he concentrated on words composed of 9 letters of the alphabet only for his first Fugue, "Unfeig" (Brave) and of 12 letters for the second Fugue, "Das Rad der Titanen" (The Wheel of the Titans). He explains this attempt to counteract the lack of expression in the outworn language of our time.

"Unfeig Oblong Format standing like trees. To associate Nebel's return to runic characters with romantic, Wagnerian, or worse, Hitlerian, Teutonism would be a misunderstanding of his purpose, the search of simplicity. There is more and deeper affinity to pictorial values in his literary work. Nebel designed the book "Unfeig" in an oblong format. The poems stand like trees, upright. As a painter he transposes the letters into small colored squares on the last folding leaf of his book. Nebel at the completion of his 70th year looks back upon an oeuvre of 7000 leaves of drawings and series of drawings, 2000 painted and graphic leaves, 200 paintings, many unpublished books and writings, several printed books. (Forthcoming is "Die Goldene Spur", The Golden Track, Arcade Press.) At the present time, another book is forthcoming, small of format, but great significance. It is the Fugue of 12 runic characters, "das Rad der Titanen" (The Wheel of the Titans). Twelve letters of the alphabet have the power to roll a gigantic wheel of meaning over a new world in gestation.

"'The myth of creation in the 20th century', in the words of Lothar Schreyer, 'not a repetition of old myths, but Ur-Bilder, prime images, shaped by the impact of the 20th century'."

== Sound recordings ==
- "Zuginsfeld. Expressionistische Dichtung zur Ächtung des Krieges, gesprochen von Otto Nebel, aufgenommen in Bern 1972 (rec. Bern 300772)
- "Expressionistische Dichter des Sturms - Otto Nebel spricht: August Stramm, Kurt Schwitters, Otto Nebel; rec. Wien 1962; Amadeo AVRS 2060. Listen to it on: www.ottonebel.org

== Literature ==
- Otto Nebel, Maler und Dichter «Zur Unzeit gegeigt...», herausgegeben von Therese Bhattacharya-Stettler, Steffan Biffiger, Bettina Braun, mit Beiträgen von Therese Bhattacharya-Stettler, Steffan Biffiger, Bettina Braun, Götz-Lothar Darsow, Dolores Denaro, Andreas Mauz, Anna M. Schafroth und Anja Schlegel, Kunstmuseum Bern, Otto Nebel-Stiftung, Bern, Kerber Verlag, Bielefeld 2012, ISBN 3866786956, ISBN 978-3866786950, 360 pages, German
- Bhattacharya-Stettler, Therese: Otto Nebel. - Bern: Benteli, 1982. - ISBN 3-7165-0410-6
- Liebmann, Kurt: Der Malerdichter Otto Nebel : ein Beitrag zur Philosophie der modernen Kunst. - Zürich: Orell Füssli, 1935
- Otto-Nebel-Stiftung: Otto Nebel. - Bern, 1990
- Therese Bhattacharya-Stettler: "Otto Nebel" In:. Andreas Kotte (ed.) Theatre Dictionary of Switzerland. band 2 Chronos, Zürich 2005, ISBN 3-0340-0715-9, S. 1311 f. Chronos, Zurich 2005, ISBN 3-0340-0715-9, pp. 1311 f
- Karl Epstein: L'Art poétique, ou l'influence de l'esprit de Klee, avec Bissière Didonet Klee Nebel Reichel Steffens Wols. Charles Epstein: L'Art poétique, ou l'influence de l'esprit de Klee, avec Bissière Didonet Clover Mist Reichel Steffens wolf. Poetic Art Edition, Clarens 1995, S. 12, S. 95–117 Poetic Art Edition, Clarens 1995, pp. 12, 95–117
- Kurt Liebmann: The painter poet Otto Nebel: a contribution to the philosophy of modern art. Orell Füssli, Zürich 1935 Orell Füssli, Zurich 1935
- Otto Nebel, Ekkehard Eickhoff: Storm and completion. Ein Lebensbild von Otto Nebel . A Biography of Otto Nebel. As a Festschrift for his 80th Geburtstag. Zürich 1972 Arcade Press, Zurich 1972
- Otto-Nebel-Stiftung (Hrsg.): Otto Nebel. Otto Nebel. Bern in 1990
