= Zuginsfeld =

Expressionist poem by Otto Nebel

"Zuginsfeld" is an expressionist, satirical poem by Otto Nebel. The poem covers over 6,000 verses and is divided into twenty-three sections. The content is divided into two parts. The first part covers the structure of the military and the second part discusses the Thirty Years' War. The poem is a condemnation of war and the society that produces it.

== Creation ==
Nebel wrote the first two versions of "Zuginsfeld" in 1918 during his fourteen-month stay as a prisoner-of-war at the English prison camp Colsterdale (Yorkshire) during World War I. It was published in installments by the magazine Der Sturm between 1920 and 1923.

== Contents ==
The main theme of "Zuginsfeld" is the horror of war and the subsequent arousal of intellectual and artistic appeal. Special loathing attests to language, which has become a lie.

"Zuginsfeld" is divided into two main parts and 23 sections. Part one starts with the structure of the military. The sections are titled as follows:

- "The Congregation" (Section I)
- "The Corporal" (Section II)
- "The Sergeant" (Section III)
- "Chamber Sergeant" (Section IV)
- "Writer" (Section V)
- "Military Music" (Section VI)
- "Army Doctor" (Section VII)
- "Lieutenant" (Section VIII)
- "Captain" (Section IX)
- "Colonel" (Section XI)
- "General" (Section XII)
- "Exercises" (Section XIII)
- "Alp" (Section XIV)
- "Kaiser Wilhelm" (Section XV)

Part two begins with "The War Breaks Out" (Section XVI), and continues with the theme of the war until "Help!" (Section XXIII), a cry without an answer that ends the work. The poem spans the length of the Thirty Years' War, from the pre-war days to just after the war's end.

== Allusions ==
The title of the work, "Zuginsfeld", is an allusion to Springinsfeld, the antihero from Grimmelshausen's work Der seltsame Springinsfeld.

== Language and style ==
In "Zuginsfeld", phrases and comments are displayed side by side. The poem is characterized by strings of words that are interrupted abruptly in some places. "Zuginsfeld" begins by quoting a patriotic phrase: "Military strength in the Spirit". Immediately Nebel asks the critical question: who will vouch for that? The answer is "the Man". According to the interpretation of René Radrizzani, in the next lines the man is manipulated as a subject and uniformed. "Zuginsfeld" also contains puns, such as "Conscription: vulgarity in space!", "Kaffir gossip - coffee battle", "thief homeland retired", and "right to vote". According to Radrizzani, the language holds the world language of the poem as whole, exposing the fog phrases and company's lies.

== In other media ==
In 1970, a radio play was produced, with Nebel's participation. In 1972, a recording of a reading was recorded by Nebel in Basel.

== Sources ==
- Zuginsfeld: Graphic Images of Otto Nebel (1930). The Swiss Federal Archives Berne; Lit Bhattacharya-Stettler, Therese Otto Nebel. Benteli, Bern 1982, ISBN 3-7165-0410-6 .
- Rene Radrizzani (ed.): Otto Nebel, The Poetic Work: Zuginsfeld, Unfeig, The Wheel of the Titans <vol. 1-3>. Edition Text + Kritik, Munich, 1979, ISBN 3-921402-64-6
- Mader, Helmut. "The father of concrete poetry?". Die Zeit.
