= Nell Walden =

Swedish painter, art collector, and writer

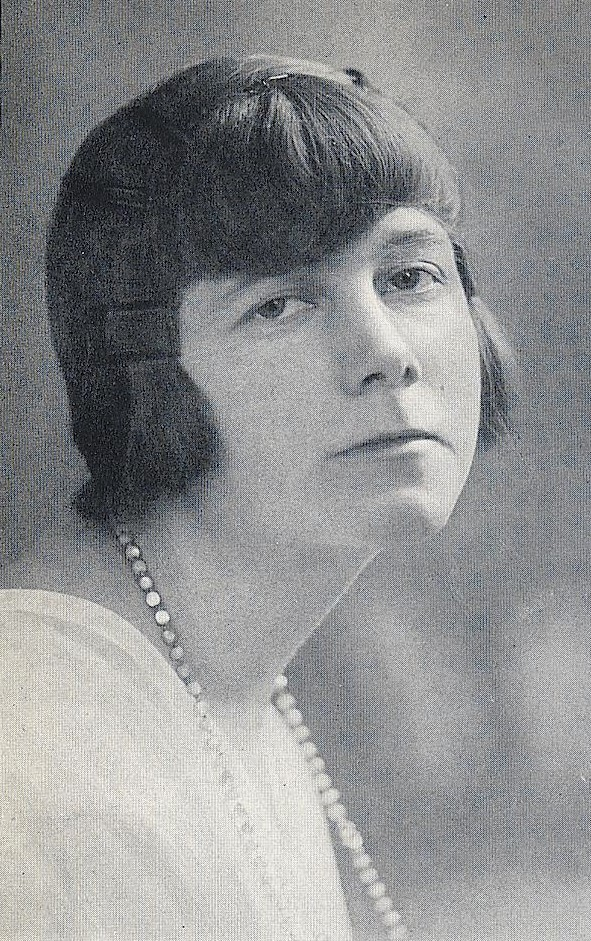
- Nell Walden in 1918
- Born: Nelly Anna Charlotta Roslund; 29 December 1887; Karlskrona, Sweden
- Died: 21 October 1975 (aged 87); Bern, Switzerland
- Other name: Marja Enid
- Occupations: Painter; art collector; writer
- Spouses: Herwarth Walden (1912–1924); Hans Heimann (1926–1933); Hannes Urech (married 1940)

Nelly Anna Charlotta Walden (née Roslund; 29 December 1887 – 21 October 1975) was a Swedish painter, art collector, and writer. A key figure in the activities of Berlin-based avant-garde magazine Der Sturm, Walden was a pioneer of abstract art and was married to German writer Herwarth Walden.

== Early life ==
Nell Walden was born in Karlskrona, Sweden, on 29 December 1887 into a clerical Scanian family. Her father Frithiof Roslund was a military preacher, and her mother Hilda Smith came from an affluent Scottish family. Walden had four younger siblings: Ruth, Lotti, Hilda, and Karl. The family moved to Landskrona in 1903, where Walden's father became the vicar. Walden stayed with her grandparents in Trelleborg, where she attended the Trelleborg Elementarskola för Flickor. She graduated in 1904 and entered a school in Lund to study music. She received language lessons in Lübeck during the summer of 1907, and in 1908, she graduated with a degree in organ in Växjö. The following year, she moved to Berlin with her sister, to study music. In 1910, Walden became engaged to Folke Bensow, an architect. After a year, the couple called off their engagement.

== Married life and artistic career ==
In 1911, Walden met German writer, musician, and publisher Herwarth Walden (born Georg Lewin) in Landskrona. They married in London on 23 November 1912. Walden became an imperative figure of Der Sturm (The Storm), a Berlin-based weekly journal founded by her husband in 1910, and its international network of artists who were then mostly obscure, progressive, and at times radical. Walden became deeply involved in the expansion of Der Sturm, encompassing a theatre, an art school, a bookstore, and an art gallery. Together with her husband, Walden ran the art gallery in Berlin, which was highly influential at the time. The gallery was a leading exhibition forum for avant-garde movements such as Expressionism, Futurism, Cubism, and Constructivism in Germany during the 1910s and 1920s. In 1913, the couple travelled to several European cities to meet modern artists and collect works for the exhibition Erster Deutscher Herbstsalon, which opened under the auspices of Der Sturm in September of the same year. The exhibition featured around 360 works of art of nearly 80 artists including, Wassily Kandinsky, Gabriele Münter, Sonia Delaunay-Terk, Umberto Boccioni, Marc Chagall, Jacoba van Heemskerck, and Paul Klee. Between 1912 and 1923, she was involved in the production of several exhibitions, and the establishment and management of international contacts.

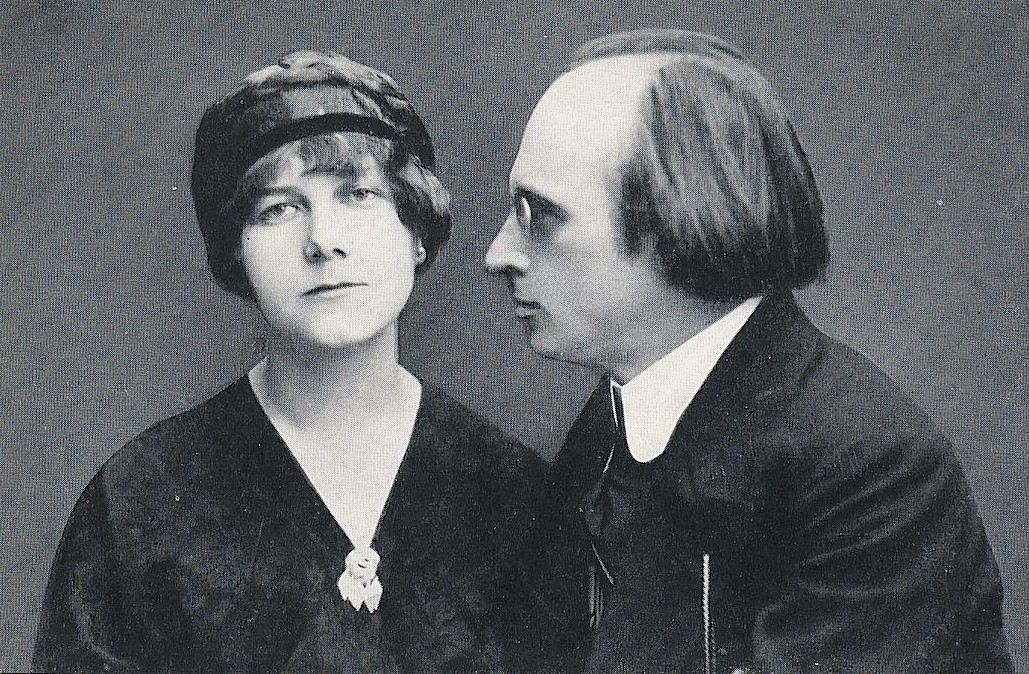
Walden with her husband Herwarth Walden in 1915.

During World War I, Walden worked as a translator and journalist, contributing articles in Swedish newspapers on the German cultural scene. Funds from her publications were used to support the activities of Der Sturm which was struggling financially at the time.

Walden started her artistic career in 1915, making art on paper, reverse glass paintings, and working with oil. Her earliest paintings show that she drew inspiration from Swedish folk art. Her artwork included abstract compositions, with emphasis on human and geometric forms, and occasional sketches of landscapes, greenery, and nature. Most of her paintings during that time were watercolour compositions, tempera, gouache, and pastels on paper. She also experimented with different techniques, such as sgraffito, mosaics, and collages, and painted ceramics, furniture, and book covers. In 1916, Walden began her formal study of art as a student of the Der Sturm art school in Berlin.

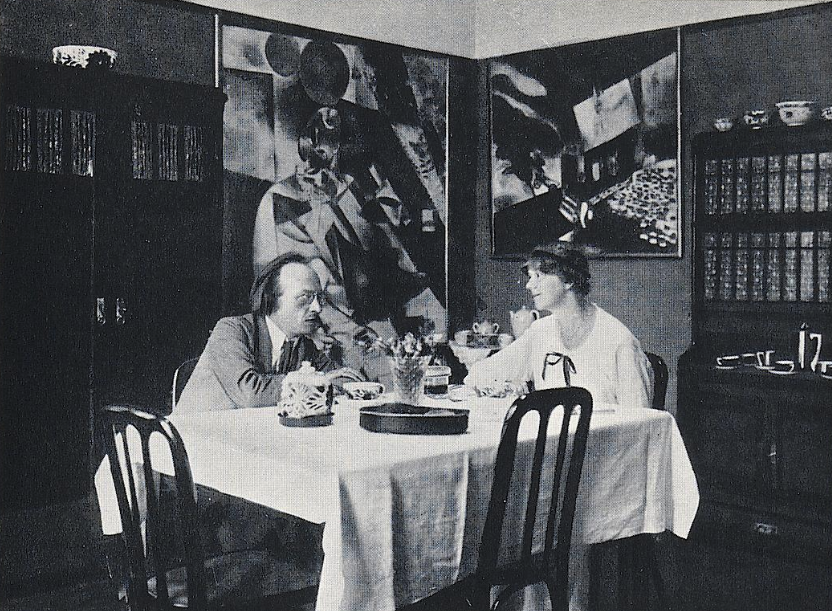
Walden with her husband Herwarth Walden at their apartment in Berlin in 1916

Walden's artistic career was extremely productive. Her works were first exhibited at the Der Sturm gallery in Berlin in July 1916. The same year, her paintings were also featured during international touring exhibitions. Between 1916 and 1925, she frequently exhibited her works at the Der Sturm gallery in Berlin, and during the magazine's touring exhibitions across several European nations. Her paintings raised interest and Walden gained more appreciation for her art. Walden was regarded as "the first abstract painter in Swedish history".

In 1924, Walden and her husband divorced, following which she parted ways with Der Sturm. In 1926, Walden married Hans Heimann, and turned her interest towards ethnographic artifacts. The same year, she was elected as a member of the association Die Abstrakten – Internationale Vereinigung der Expressionisten, Futuristen, Kubisten und Konstruktivisten e.V. and her works were frequently shown at the annual exhibition Große Berliner Kunstausstellung. In 1927, Walden held a solo exhibition at Galerie Albert Flechtheim where nearly fifty of her compositions were featured. Her collection of enthnographic pieces were displayed at the Musée d'ethnographie de Genève in 1929.

Although Walden is arguably best known as an artist, she was also a writer and published poetry under the pseudonym Marja Enid. In 1933, Felix Stössinger published a collection of Walden's poems entitled Unter Sternen. The same year, Walden divorced Heimann, and moved to Switzerland. In 1940, she married Swiss teacher Hannes Urech.

== Later years ==
After World War II, Walden focused on preserving the legacy of Der Sturm and her first husband Herwarth Walden, publishing two memoirs: Der Sturm. Ein Erinneringsbuch an Herwarth Walden und die Künstler aus dem Sturmkreis (1954) and Herwarth Walden. Ein Lebensbild (1963).

Walden was recognised for her contributions to art. She was honoured with the Order of Vasa in 1967 and the Order of Merit of the Federal Republic of Germany in 1968. She was also awarded a silver medal from the Accademia Internazionale Tommaso Campanella in 1970.

Walden died in Bern, Switzerland, on 21 October 1975.
