= Georg Schrimpf =

German painter and artist (1889–1938)

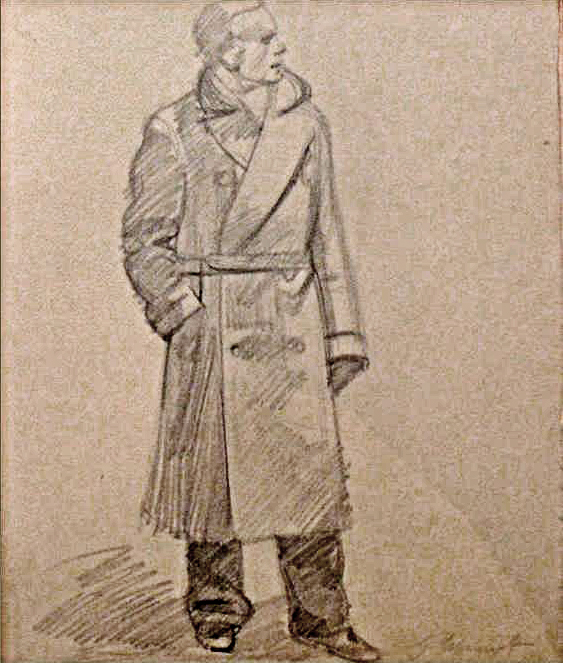
Man With A Long Coat, Georg Schrimpf's self-portrait (drawing on paper, 32 x 38 cm), private collection

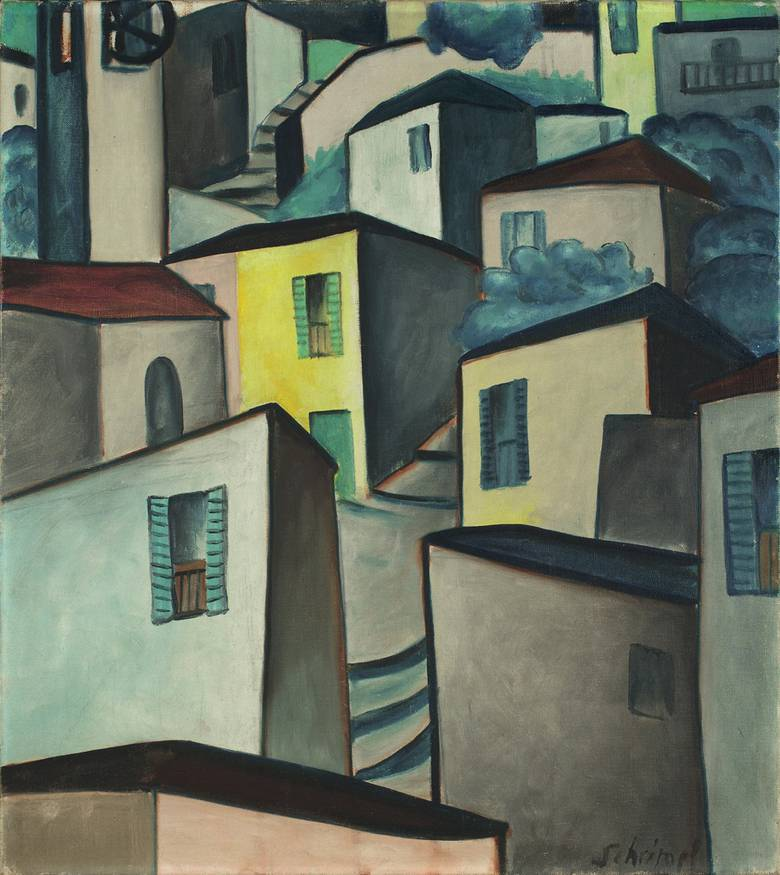
Porto Ronco, 1917 (oil on canvas, 66 x 59 cm), private collection, Germany

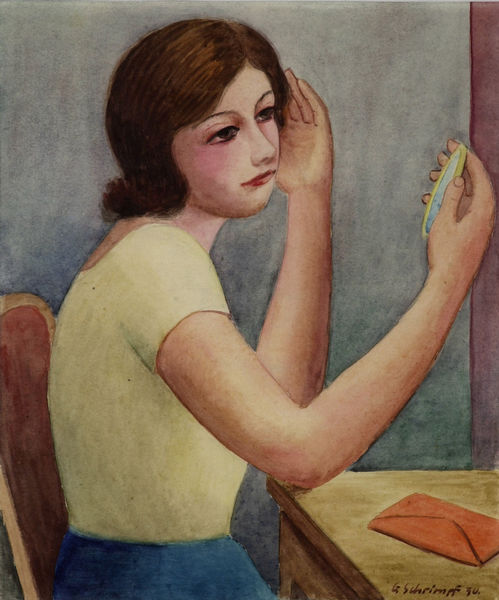
Girl with mirror, 1930 (watercolor, 29 x 25 cm), private collection, Germany

Georg Schrimpf (13 February 1889 – 19 April 1938) was a German painter and graphic artist. Along with Otto Dix, George Grosz and Christian Schad, Schrimpf is broadly acknowledged as a main representative of the art movement Neue Sachlichkeit (usually translated New Objectivity), which developed, in Weimar Germany, from 1919 to 1933, as an outgrowth of Expressionism. Schrimpf was listed as a producer of Degenerate Art by the German National Socialist government in the 1930s.

== Biographical details ==
Schrimpf was born in Munich, his father having died before Schrimpf's birth. His stepfather later forced him to leave home. In 1902 he apprenticed as a baker in Passau. From 1905 to 1914 Schrimpf wandered through Belgium, France, Switzerland and Northern Italy, working as a waiter, baker, and coal shuffler. In 1913 he lived in an anarchist colony in Switzerland, where he formed a friendship with Oskar Maria Graf, also a baker, but later a famous novelist.

With the outbreak of the First World War, the antimilitaristic Schrimpf "successfully employed every possible trick to avoid military service; in so doing, however, he ruined his health". From 1915–1918 Schrimpf lived in Berlin, where he worked as a freelance artist. In his free time he used every minute for drawing, painting, and wood carving. Mostly self-taught as an artist, he learned by copying the Old Masters.

In 1916 the famous publicist and art expert Herwarth Walden exhibited some of Schrimpf's paintings and woodcarvings in his Berlin gallery Der Stumm where they received much public attention. At this time and in this gallery Schrimpf met the painter Maria Uhden. The two married in 1917 but she died the following year, due to complications from the birth of their son Mark. He participated with the November Group and was included in their exhibitions of 1919, 1920, 1924 and 1929. Schrimpf published works, in such the Munich expressionist magazines as Der Weg, Die Bücherkiste and Die Sichel. In 1919 he was involved in the short-lived Munich Soviet Republic which attempted to establish a socialist state in Bavaria and was arrested after the movement was crushed. In 1921 his works were shown in Munich by art dealer Hans Goltz.

As early as the 1920s, Schrimpf was regarded as being a representative of the "right wing" of the Neue Sachlichkeit movement. Other prominent representatives of the wing included Alexander Kanoldt and Franz Lenk. The movement's so called "verist" wing included such artists as Otto Dix, George Grosz and Georg Scholz. In 1924 he moved to Italy where his second wife, Hedwig Marshall, found work as a nurse.

In 1925 Schrimpf participated in the Neue Sachlichkeit exhibition at the Mannheim Kunsthalle. Two years later, he began teaching at the Meisterschule für Dekorationskunst in Munich. The "right-wing" of the movement were not immediately condemned by the Nazi regime at an early stage and were able to take on professorships in painting after the regime seized power in 1933. Schrimpf's work was seen as an acceptable form of German Romanticism by the authorities.

1932 saw the foundation of the Group Seven and the start of a touring exhibition by the group; the other members were Theo Champion, Adolf Dietrich, Hasso von Hugo, Franz Radziwill, as well as Kanoldt and Lenk.

Schrimpf became professor at the Royal School of Art in Berlin in 1933, but was fired in 1937 because of his “red past”. He had been a short-time member of Rote Hilfe, a socialist organization. For the same reason the Nazi regime banned his works from public exhibitions. Schrimpf died in Berlin on 19 April 1938.

== Development and style ==
Schrimpf was self-taught. He drew compulsively as a child, drawing on his imagination and copying the works of others. In 1913, after his return from Ascona, he attended painting school in Munich but lasted only 8 days. His lack of confidence in his work meant he refused to show it to any but his friend Oskar Maria Graf. Persuaded to submit some examples to the Berlin publication "Aktion", Schrimpf was astonished when they were immediately accepted. His early supporters included the publicist and art patron Herwarth Walden, Herwarth of Der Sturm and Aktion, and the art historians Franz Roh and Werner Haftman.

Writing in 2012, for the catalogue of the exhibition "Modernist Masterpieces: the Haubrich Collection at Museum Ludwig" at the Museum Ludwig in Cologne, Olaf Peters says:

Schrimpf's artistic development emerged out of early Cubism. His paintings are characterised by a fixed composition, reduced and clear volumes, and Cubist simplification. His use of colour, however, has more in common with the Blauer Reiter group, setting clear highlights and making use of primary colours such as yellow and blue whose intensity disrupts the colour scheme. Schrimpf's figurative process, which he began to develop during the First World War, represents a synthesis of Jugendstil, Expressionism and Henri Rousseau's naive monumentality. The individual, harmoniously embedded in nature while simultaneously neutralised by it, appears as the main focus of the image. Moreover, religious allusions are not entirely absent in his works.

== Legacy ==
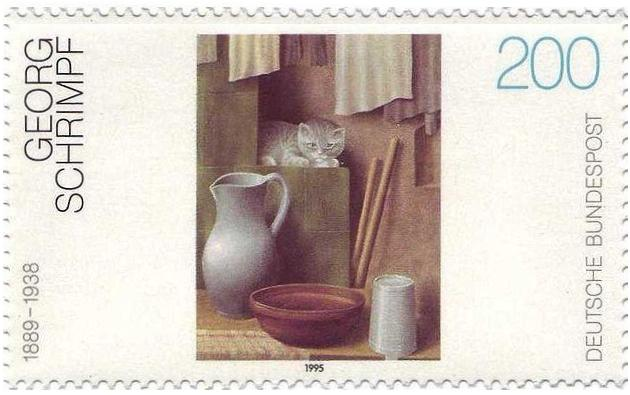
Postage stamp issued by Deutsche Bundespost in 1995 to commemorate Schrimpf

In 1995 Deutsche Bundespost honored Schrimpf with the issue of special stamp featuring his 1923 painting Still Life With Cat. The original painting is held by the Bayerische Staatsgemäldesammlungen, at the Staatsgalerie Moderne Kunst.
