= Nebel (surname) =

Nebel is a surname. Notable people with the surname include:

- Berthold Nebel (1889–1964), sculptor
- Carl Nebel (1805–1855), lithographer of Mexico
- Carmen Nebel (born 1956), German television presenter
- Frederick Nebel (1903–1967), American pulp writer
- Jane Henson (born Jane Nebel; 1934–2013), American puppeteer
- Long John Nebel (1911–1978), American talk radio personality
- Otto Nebel (1892–1973), German artist
- Paul Nebel (born 2002), German footballer
- Rudolf Nebel (1894–1978), German spaceflight advocate
