= Tobeen =

French painter

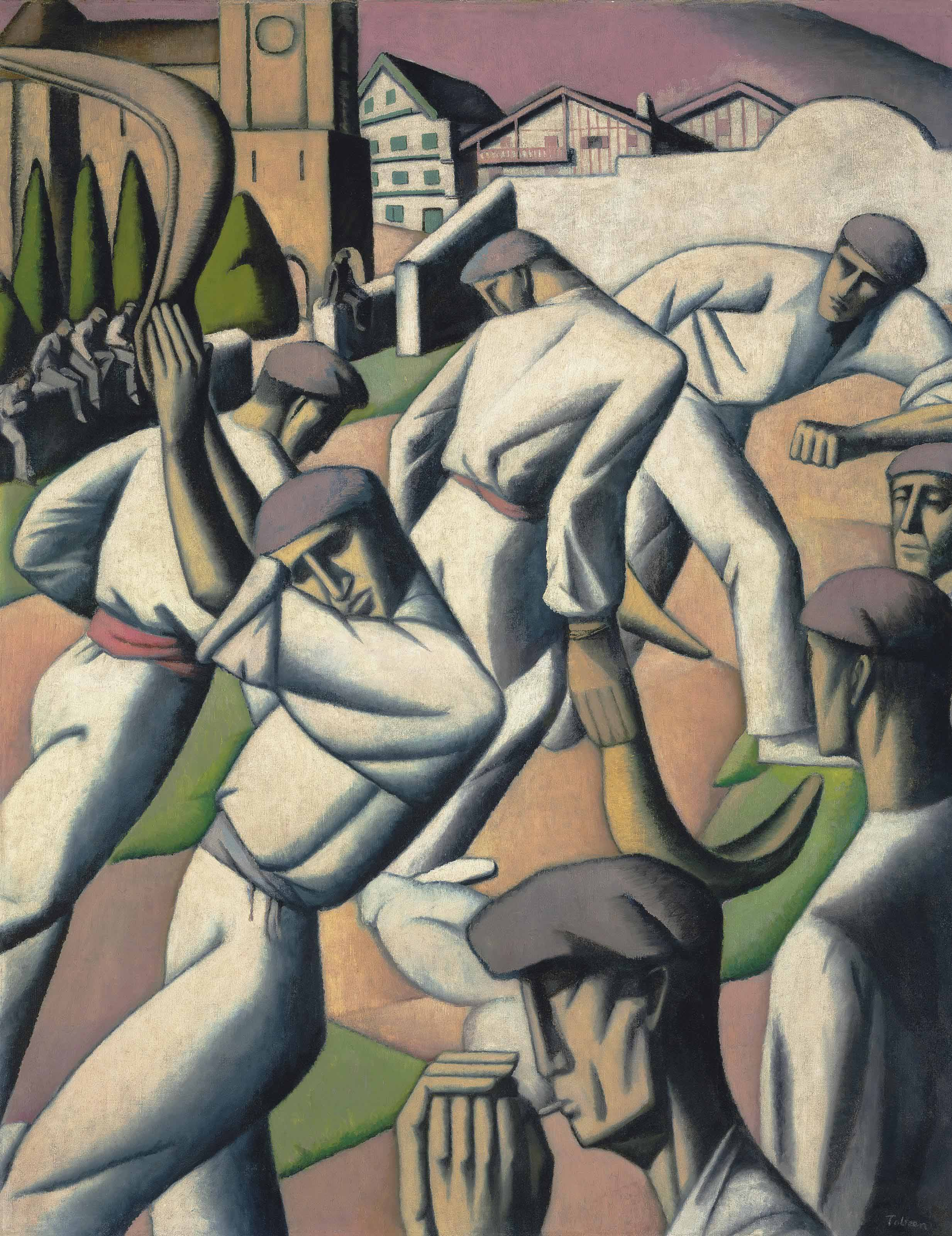
- Pelotaris, 1912
- Born: Félix Bonnet; July 20, 1880; Bordeaux, France
- Died: March 14, 1938 (aged 57); Saint-Valery-sur-Somme
- Known for: Painting
- Movement: Cubism

Tobeen (July 20, 1880 – March 1938) is the pseudonym of the French artist Félix Bonnet.

== Life ==
Tobeen stayed frequently in the western part of thé Pyrenees, Basque Country, but was born and bred in Bordeaux. Because of his frequent reference to Basque subjects within his paintings he became known as a Basque artist. However, he was not a Basque and neither were his parents.

From 1910 he worked in Paris where he maintained relations with the group of Pablo Picasso and Georges Braque and with the group of the Duchamp brothers (Gaston, Raymond and Marcel) in Puteaux. He exhibited eleven works at the Salon de la Section d'Or, Galerie La Boétie, Paris, October 1912.

Three photographs printed in the magazine Zlatá Praha (Golden Prague in Czech), 13 March 1914, for the occasion of the Moderni Umeni, S.V.U. Mánes exhibition in Prague. From left to right: Tobeen, Pelotaris (1912), Constantin Brâncuși, Portrait of Mademoiselle Pogany (1912), Jean Metzinger, La Femme à l'Éventail (Woman with a Fan) and En Canot (V Člunu)

Tobeen's paintings, drawings and woodcarvings show the traces of his Parisian period and his passion for the poetry in human life, but he was not a city-dweller. He loved a life of liberty, the sea, the woods. After 1920 he settled in Saint-Valery-sur-Somme, where he died in 1938.

== Exhibitions ==
- Salon de la Section d'Or, Galerie La Boétie (Paris), 1912
- Armory Show (New York), 1913
- Mánes Union of Fine Arts, Mánes Pavilion, (S.V.U. Manes), Prague, 1914
- Tobeen, un poète du cubisme: Bordeaux, Galerie Musée des Beaux Arts, June 8 – September 16, 2012

== Museum collections ==
The Netherlands

- Centraal Museum, Utrecht
- Kröller-Müller Museum, Otterlo
- In former times Scheringa Museum of Realist Art, Spanbroek

France

- Musée basque et de l'histoire de Bayonne, Bayonne
- Musée des beaux-arts de Bordeaux, Bordeaux
- Musées Menton, collection Wakefield, Menton
- Musée des Beaux-Arts de Nancy, Nancy
