= Johannes Molzahn =

German artist

Johannes Molzahn (Duisburg, 21 May 1892 – Munich, 31 December 1965) was a German artist.

He was born in Duisburg. He learned drawing and photography, but later concentrated on painting. 1908 to 1914 he stayed in Switzerland. Molzahn became acquainted with Herwarth Walden, Walter Gropius, Theo van Doesburg and El Lissitzky. He was a member of the Arbeitsrat für Kunst and taught at the Staatliche Akademie für Kunst und Kunstgewerbe Breslau. After World War I he worked as a graphic designer and through intervention of Bruno Taut became a graphics teacher in Magdeburg. He was forbidden to work by the Nazis in 1933 and fired. Eight of his works were shown in the exhibition of entartete Kunst in 1937.

He emigrated to the United States in 1938 and returned to Germany 1959, settling in Munich. He died at age 73.
