= Maria Uhden =

German artist

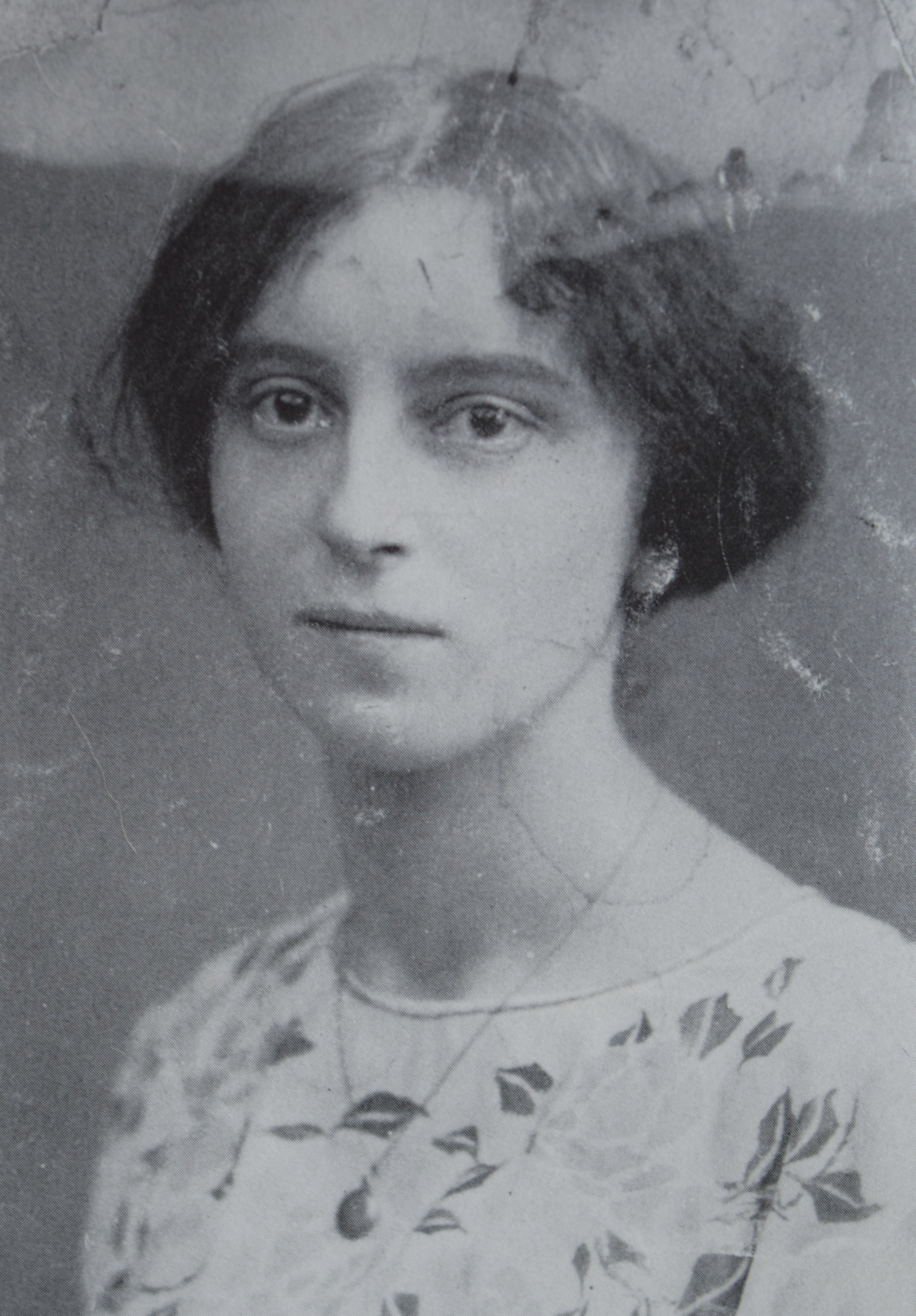
- Maria Uhden ca. 1915.
- Born: 6 March 1892; Coburg, Germany
- Died: 14 August 1918 (aged 26); Munich, Germany
- Known for: Painting
- Movement: German Expressionism
- Spouse: Georg Schrimpf

Maria Uhden (1892 – 1918) was a German painter and printmaker.

== Biography ==
Uhden was born on 6 March 1892 in Coburg, Germany. She was part of the German Expressionist movement. She was married to fellow painter Georg Schrimpf. She died on 14 August 1918 in Munich.

Her work is in the collection of the Los Angeles County Museum of Art, the Metropolitan Museum of Art, the Museum of Modern Art, the National Gallery of Art, and the Fine Arts Museums of San Francisco

== Gallery ==
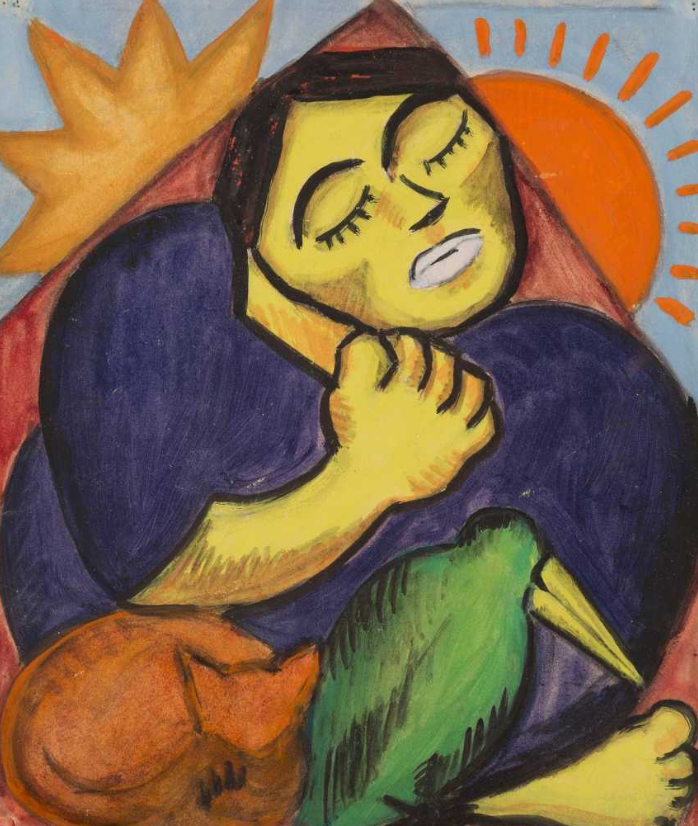
Frau mit Vogel, 1917

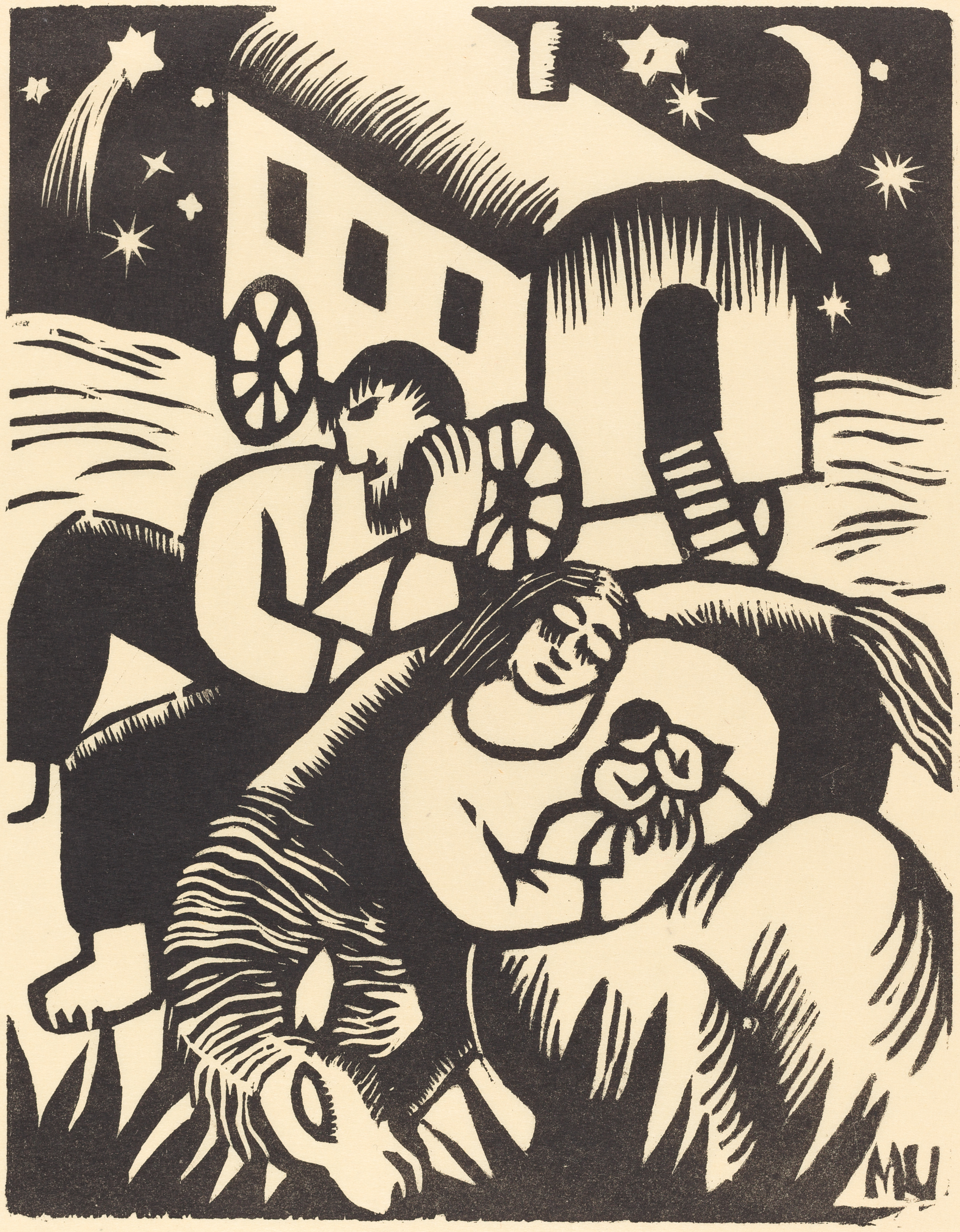
Ruhende Zigeuner, 1918
