= Herwarth Walden =

German artist (1878–1941)

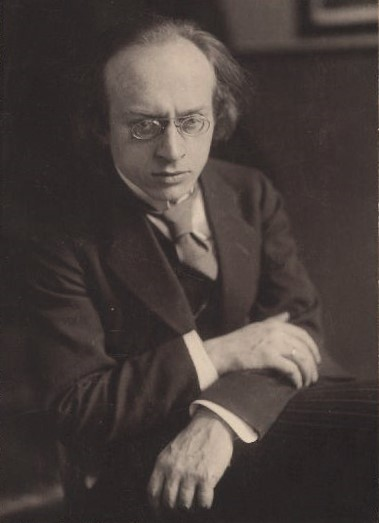
- Born: Georg Lewin; September 16, 1879; Berlin, German Empire
- Died: October 31, 1941 (aged 62); Saratov, Russian SFSR, Soviet Union
- Occupations: Painter, artist
- Known for: Founder of Der Sturm magazine

Herwarth Walden (actual name Georg Lewin; 16 September 1879 – 31 October 1941) was a German expressionist artist and art expert in many disciplines. He is broadly acknowledged as one of the most important discoverers and promoters of German avant-garde art in the early twentieth century (Expressionism, Futurism, Dadaism, Magic realism). He was best known as the founder of the Expressionist magazine Der Sturm (The Storm) and its offshoots.

== Career ==
He studied composition and piano at the music academies of Berlin and Florence. However, his interest embraced all arts. So he became a musician, composer, writer, critic, and gallery owner. He was best known as the founder of the expressionist magazine Der Sturm (The Storm) and its offshoots. These consisted of a publishing house and journal, founded in 1910, to which he added an art gallery two years later.

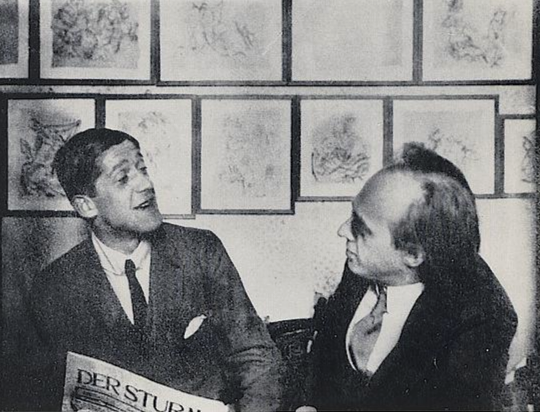
Walden with painter Oskar Kokoschka, 1917

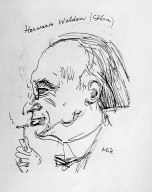
Pen and ink sketch of Walden by Emil Orlik

He discovered, sponsored and promoted many young, still unknown artists of different styles and trends, such as the Blaue Reiter and Italian Futurism. Later some of them became very famous, among others: Oskar Kokoschka, Maria Uhden, Georg Schrimpf. He also discovered and promoted several poets, notably August Stramm, Otto Nebel, and Franz Richard Behrens. The literary style he espoused became known as 'Wort-Kunst' (Word-Art).

From 1901 to 1911, Walden was married to Else Lasker-Schüler, the leading female representative of German expressionist poetry. She invented for him the pseudonym "Herwarth Walden", inspired by Henry Thoreau's book Walden, or Life in the Woods (1854). In 1912 he married Swedish painter Nell Roslund. In 1919, he became a member of the Communist Party. In 1924, he was divorced from his second wife. With the economic depression of the 1930s and the subsequent rise of Nazism, his activities were compromised.

In 1932, he married again and left Germany shortly thereafter because of the threat of the Gestapo. He went to Moscow, where he worked as a teacher and publisher. His sympathies for the avant-garde soon aroused the suspicion of the Soviet government, and he had to repeatedly defend against the equation of avant-garde and fascism. Walden was imprisoned and died in October 1941 in a Soviet prison in Saratov. His death was established by the International Tracing Service.

== Works ==
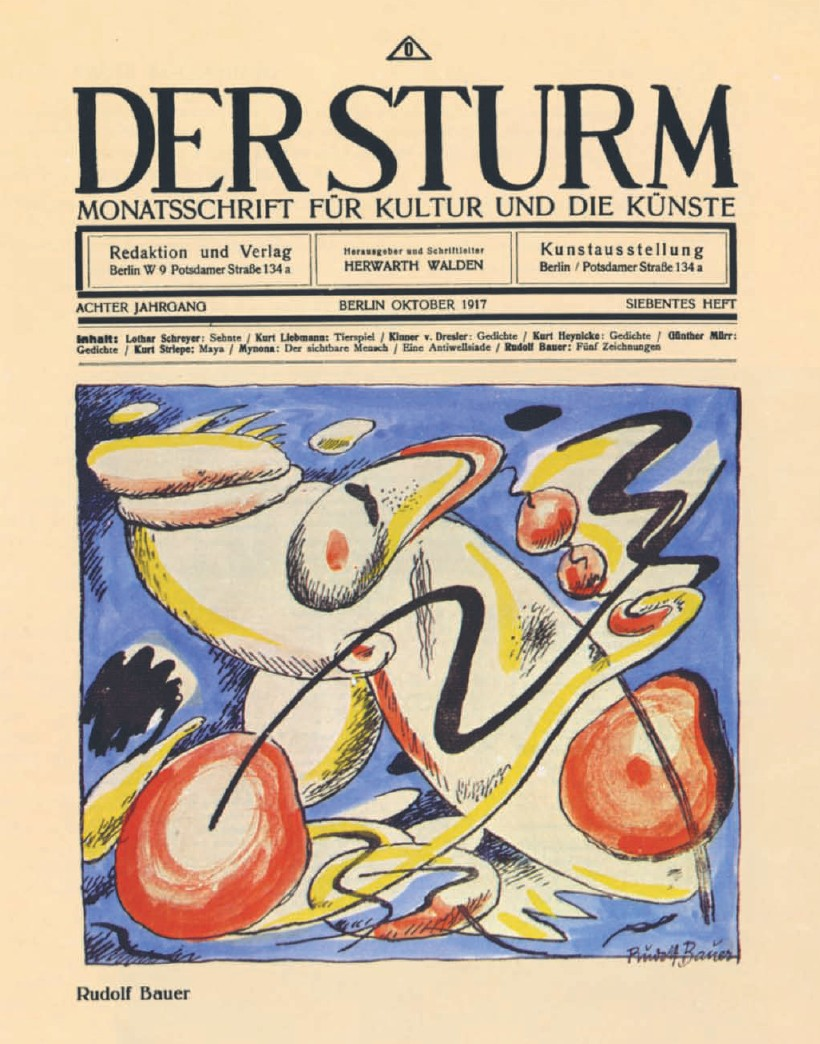
Der Sturm for October 1917. Cover art by Rudolf Bauer

- Der Sturm (Magazine, 1910–1932)
- Dafnislieder für Gesang und Klavier (Songs, 1910)
- Das Buch der Menschenliebe (Novel, 1916)
- Die Härte der Weltenliebe (Novel, 1917)
- Expressionismus: Die Kunstwende (Essays, 1918)
- Kind (Drama, 1918)
- Menschen (Drama, 1918)
- Unter den Sinnen (Novel, 1919)
- Die neue Malerei (Essays, 1920)
- Glaube (Drama, 1920)
- Einblick in Kunst (Essay, 1920)
- Sünde (Drama, 1920)
- Die Beiden (Drama, 1920)
- Erste Liebe (Drama, 1920)
- Letzte Liebe (Drama, 1920)
- Im Geschweig der Liebe (Poems, 1925)
- Vulgär-Expressionismus (Essay, 1938)
