= Der Sturm =

German art and literary magazine (1910–1932)

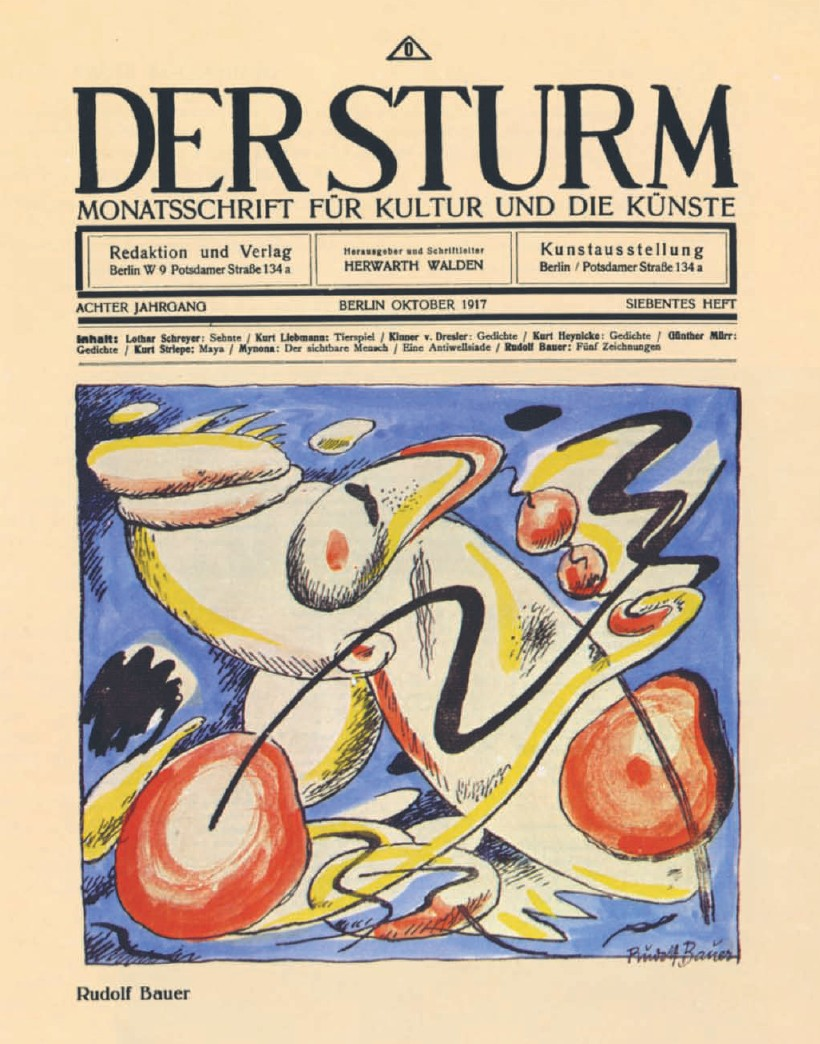
Der Sturm for October 1917. Cover art by Rudolf Bauer

Der Sturm (transl. The Storm) was a German avant-garde art and literary magazine founded by Herwarth Walden, covering Expressionism, Cubism, Dada and Surrealism, among other artistic movements. It was published between 1910 and 1932.

== History and profile ==
Der Sturm was established in Berlin in 1910 by Herwarth Walden, and its first issue appeared on 3 March that year. It ran weekly from 1910 to 1914, monthly from 1914 to 1924, and quarterly until it ceased publication in 1932. From 1916 to 1928, it was edited by the artist and Bauhaus teacher Lothar Schreyer

The magazine was modeled on the Italian literary magazine La Voce which was published in Florence from 1908 to 1916.

Jean Metzinger, 1913, En Canot (Im Boot), oil on canvas, 146 x 114 cm, exhibited at Moderni Umeni, S.V.U. Mánes, Prague, 1914, acquired in 1916 by Georg Muche at the Galerie Der Sturm, confiscated by the Nazis circa 1936, displayed at the Degenerate Art show in Munich, and missing ever since.

Among the literary contributors were Peter Altenberg, Max Brod, Paul Leppin, Richard Dehmel, Alfred Döblin, Anatole France, Knut Hamsun, Arno Holz, Karl Kraus, Selma Lagerlöf, Adolf Loos, Heinrich Mann, Paul Scheerbart, and René Schickele. Der Sturm consisted of pieces such as expressionistic dramas (i.e. from Hermann Essig and August Stramm), artistic portfolios (Oskar Kokoschka and Curt Stoermer), essays from artists (the Kandinsky Album), and theoretical writings on art from Herwarth Walden. The best known publications resulting from the magazine were the Sturmbücher (storm-books), (e.g. Sturmbücher 1 and 2 were works of August Stramm – Sancta Susanna und Rudimentär). Postcards were also created featuring the expressionistic, cubist, and abstract art of Franz Marc, Wassily Kandinsky, Oskar Kokoschka, August Macke, Gabriele Münter, Georg Schrimpf, Maria Uhden, Rudolf Bauer and others. The term Sturm was branded by Walden to represent the way in which modern art was penetrating Germany at the time.

Particularly in the time before outbreak of the World War I, Der Sturm played a crucial role in the French-German exchange of expressionist artists, which led to a special relationship between Berlin and Paris. Regularly, poems and other texts of French and/or French-speaking expressionists were published (Guillaume Apollinaire, Blaise Cendrars, etc.). This relationship was renewed after the war despite the hostilities between the two countries caused by the fighting. The magazine also contained avant-garde poetry examples.

Der Sturm stood out from other art magazines of that time by including the art created by women. The exhibitions organized by the magazine included works of Gabriele Münter, Sonia Delaunay, Else Lasker-Schüler, Marianne von Werefkin, Natalia Goncharova, Jacoba van Heemskerck and others. Before the Gallery closed in 1932, it had shown works by over 30 female painters and sculptors – more than any other gallery of the era.

== Gallery ==
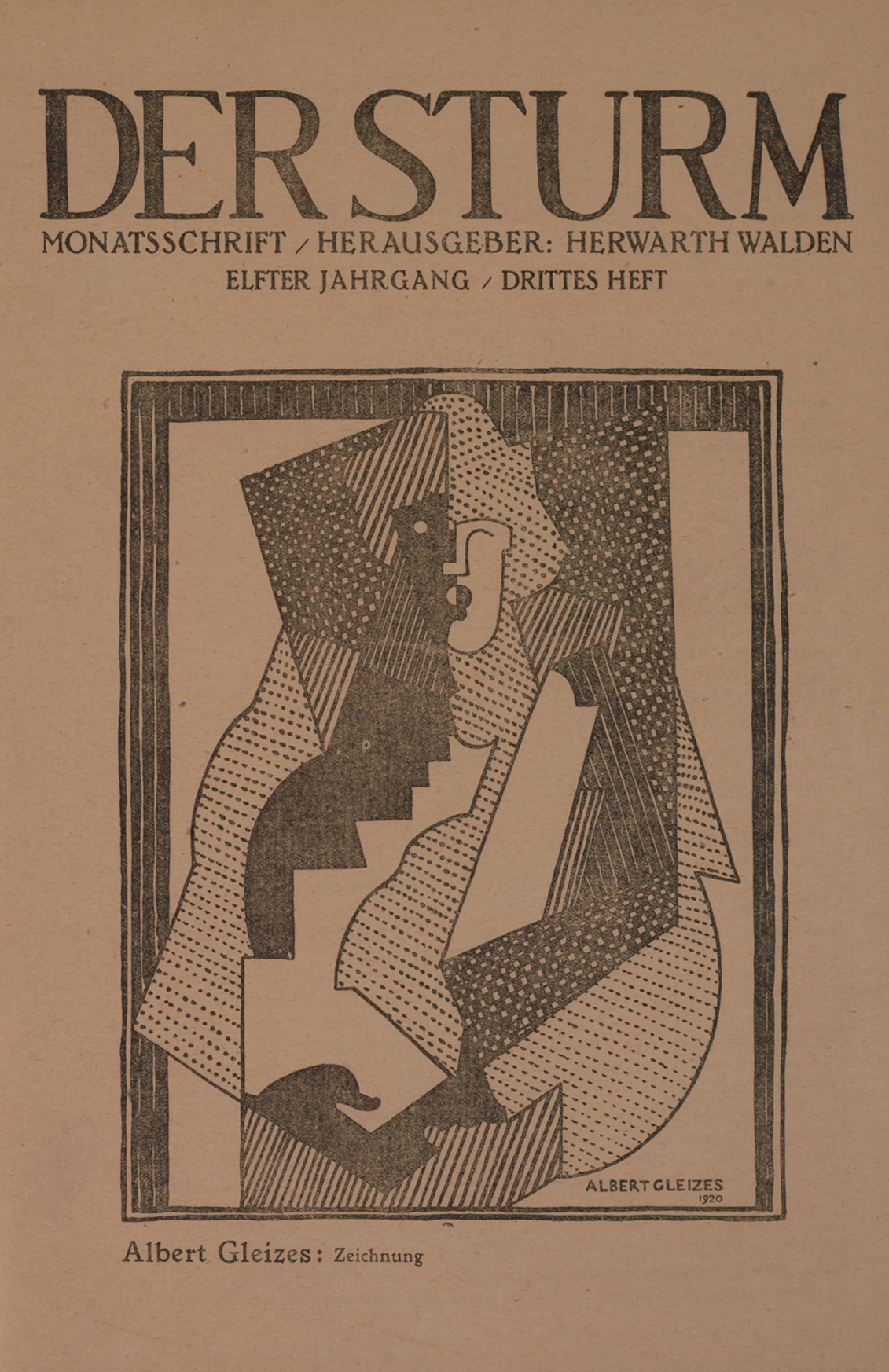
Albert Gleizes, study for Femme aux gants noirs, drawing (zeichnung), published on the cover of Der Sturm 5 June 1920

Sonia Delaunay or Robert Delaunay (or both), 1922, published in Der Sturm, Volume 13, Number 3, 5 March 1922

The magazine also fostered the Galerie Der Sturm, started by Walden to celebrate its 100th edition, in 1912. The gallery became the focus for Berlin's modern art scene for a decade. Starting with an exhibition of Fauves and Der Blaue Reiter, followed by the introduction in Germany of the Italian Futurists, Cubists and Orphists, the gallery was to exhibit Edvard Munch, Georges Braque, Pablo Picasso, Jean Metzinger, Albert Gleizes, Robert Delaunay, Gino Severini, Jean Arp, Paul Klee, Wassily Kandinsky, Serge Charchoune and Kurt Schwitters.

After the war, Walden expanded Der Sturm into Sturmabende, lectures and discussions on modern art, and Die Sturmbühne, an expressionist theatre, as well as publishing books and portfolios by leading artists such as Oskar Kokoschka. Despite this, the gallery declined in importance after the war and closed in 1924, leaving the magazine to carry on as a quarterly until it too closed in 1932.

However, concerning the exact closing date of the Der Sturm Art Gallery (an offshoot of the magazine) as Maurice Godé, wrote in his book "Der Sturm of Herwarth Walden or the utopia of an autonomous art", the author wanted to promote the German "avant-garde" arts by means of both resident and touring exhibitions. Accordingly, Walden organized, until 1932, more than 200 exhibitions in its premises in Berlin plus multiple other touring exhibitions (Wanderausstellungen) in Germany and also in most other major European cities.

== See also ==
- List of magazines in Germany
- Die Aktion
- Proto-Cubism
- Cubism
- Orphism
