= Thalheimer =

Thalheimer is a surname. Notable people with the surname include:

- August Thalheimer (1884–1948), a German Marxist theorist
- Bertha Thalheimer (1883–1959), a German Communist Party member
- Paul Thalheimer (1884–1948), a German painter
- Peter Thalheimer (1936–2018), a Canadian lawyer and politician
- Ricardo Thalheimer (born 1992), a Brazilian footballer
- Richard Thalheimer, an American investor

== See also ==
- Thalhimers, an American department store founded by William Thalhimer
- Thalhimer Tennis Center, a facility at the Virginia Commonwealth University
