= Werner Scholz =

Werner Scholz may refer to:

- Werner Scholz (footballer)
- Werner Scholz (painter)
- Werner Scholz (violinist)
