= Never Look Away (2018 film) =

2018 German romantic drama film

- Theatrical release poster
- Directed by: Florian Henckel von Donnersmarck
- Written by: Florian Henckel von Donnersmarck
- Produced by: Florian Henckel von Donnersmarck; Jan Mojto; Quirin Berg; Max Wiedemann
- Starring: Tom Schilling; Sebastian Koch; Paula Beer; Saskia Rosendahl; Oliver Masucci; Ina Weisse
- Cinematography: Caleb Deschanel
- Edited by: Patricia Rommel
- Music by: Max Richter
- Production company: Wiedemann & Berg Film Production
- Distributed by: Buena Vista International
- Release dates: 4 September 2018 (Venice); 3 October 2018 (Germany)
- Running time: 188 minutes
- Country: Germany
- Languages: German; Russian
- Box office: US$9M

Never Look Away (German: Werk ohne Autor, lit. 'Work Without [an] Author') is a 2018 German epic coming-of-age romantic drama film written and directed by Florian Henckel von Donnersmarck. It was nominated for a Golden Lion at the 75th Venice International Film Festival and for a Golden Globe for Best Foreign Language Film. It was nominated for two Academy Awards at the 91st Academy Awards, in the Best Foreign Language Film and Best Cinematography categories. This was only the second time that a German-language film by a German director was nominated for an Oscar in multiple categories, the other film being Wolfgang Petersen's Das Boot 36 years earlier.

== Plot ==
As a child during Nazi-era Germany, Kurt Barnert (inspired by Gerhard Richter) visits an exhibit of Degenerate Art in Dresden with his beautiful young aunt Elisabeth. While there, he is mesmerized by Girl with Blue Hair, a modernist sculpture by Eugen Hoffmann.

At a Nazi Party rally, Elisabeth – a member of the National Socialist Women's League – is given the honour of personally presenting a bouquet of flowers to Adolf Hitler. Later that day at home, Kurt walks in on a nude Elisabeth playing Bach's music on the piano. She tells a startled Kurt to "never look away" because "everything that is true holds beauty in it." Elisabeth then begins hitting a single piano note repeatedly, rambling euphorically that she is "playing a concert for the Führer", and then begins deliriously hitting herself on the head with a broken ashtray.

Elisabeth is diagnosed with schizophrenia, and is sterilized and later murdered under the Nazi euthanasia program. The doctor who orders her sterilization and death is gynecologist Professor Carl Seeband, a high-ranking member of the SS medical corps. After the war, Seeband is arrested by the Soviets and placed in a prison camp, facing likely execution. While there, he volunteers to assist a Red Army officer's wife during a complicated birth and saves the lives of both wife and child. The grateful Soviet officer releases Seeband and thereafter helps to keep evidence of his Nazi past from catching up with him.

As an adult, Kurt studies painting at the Dresden Academy of Fine Arts, where he falls in love with a young fashion design student named Elisabeth (like his aunt), whom he calls Ellie. She is the daughter of Professor Seeband, though neither of them is aware of their shared history and connection. Kurt excels in his studies, but he is forced to complete paintings that reflect socialist realism, an ideology and school of art with which he does not identify. Eventually, he meets Ellie's father, who is now toeing the East German socialist party line. Seeband sees Kurt as genetically inferior to, and therefore unsuitable for, his daughter, and goes to great lengths to sabotage the young couple's relationship, even performing an abortion on Elisabeth based on a made-up health concern when she becomes pregnant with Kurt's child. However, the young couple's love strengthens and eventually the two get married. Fearing prosecution after the Soviet officer who had been protecting him is transferred to Moscow, Seeband flees East Germany for West Germany.

Kurt and Ellie flee to West Germany themselves several years later. Since Kurt is already 30 years old, he lies about his age to be admitted to the famous Düsseldorf Art Academy, where he is able to study and practice art more freely than he could in East Germany. His teacher, Professor Antonius van Verten (based on Joseph Beuys) recognizes Kurt's deep personal experience, but he also sees that Kurt is struggling to find his own voice, having been trained only in figurative painting, a medium considered outdated and bourgeois by the standards of the school. Kurt shares adjoining studio space with fellow student and confidant Harry Preusser (inspired by Günther Uecker), who experiments with hammering nails into boards to produce large artworks.

Only when Kurt finds a newspaper article about a captured Nazi doctor who was Seeband's superior does he have his artistic breakthrough. He starts using his figurative painting skills to copy black-and-white photographs onto canvases, adding a mysterious sfumato blur. Among the sources for the new paintings are Seeband's passport photographs and photographs with Aunt Elisabeth from Kurt's own family album. When Seeband sees a painting that is a collage of photographs of himself, the captured Nazi doctor, and Kurt with his Aunt Elisabeth, he abruptly leaves the studio. It is unclear if he is simply overwhelmed at being reminded of his past, just realized Elisabeth was Kurt's relative, or believes his son-in-law has uncovered his secret, but Kurt, for his part, still seems to be unaware of the connection.

After years of infertility due to the abortion, Ellie becomes pregnant, and Kurt celebrates the moment she told him by painting her nude. Some time later, he gets his first art show, where his art impresses the critics, even though they completely misunderstand and misinterpret it. He rejoices in finally finding his voice and his place in the world.

== Cast ==
- Tom Schilling as Kurt Barnert
  - Cai Cohrs as Kurt Barnert at 6 years old
- Sebastian Koch as Professor Carl Seeband
- Paula Beer as Ellie Seeband
- Saskia Rosendahl as Elisabeth May
- Oliver Masucci as Professor Antonius van Verten
- Hanno Koffler as Günther Preusser
- Yevgeny Sidikhin as NKVD Major Mikhail Muravyov
- Jörg Schüttauf as Johann Barnert
- Jeanette Hain as Waltraut Barnert
- Hans-Uwe Bauer as Professor Horst Grimma
- Ina Weisse as Martha Seeband
- Lars Eidinger as Exhibition Guide Heiner Kerstens
- Johanna Gastdorf as Grandmother Malvine
- David Schütter as Adrian Schimmel / Finck
- Franz Pätzold as Max Seifert
- Jonas Dassler as Ehrenfried May
- Jacob Matschenz as Arendt Ivo
- Florian Bartholomäi as Günther May
- Ben Becker as Foreman Otto
- Rainer Bock as Dr Burghart Kroll
- Hinnerk Schönemann as Werner Blaschke
- Martin Bruchmann as Oscar

== Historical background ==
Director Florian Henckel von Donnersmarck explained that Never Look Away is a work of fiction, but that the inspiration had been an article by German investigative reporter Jürgen Schreiber about German painter Gerhard Richter. Richter's aunt Marianne Schönfelder had been murdered by the Nazis because she developed schizophrenia. Richter immortalized her in a painting titled Aunt Marianne, in which she is holding Gerhard Richter as a baby. This painting was originally released under the title Mother and Child because it was Richter's habit to obfuscate the connections his paintings had to his personal life. This led art historians to refer to his body of work as being 'without author', as it purportedly had no connection to its author's life.

What Schreiber's investigative research uncovered in 2002 was that Gerhard Richter's father-in-law, Heinrich Eufinger, had been a high-ranking SS-doctor and fervent Nazi who himself performed over 900 forced sterilizations on women whom the Nazis considered unfit to reproduce. While he did not perform the operation on Marianne Schönfelder personally, he was the director of the hospital where it was performed.

Even though Gerhard Richter only found out about this connection between the families through the article at age 70, his body of work suggests that – at least on a subconscious level – he must have known. One of his earliest paintings is of the arrest of Eufinger's SS boss, Werner Heyde, from a newspaper photograph. Another one from the same series, Family at the Seaside, is a snapshot from his wife's photo album showing her father, Professor Eufinger, horse-playing with his family, a photograph that is unremarkable except for the fact that it was taken around the exact time Eufinger sent Richter's aunt to her death.

The largest photo painting that Gerhard Richter produced before turning to abstract art was Ema, Nude on a Staircase (#134 in his official catalogue raisonné). Ema, short for 'Marianne', was Gerhard Richter's wife and also shared her first name with his aunt. Unusually for Richter, this painting is dated very precisely to May 1966. His first child was born on 30 December 1966, and he explained that this photograph was staged by him when he had found out that Ema was three months pregnant. In a New Yorker profile of writer/director Florian Henckel von Donnersmarck, who spent many weeks with Gerhard Richter during his research for the film, but had not revealed anything about the content of these conversations, the director is quoted as saying that Gerhard Richter said "Ema's father had been her gynecologist, and that there were mysteries and rumors around the treatment that he provided her".

Richter claimed he told Donnersmarck that he did not want the movie character to bear his name. He also claimed he suggested to Donnersmarck that the film's protagonist might have a different profession. Donnersmarck read Richter the full screenplay when he was finished writing it so Richter could see for himself how much was fiction and where facts from his life were used. When the film was finished and Donnersmarck offered to arrange a screening, however, Richter said he did not feel up to it and did not feel he had the strength to see the film. Donnersmarck stated he understood this reaction, as few people would want to relive some version of the most traumatic chapters of their life on screen. He said it would probably be hurtful if it was too close to the facts and perhaps even more hurtful if it was not close enough, concluding that, "maybe the film is for everybody except him".

When asked to comment on the film by the German press, Richter said he had not seen the film, but he found the trailer too reißerisch (transl. thriller-like). Commenting on the material he had supplied to Donnersmarck in interviews, Richter told The New Yorker: "I gave him something in writing stating that he was explicitly not allowed to use or publish either my name or any of my paintings. He reassured me to respect my wishes. But in reality, he has done everything to link my name to his movie, and the press was helping him to the best of its ability. Fortunately, the most important newspapers here reviewed his concoction very skeptically and critically. Nevertheless, he managed to abuse and grossly distort my biography!"

== Release ==
At the 75th Venice International Film Festival, where Never Look Away had its very first public screening, it received a 13-minute standing ovation. It also won audience awards at various festivals, mostly in competition with the same films it was up against in Venice.

== Reception ==
=== Box office ===
Never Look Away reached a lifetime theatrical gross in the United States of US$1,303,747.

=== Critical response ===
On the review aggregator website Rotten Tomatoes, 77% of 141 critics' reviews are positive, with an average rating of 7.4/10. The website's consensus reads: "Never Look Away fills its protracted running time with the absorbing story of an incredible life -- and its impact on the singular artist who lived it." On Metacritic, the film has a weighted average score of 68 out of 100, based on 28 critics, indicating "generally favorable reviews".

Ann Hornaday of The Washington Post wrote: "The title of "Never Look Away" is deliciously ironic: This is one of the most mesmerizing, compulsively watchable films in theaters right now." Leonard Maltin, who showed the film to students in his master class at USC Film School, wrote: "I urge you to see Never Look Away. It is a rich and rewarding experience, and the three hours fly by." In Commentary magazine, in an article titled "The Greatness of Never Look Away – Triumphant", John Podhoretz compared Never Look Away favorably to David Lean's Doctor Zhivago and called it "the rare movie you actually wish were longer because it is so involving, heart-wrenching, and beautiful."

Kyle Smith, critic-at-large for the National Review, wrote in an article titled "A New Cinematic Masterpiece": "The German director Florian Henckel von Donnersmarck already has one of the best films of the century to his credit: 2007's The Lives of Others. His new one is, I think, even better. It may be the best German film I've ever seen. Never Look Away is the title." He went on to state: "It's about the biggest themes (art, war, love, death), it's emotionally overwhelming, its dialogue is lapidary, its musical score transporting. It's one of the best films of the decade."

Dissenting voices included contrarian critic Armond White of the National Review, as well as David Edelstein of Vulture. Boyd van Hoeij wrote in The Hollywood Reporter that "the work's considerations of the intimate connection among being, art and life finally feel quite superficial."

The San Francisco Chronicle quoted William Friedkin (director of The French Connection and The Exorcist, among others) as stating: "One of the finest films I have ever seen is Never Look Away – a masterpiece."

In an interview with Mingle Media, Miranda Bailey (producer, actress, and founder of the feminist critic website CherryPicks) called Never Look Away "the best movie I've ever seen, in my entire life – ever – in my whole life."

=== Awards and nominations ===
Year	Award	Category	Recipient (s)	Result
2018	Venice Film Festival	Golden Lion	Florian Henckel von Donnersmarck	Nominated
2018	Venice Film Festival	Arca CinemaGiovani Award	Florian Henckel von Donnersmarck	Won
2018	Venice Film Festival	Leoncino d'Oro	Florian Henckel von Donnersmarck	Won
2019	Young Cinema Award	Best International Film	Florian Henckel von Donnersmarck	Won
2019	Golden Globe Awards	Best Foreign Language Film	Florian Henckel von Donnersmarck	Nominated
2019	Academy Awards	Best Foreign Language Film	Florian Henckel von Donnersmarck	Nominated
2019	Academy Awards	Best Cinematography	Caleb Deschanel	Nominated
2019	Deutscher Filmpreis	Best Performance by an Actor in a Supporting Role	Oliver Masucci	Nominated

== See also ==
- List of submissions to the 91st Academy Awards for Best Foreign Language Film
- List of German submissions for the Academy Award for Best Foreign Language Film
