= Degenerate art =

Pejorative term used by the Nazi Party for modern art

External videos
- Art in Nazi Germany, Smarthistory

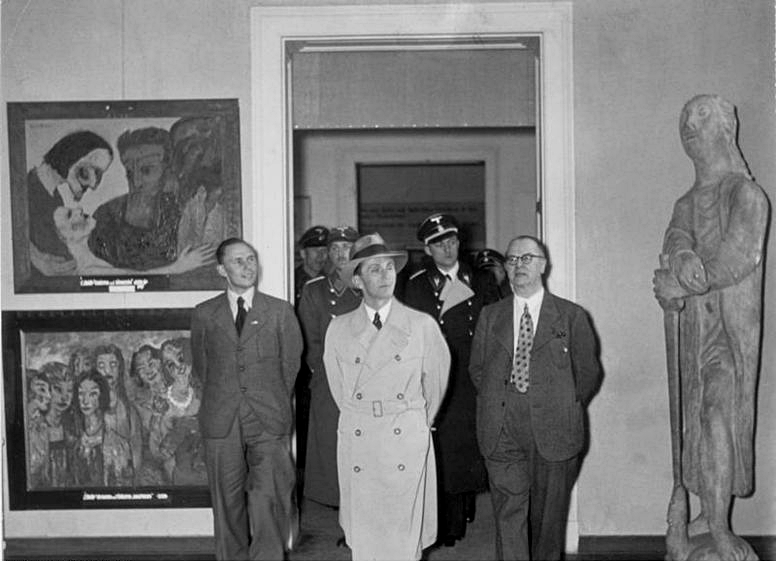
Joseph Goebbels views the Degenerate Art exhibition (1937).

Degenerate art (German: Entartete Kunst) was a term adopted in the 1920s by the Nazi Party in Germany to describe modern art. During the dictatorship of Adolf Hitler, German modernist art, including many works of internationally renowned artists, was removed from state-owned museums and banned in Nazi Germany on the grounds that such art was an "insult to German feeling", un-German, Freemasonic, Jewish, or Communist in nature. Those identified as degenerate artists were subjected to sanctions that included dismissal from teaching positions, being forbidden to exhibit or to sell their art, and in some cases being forbidden to produce art.

Degenerate Art also was the title of a 1937 exhibition held by the Nazis in Munich, consisting of 650 modernist artworks that the Nazis had taken from museums, that were poorly hung alongside graffiti and text labels mocking the art and the artists. Designed to inflame public opinion against modernism, the exhibition subsequently traveled to several other cities in Germany and Austria.

While modern styles of art were prohibited, the Nazis promoted paintings and sculptures that were traditional in manner and that exalted the "blood and soil" values of racial purity, militarism, and obedience. Similar restrictions were placed upon music, which was expected to be tonal and free of any jazz influences; disapproved music was termed degenerate music. Films and plays were also censored.

== Theories of degeneracy ==
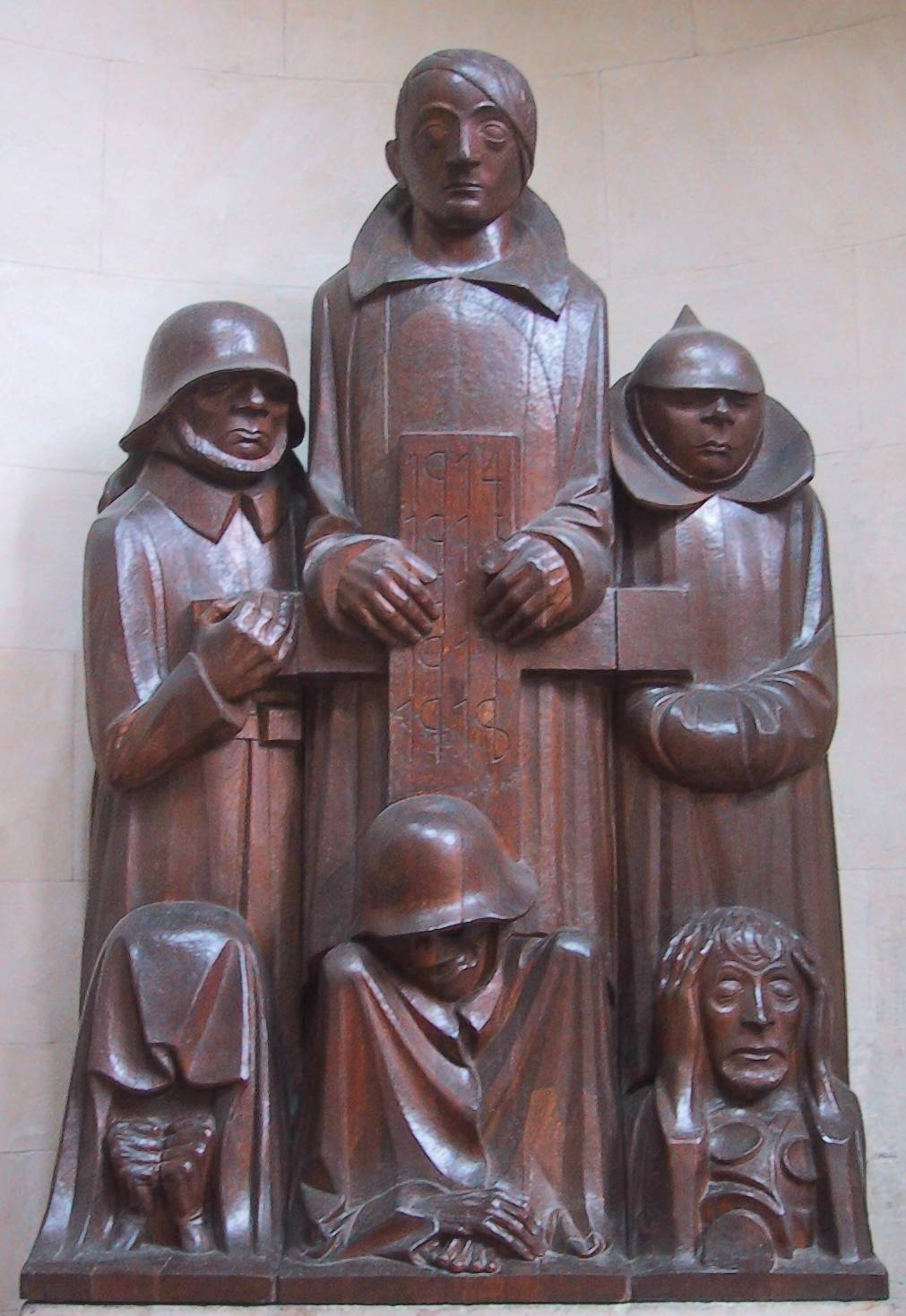
The Magdeburger Ehrenmal (the Magdeburg cenotaph), by Ernst Barlach, was declared to be degenerate art due to the "deformity" and emaciation of the figures—corresponding to Nordau's theorized connection between "mental and physical degeneration".

The term Entartung (or "degeneracy") had gained currency in Germany by the late 19th century when the critic and author Max Nordau devised the theory presented in his 1892 book Degeneration. Nordau drew upon the writings of the criminologist Cesare Lombroso, whose The Criminal Man, published in 1876, attempted to prove that there were "born criminals" whose atavistic personality traits could be detected by scientifically measuring abnormal physical characteristics. Nordau developed from this premise a critique of modern art, explained as the work of those so corrupted and enfeebled by modern life that they have lost the self-control needed to produce coherent works. He attacked Aestheticism in English literature and described the mysticism of the German composer Richard Wagner and the Symbolist movement in French literature as a product of mental pathology. Explaining the painterliness of Impressionism as the sign of a diseased visual cortex, he decried modern degeneracy while praising traditional German culture. Despite the fact that Nordau was Jewish and a key figure in the Zionist movement (Lombroso was also Jewish), his theory of artistic degeneracy would be seized upon by German Nazis during the Weimar Republic as a rallying point for their antisemitic and racist demand for Aryan purity in art.

Belief in a Germanic spirit—defined as mystical, rural, moral, bearing ancient wisdom, and noble in the face of a tragic destiny—existed long before the rise of the Nazis; Richard Wagner explored such ideas in his writings. Beginning before World War I, the well-known German architect and painter Paul Schultze-Naumburg's influential writings, which invoked racial theories in condemning modern art and architecture, supplied much of the basis for Adolf Hitler's belief that classical Greece and the Middle Ages were the true sources of Aryan art. Schultze-Naumburg subsequently wrote such books as Die Kunst der Deutschen. Ihr Wesen und ihre Werke (The art of the Germans. Its nature and its works) and Kunst und Rasse (Art and Race), the latter published in 1928, in which he argued that only racially pure artists could produce a healthy art which upheld timeless ideals of classical beauty, while racially mixed modern artists produced disordered artworks and monstrous depictions of the human form. By reproducing examples of modern art next to photographs of people with deformities and diseases, he graphically reinforced the idea of modernism as a sickness. Alfred Rosenberg developed this theory in Der Mythos des 20. Jahrhunderts (Myth of the Twentieth Century), published in 1933, which became a best-seller in Germany and made Rosenberg the Party's leading ideological spokesman.

== Weimar reactionism ==
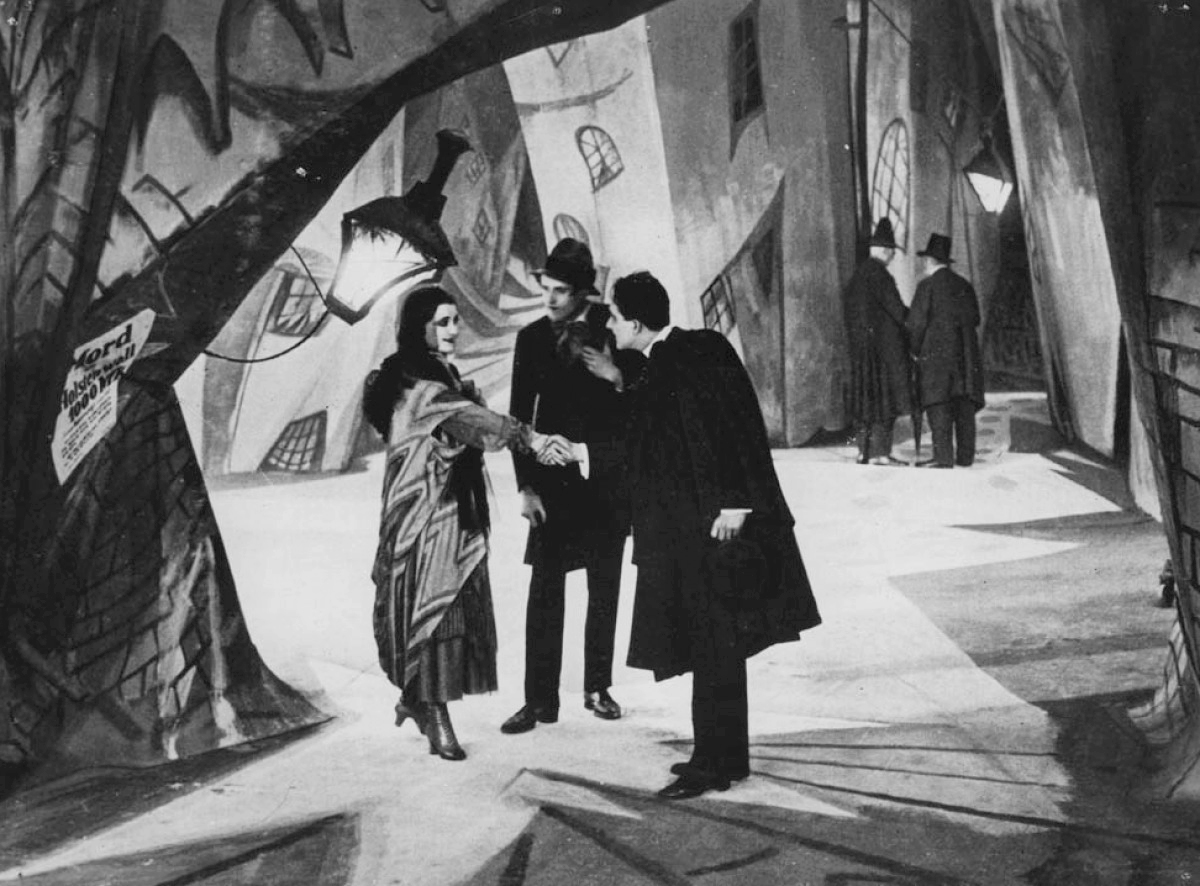
A still from The Cabinet of Dr. Caligari

The early 20th century was a period of wrenching changes in the arts. The development of modern art at the beginning of the 20th century, albeit with roots going back to the 1860s, denoted a revolutionary divergence from traditional artistic values to ones based on the personal perceptions and feelings of the artists. Under the Weimar government of the 1920s, Germany emerged as a leading center of the avant-garde. It was the birthplace of Expressionism in painting and sculpture, of the atonal musical compositions of Arnold Schoenberg, and the jazz-influenced work of Paul Hindemith and Kurt Weill. Films such as Robert Wiene's The Cabinet of Dr. Caligari (1920) and F. W. Murnau's Nosferatu (1922) brought Expressionism to cinema.

In the visual arts, such innovations as Fauvism, Cubism, Dada, and Surrealism—following Symbolism and Post-Impressionism—were not universally appreciated. The majority of people in Germany, as elsewhere, did not care for the new art, which many resented as elitist, morally suspect, and too often incomprehensible. Artistic rejection of traditional authority, intimately linked to the Industrial Revolution, the individualistic values of the Age of Enlightenment and the advance of democracy as the preferred form of government, was exhilarating to some. However, it proved extremely threatening to others, as it took away the security they felt under the older way of things.

Wilhelm II, who took an active interest in regulating art in Germany, criticized Impressionism as "gutter painting" (Gossenmalerei) and forbade Käthe Kollwitz from being awarded a medal for her print series A Weavers' Revolt when it was displayed in the Berlin Grand Exhibition of the Arts in 1898. In 1913, the Prussian house of representatives passed a resolution "against degeneracy in art".

The Nazis viewed the culture of the Weimar period with disgust. Their response stemmed partly from a conservative aesthetic taste and partly from their determination to use culture as a propaganda tool. On both counts, a painting such as Otto Dix's War Cripples (1920) was anathema to them. It unsparingly depicts four badly disfigured veterans of the First World War, then a familiar sight on Berlin's streets, rendered in caricatured style. (In 1937, it would be displayed in the Degenerate Art exhibition next to a label accusing Dix—himself a volunteer in World War I—of "an insult to the German heroes of the Great War".)

Art historian Henry Grosshans says that Hitler "saw Greek and Roman art as uncontaminated by Jewish influences. Modern art was [seen as] an act of aesthetic violence by the Jews against the German spirit. Such was true to Hitler even though only Liebermann, Meidner, Freundlich, and Marc Chagall, among those who made significant contributions to the German modernist movement, were Jewish. But Hitler ... took upon himself the responsibility of deciding who, in matters of culture, thought and acted like a Jew." The supposedly "Jewish" nature of all art that was indecipherable, distorted, or that represented "depraved" subject matter was explained through the concept of degeneracy, which held that distorted and corrupted art was a symptom of an inferior race. By propagating the theory of degeneracy, the Nazis combined their antisemitism with their drive to control the culture, thus consolidating public support for both campaigns.

== Nazi purge ==
Once in control of the government, the Nazis moved to suppress modern art styles and to promote art with national and racial themes. Various Weimar-era art personalities, including Renner, Huelsenbeck, and the Bauhaus designers, were marginalized.

In 1930 Wilhelm Frick, a Nazi, became Minister for Culture and Education in the state of Thuringia. By his order, 70 mostly Expressionist paintings were removed from the permanent exhibition of the Weimar Schlossmuseum in 1930, and the director of the König Albert Museum in Zwickau, Hildebrand Gurlitt, was dismissed for displaying modern art.

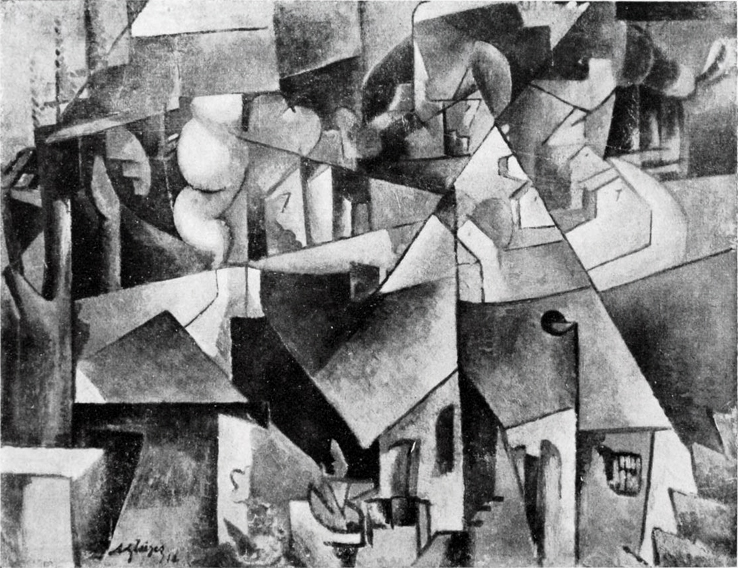
Albert Gleizes, 1912, Landschaft bei Paris, Paysage près de Paris, Paysage de Courbevoie, missing from Hannover since 1937

Jean Metzinger, 1913, En Canot (Im Boot), oil on canvas, 146 x 114 cm, confiscated by the Nazis c. 1936 and displayed at the Degenerate Art Exhibition in Munich. The painting has been missing ever since.

Hitler's rise to power on 30 January 1933, was quickly followed by the censorship of modern art: book burnings were organized, artists and musicians were dismissed from teaching positions, and curators who had shown a partiality for modern art were replaced by Party members. On April 1, 1933, Reich Propaganda Minister Joseph Goebbels publicly attacked in Volksparole the most important dealer of modern art, Alfred Flechtheim, who, like many dealers and collectors of "degenerate art", was Jewish. In September 1933, the Reichskulturkammer (Reich Culture Chamber) was established, with Joseph Goebbels, Hitler's Reichsminister für Volksaufklärung und Propaganda (Reich Minister for Public Enlightenment and Propaganda) in charge. Sub-chambers within the Culture Chamber, representing the individual arts (music, film, literature, architecture, and the visual arts) were created; these were membership groups consisting of "racially pure" artists supportive of the Party, or willing to be compliant. Goebbels made it clear: "In future only those who are members of a chamber are allowed to be productive in our cultural life. Membership is open only to those who fulfill the entrance condition. In this way all unwanted and damaging elements have been excluded." By 1935 the Reich Culture Chamber had 100,000 members.

As dictator, Hitler gave his personal taste in art the force of law to a degree never before seen. Only in Stalin's Soviet Union, where Socialist Realism was the mandatory style, had a modern state shown such concern with regulation of the arts. In the case of Germany, the model was to be classical Greek and Roman art, regarded by Hitler as an art whose exterior form embodied an inner racial ideal. In July 1937, Hitler denounced what he called "cultural Bolshevism", particularly painters who "paint meadows blue, skies green, and clouds sulphur-yellow[…]'One kind of art is artistic and is permitted. The other kind is inartistic and is to be penalized. In the permissible kind of art trees are green, sky blue, and soil is brown. The inartistic art is a hodgepodge of colors."

Nonetheless, during 1933–1934 there was some confusion within the Party on the question of Expressionism. Goebbels and some others believed that the forceful works of such artists as Emil Nolde, Ernst Barlach and Erich Heckel exemplified the Nordic spirit; as Goebbels explained, "We National Socialists are not unmodern; we are the carrier of a new modernity, not only in politics and in social matters, but also in art and intellectual matters." However, a faction led by Alfred Rosenberg despised the Expressionists, and the result was a bitter ideological dispute, which was settled only in September 1934, when Hitler declared that there would be no place for modernist experimentation in the Reich. This edict left many artists initially uncertain as to their status. The work of the Expressionist painter Emil Nolde, a committed member of the Nazi party, continued to be debated even after he was ordered to cease artistic activity in 1936. For many modernist artists, such as Max Beckmann, Ernst Ludwig Kirchner, and Oskar Schlemmer, it was not until June 1937 that they surrendered any hope that their work would be tolerated by the authorities.

Although books by Franz Kafka could no longer be bought by 1939, works by ideologically suspect authors such as Hermann Hesse and Hans Fallada were widely read. Mass culture was less stringently regulated than high culture, possibly because the authorities feared the consequences of too heavy-handed interference in popular entertainment. Thus, until the outbreak of the war, most Hollywood films could be screened, including It Happened One Night, San Francisco, and Gone with the Wind. While performance of atonal music was banned, the prohibition of jazz was less strictly enforced. Benny Goodman and Django Reinhardt were popular, and leading British and American jazz bands continued to perform in major cities until the war; thereafter, dance bands officially played "swing" rather than the banned jazz.

== Entartete Kunst exhibit ==
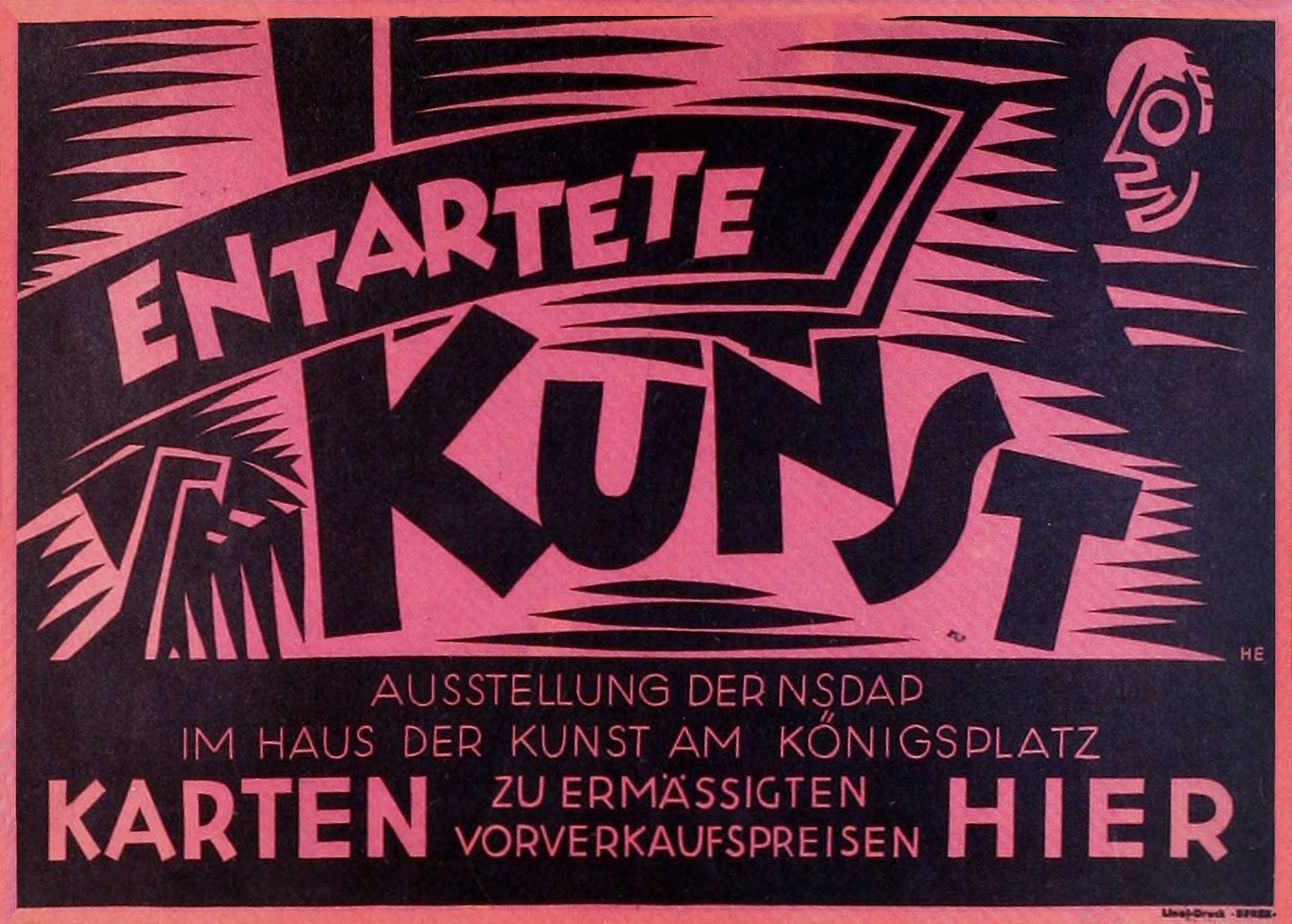
Entartete Kunst poster, Berlin, 1938

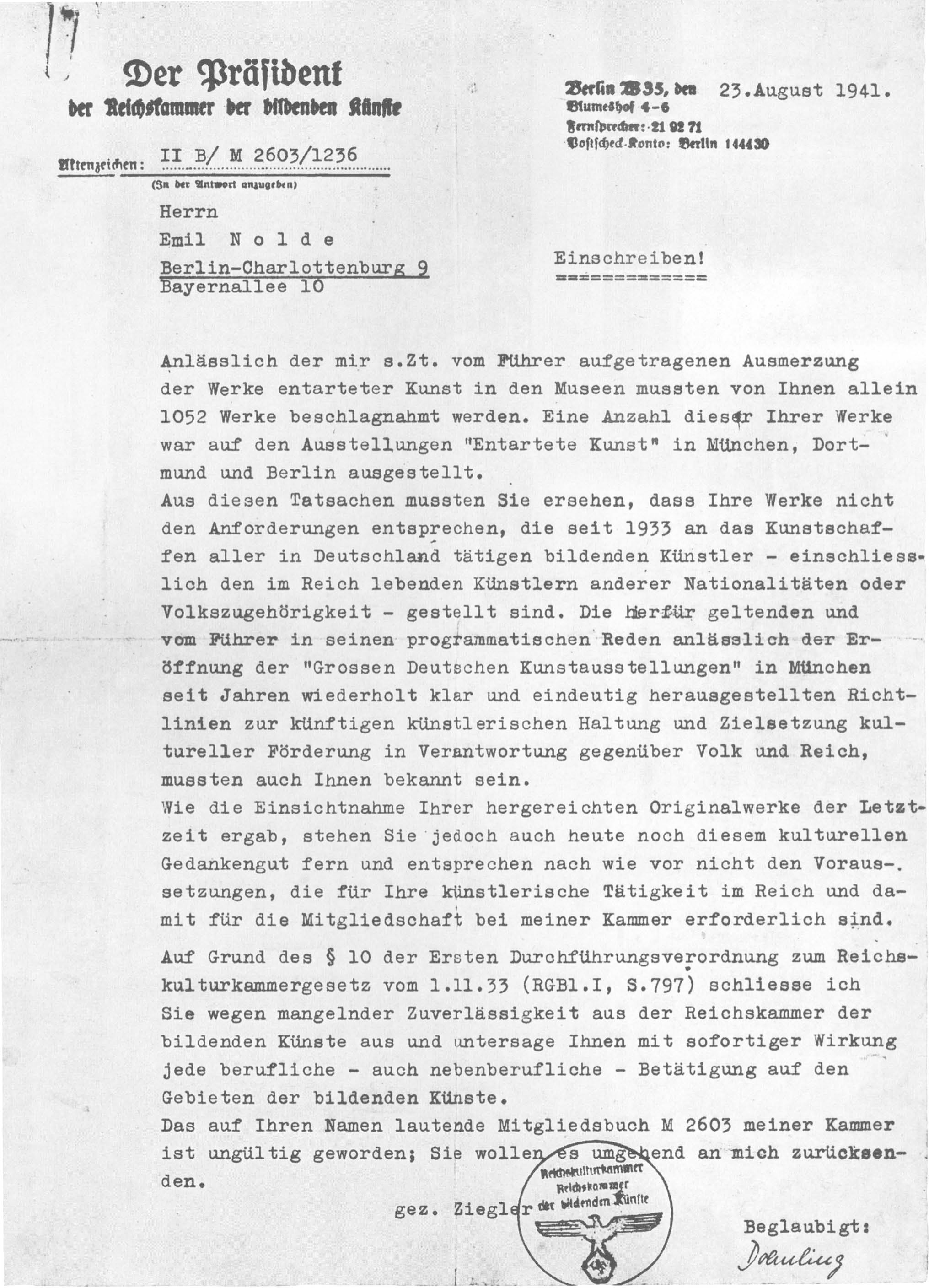
Letter to Emil Nolde in 1941 from Adolf Ziegler, who declares that Nolde's art is degenerate art, and forbids him to paint

By 1937, the concept of degeneracy was firmly entrenched in Nazi policy. On 30 June of that year Goebbels put Adolf Ziegler, the head of Reichskammer der Bildenden Künste (Reich Chamber of Visual Art), in charge of a six-man commission authorized to confiscate from museums and art collections throughout the Reich, any remaining art deemed modern, degenerate, or subversive. These works were then to be presented to the public in an exhibit intended to incite further revulsion against the "perverse Jewish spirit" penetrating German culture.

Over 5000 works were seized, including 1052 by Nolde, 759 by Heckel, 639 by Ernst Ludwig Kirchner and 508 by Max Beckmann, as well as smaller numbers of works by such artists as Alexander Archipenko, Marc Chagall, James Ensor, Albert Gleizes, Henri Matisse, Jean Metzinger, Pablo Picasso, and Vincent van Gogh. The Entartete Kunst exhibit, featuring over 650 paintings, sculptures, prints, and books from the collections of 32 German museums, premiered in Munich on 19 July 1937, and remained on view until 30 November, before traveling to 11 other cities in Germany and Austria.

The exhibit was held on the second floor of a building formerly occupied by the Institute of Archaeology. Viewers had to reach the exhibit by means of a narrow staircase. The first sculpture was an oversized, theatrical portrait of Jesus, which purposely intimidated viewers as they literally bumped into it in order to enter. The rooms were made of temporary partitions and deliberately chaotic and overfilled. Pictures were crowded together, sometimes unframed, usually hung by cord.

The first three rooms were grouped thematically. The first room contained works considered demeaning of religion; the second featured works by Jewish artists in particular; the third contained works deemed insulting to the women, soldiers and farmers of Germany. The rest of the exhibit had no particular theme.

There were slogans painted on the walls. For example:

- Insolent mockery of the Divine under Centrist rule
- Revelation of the Jewish racial soul
- An insult to German womanhood
- The ideal—cretin and whore
- Deliberate sabotage of national defense
- German farmers—a Yiddish view
- The Jewish longing for the wilderness reveals itself—in Germany the Negro becomes the racial ideal of a degenerate art
- Madness becomes method
- Nature as seen by sick minds
- Even museum bigwigs called this the "art of the German people"

Speeches of Nazi party leaders contrasted with artist manifestos from various art movements, such as Dada and Surrealism. Next to many paintings were labels indicating how much money a museum spent to acquire the artwork. In the case of paintings acquired during the post-war Weimar hyperinflation of the early 1920s, when the cost of a kilogram loaf of bread reached 233 billion German marks, the prices of the paintings were of course greatly exaggerated. The exhibit was designed to promote the idea that modernism was a conspiracy by people who hated German decency, frequently identified as Jewish-Bolshevist, although only 6 of the 112 artists included in the exhibition were in fact Jewish.

The exhibition program contained photographs of modern artworks accompanied by defamatory text. The cover featured the exhibition title—with the word "Kunst", meaning art, in scare quotes—superimposed on an image of Otto Freundlich's sculpture Der Neue Mensch.

A few weeks after the opening of the exhibition, Goebbels ordered a second and more thorough scouring of German art collections; inventory lists indicate that the artworks seized in this second round, combined with those gathered prior to the exhibition, amounted to 16,558 works.

Coinciding with the Entartete Kunst exhibition, the Große Deutsche Kunstausstellung (Great German art exhibition) made its premiere amid much pageantry. This exhibition, held at the palatial Haus der deutschen Kunst (House of German Art), displayed the work of officially approved artists such as Arno Breker and Adolf Wissel. At the end of four months Entartete Kunst had attracted over two million visitors, nearly three and a half times the number that visited the nearby Große Deutsche Kunstausstellung.

== Fate of the artists and their work ==
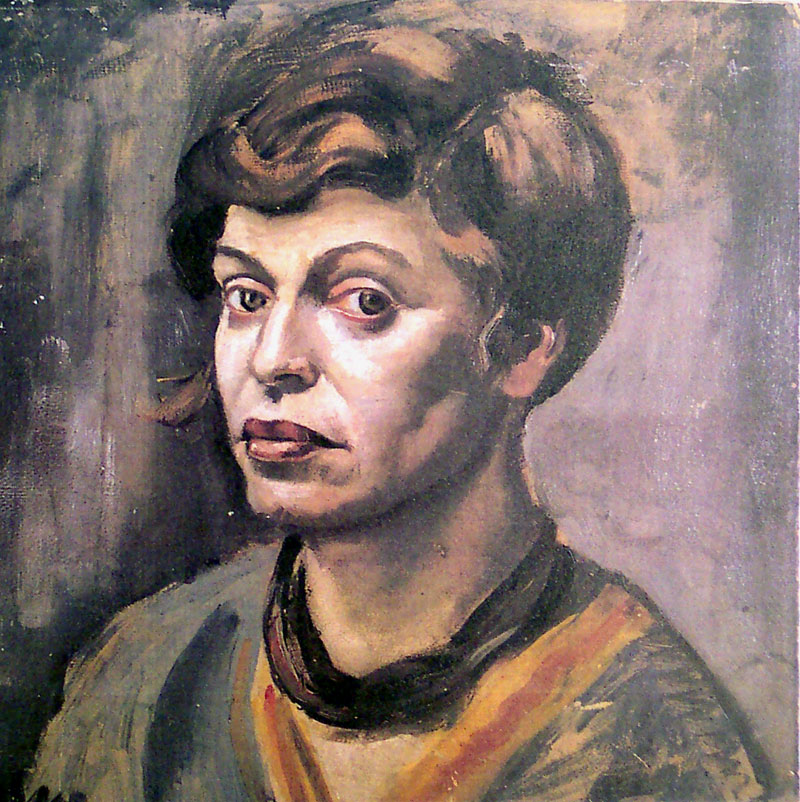
Self-portrait by Elfriede Lohse-Wächtler, who was murdered at Sonnenstein Euthanasia Centre in 1940

Avant-garde German artists were branded both enemies of the state and a threat to German culture. Many went into exile. Max Beckmann fled to Amsterdam on the opening day of the Entartete Kunst exhibit. Max Ernst emigrated to America with the assistance of Peggy Guggenheim. Ernst Ludwig Kirchner committed suicide in Switzerland in 1938. Paul Klee spent his years in exile in Switzerland, yet was unable to obtain Swiss citizenship because of his status as a degenerate artist. A leading German dealer, Alfred Flechtheim, died penniless in exile in London in 1937.

Other artists remained in internal exile. Otto Dix was dismissed from his professorship in Dresden in 1933. He then retreated to the countryside to paint unpeopled landscapes in a meticulous style that would not provoke the authorities. The Reichskulturkammer forbade artists such as Edgar Ende and Emil Nolde from purchasing painting materials. Those who remained in Germany were forbidden to work at universities and were subject to surprise raids by the Gestapo in order to ensure that they were not violating the ban on producing artwork; Nolde secretly carried on painting, but using only watercolors (so as not to be betrayed by the telltale odor of oil paint). Although officially no artists were put to death because of their work, those of Jewish descent who did not escape from Germany in time were sent to concentration camps. Others were murdered in the Action T4 (see, for example, Elfriede Lohse-Wächtler).

After the exhibit, only the most valuable paintings were sorted out to be included in the auction held by Galerie Theodor Fischer (auctioneer) in Luzern, Switzerland, on 30 June 1939 at the Grand Hotel National. The sale consisted of artworks seized from German public museums; some pieces from the sale were acquired by museums, others by private collectors such as Maurice Wertheim who acquired the 1888 self-portrait by Vincent van Gogh that was seized from the Neue Staatsgalerie in Munich belonging to today's Bavarian State Painting Collections. Nazi officials took many for their private use: for example, Hermann Göring took 14 valuable pieces, including a Van Gogh and a Cézanne. In March 1939, the Berlin Fire Brigade burned about 4,000 paintings, drawings and prints that had apparently little value on the international market. This was an act of unprecedented vandalism, although the Nazis were well used to book burnings on a large scale.

A large amount of "degenerate art" by Picasso, Dalí, Ernst, Klee, Léger and Miró was destroyed in a bonfire on the night of 27 July 1942, in the gardens of the Galerie nationale du Jeu de Paume in Paris. Whereas it was forbidden to export "degenerate art" to Germany, it was still possible to buy and sell artworks of "degenerate artists" in occupied France. The Nazis considered indeed that they should not be concerned by Frenchmen's mental health. As a consequence, many works made by these artists were sold at the main French auction house during the occupation.

The couple Sophie and Emanuel Fohn, who exchanged the works for harmless works of art from their own possession and kept them in safe custody throughout the National Socialist era, saved about 250 works by ostracized artists. The collection survived in South Tyrol from 1943 and was handed over to the Bavarian State Painting Collections in 1964.

After the collapse of Nazi Germany and the invasion of Berlin by the Red Army, some artwork from the exhibit was found buried underground. It is unclear how many of these then reappeared in the Hermitage Museum in Saint Petersburg, where they still remain.

In 2010, as work began to extend an underground line from Alexanderplatz through the historic city centre to the Brandenburg Gate, a number of sculptures from the degenerate art exhibition were unearthed in the cellar of a private house close to the "Rote Rathaus". These included, for example, the bronze cubist-style statue of a female dancer by the artist Marg Moll, and are on display at the Neues Museum.

== Artists in the 1937 Munich show ==
- Jankel Adler
- Hans Baluschek
- Ernst Barlach
- Rudolf Bauer
- Philipp Bauknecht
- Otto Baum
- Willi Baumeister
- Herbert Bayer
- Max Beckmann
- Rudolf Belling
- Paul Bindel
- Theodor Brün
- Max Burchartz
- Fritz Burger-Mühlfeld
- Paul Camenisch
- Heinrich Campendonk
- Karl Caspar
- Maria Caspar-Filser
- Pol Cassel
- Marc Chagall
- Lovis Corinth
- Heinrich Maria Davringhausen
- Walter Dexel
- Johannes Diesner
- Otto Dix
- Pranas Domšaitis
- Hans Christoph Drexel
- Johannes Driesch
- Heinrich Eberhard
- Max Ernst
- Hans Feibusch
- Lyonel Feininger
- Conrad Felixmüller
- Otto Freundlich
- Xaver Fuhr
- Ludwig Gies
- Werner Gilles
- Otto Gleichmann
- Rudolf Großmann
- George Grosz
- Hans Grundig
- Rudolf Haizmann
- Raoul Hausmann
- Guido Hebert
- Erich Heckel
- Wilhelm Heckrott
- Jacoba van Heemskerck
- Hans Siebert von Heister
- Oswald Herzog
- Werner Heuser
- Heinrich Hoerle
- Karl Hofer
- Eugen Hoffmann
- Johannes Itten
- Alexej von Jawlensky
- Eric Johansson
- Hans Jürgen Kallmann
- Wassily Kandinsky
- Hanns Katz
- Ernst Ludwig Kirchner
- Paul Klee
- Cesar Klein
- Paul Kleinschmidt
- Oskar Kokoschka
- Otto Lange
- Wilhelm Lehmbruck
- Elfriede Lohse-Wächtler
- El Lissitzky
- Oskar Lüthy
- Franz Marc
- Gerhard Marcks
- Ewald Mataré
- Ludwig Meidner
- Jean Metzinger
- Constantin von Mitschke-Collande
- László Moholy-Nagy
- Marg Moll
- Oskar Moll
- Johannes Molzahn
- Piet Mondrian
- Georg Muche
- Otto Mueller
- Magda Nachman Acharya
- Erich Nagel
- Heinrich Nauen
- Ernst Wilhelm Nay
- Karel Niestrath
- Emil Nolde
- Otto Pankok
- Max Pechstein
- Max Peiffer Watenphul
- Hans Purrmann
- Max Rauh
- Hans Richter
- Emy Roeder
- Christian Rohlfs
- Edwin Scharff
- Oskar Schlemmer
- Rudolf Schlichter
- Karl Schmidt-Rottluff
- Werner Scholz
- Lothar Schreyer
- Otto Schubert
- Kurt Schwitters
- Lasar Segall
- Fritz Skade
- Heinrich Stegemann
- Fritz Stuckenberg
- Paul Thalheimer
- Johannes Tietz
- Arnold Topp
- Friedrich Vordemberge-Gildewart
- Karl Völker
- Christoph Voll
- William Wauer
- Gert Heinrich Wollheim

== Artistic movements condemned as degenerate ==
- Bauhaus
- Cubism
- Dada
- Expressionism
- Fauvism
- Impressionism
- Post-Impressionism
- New Objectivity
- Surrealism

== Listing ==
The Reichsministerium für Volksaufklärung und Propaganda (Reich Ministry of Public Enlightenment and Propaganda) compiled a 479-page, two-volume typewritten listing of the works confiscated as "degenerate" from Germany's public institutions in 1937–38. In 1996 the Victoria and Albert Museum in London acquired the only known surviving copy of the complete listing. The document was donated to the V&A's National Art Library by Elfriede Fischer, the widow of the art dealer Heinrich Robert ("Harry") Fischer. Copies were made available to other libraries and research organisations at the time, and much of the information was subsequently incorporated into a database maintained by the Freie Universität Berlin.

A digital reproduction of the entire inventory was published on the Victoria and Albert Museum's website in January 2014. The V&A's publication consists of two PDFs, one for each of the original volumes. Both PDFs also include an introduction in English and German. An online version of the inventory was made available on the V&A's website in November 2019, with additional features. The new edition uses IIIF page-turning software and incorporates an interactive index arranged by city and museum. The earlier PDF edition remains available too.

The V&A's copy of the full inventory is thought to have been compiled in 1941 or 1942, after the sales and disposals were completed. Two copies of an earlier version of Volume 1 (A–G) also survive in the German Federal Archives in Berlin, and one of these is annotated to show the fate of individual artworks. Until the V&A obtained the complete inventory in 1996, all versions of Volume 2 (G–Z) were thought to have been destroyed. The listings are arranged alphabetically by city, museum and artist. Details include artist surname, inventory number, title and medium, followed by a code indicating the fate of the artwork, then the surname of the buyer or art dealer (if any) and any price paid. The entries also include abbreviations to indicate whether the work was included in any of the various Entartete Kunst exhibitions (see Degenerate Art Exhibition) or Der ewige Jude (see The Eternal Jew (art exhibition)).

The main dealers mentioned are Bernhard A. Böhmer (or Boehmer), Karl Buchholz, Hildebrand Gurlitt, and Ferdinand Möller. The manuscript also contains entries for many artworks acquired by the artist Emanuel Fohn, in exchange for other works.

== 21st-century reactions ==
Neil Levi, writing in The Chronicle of Higher Education, suggested that the branding of art as "degenerate" was only partly an aesthetic aim of the Nazis. Another was the confiscation of valuable artwork, a deliberate means to enrich the regime.

== In popular culture ==
A Picasso, a play by Jeffrey Hatcher based loosely on actual events, is set in Paris 1941 and sees Picasso being asked to authenticate three works for inclusion in an upcoming exhibition of degenerate art.

In the 1964 film The Train, a German Army colonel attempts to steal hundreds of "degenerate" paintings from Paris before it is liberated during World War II.

== See also ==
- Nazi book burnings
- Art of the Third Reich
- Degenerate music
- Gurlitt Collection
- Karl Buchholz (art dealer)
- Low culture
- Nazi plunder
- Paintings by Adolf Hitler
