= Oskar Lüthy =

Swiss painter (1882–1945)

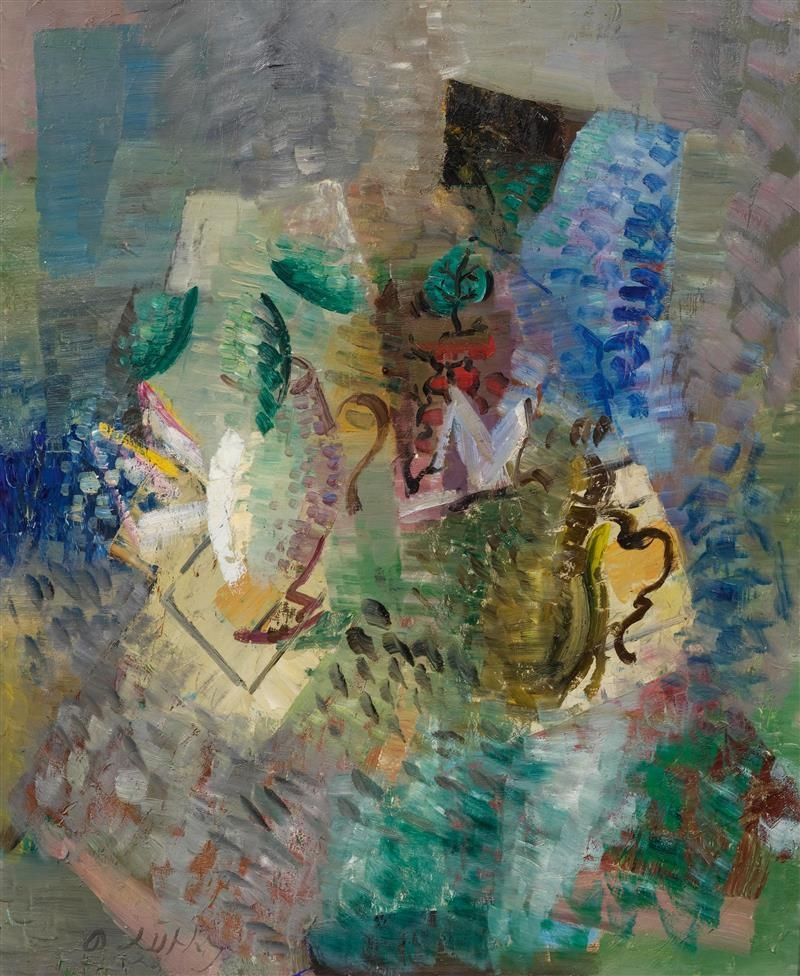
Opus VII, 1928 still-life by Oskar Lüthy 81 x 65.5 cm, oil on board

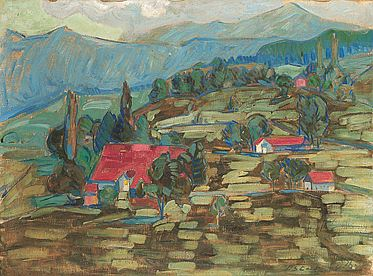
Landscape with houses and trees by Lüthy

Oskar Wilhelm Lüthy (26 June 1882 – 1 October 1945) was a Swiss painter of still lifes, landscapes and religious art. He co-founded Der Moderne Bund ("The Modern Covenant"), a group of Swiss modernist artists.

Lüthy briefly studied architecture at the Berne School of Applied Arts. From 1903 to 1907 he lived in the Valais, where he painted pictures of mountain landscapes en plein air. After his stay in Valais, he took private painting classes with Hans Lietzmann in Munich, where he came into contact with religious art.

In 1911 he co-founded the artist group Der Moderne Bund in Weggis with sculptor Jean Arp and painter Walter Helbig. They aimed to bring the avant-garde to a wider audience and "sought expression of their personalities in the realm of Expressionism". Paul Klee, Wilhelm Gimmi and Hermann Huber joined the group soon after. Lüthy attended three exhibitions with Der Moderne Bund.

After traveling to Italy and Paris, he settled in Zurich, where from 1918 to 1920 he participated in exhibitions of the "New Life" artists' association. In 1920 he signed the Dada Manifesto.

Through his friendship with the painter Otto Meyer-Amden he turned increasingly to Anthroposophy and Christian mysticism. In 1925 the Dresden City Museum bought a Madonna of Lüthy's. The museum was seized by the Nazis in 1933 and the painting was shown as an example of "Degenerate Art" at the Eintartete Kunst exhibitions.

Lüthy received many commissions from by Swiss religious institutions, his last major work was the altarpiece for the Church of Christ in Oerlikon in 1941–42. He died in Zurich in 1945.
