= Hanns Katz =

German painter

A self-portrait by Katz, c.1930

Hanns Ludwig Katz (1892–1940) was a German expressionist painter and graphic artist.

Katz was born in Karlsruhe in 1892. In 1912 he visited Henri Matisse's studio for a few weeks. From 1913 to 1918 Katz studied art, first at the Karlsruhe academy, and then in Munich. He married and moved to Frankfurt, where in 1920 he published the Danse macabre, a series of expressionist lithographs which alluded to the German Revolution of 1918–1919. Katz's work, which consisted of portraits, cityscapes, and still lifes, was influenced by Max Beckmann and the New Objectivity (Neue Sachlichkeit) movement.

In 1923, facing financial troubles, Katz became a partner in a whitewashing company, where he worked until 1936. After the Nazis came to power in 1933, Katz was heavily involved in the Jüdischer Kulturbund, a cultural federation of German Jews that hired thousands of artists, musicians, and actors fired from German institutions.

In 1934 his wife died, and the next year he started preparations for the foundation of a semi-autonomous Jewish settlement in Yugoslavia. The plans fell through, so in 1936 he immigrated to South Africa.

After he left Germany, an expressionist portrait of Gustav Landauer, considered one of Katz's best, was publicly denounced as degenerate art by the Nazis.

In his new homeland Katz concentrated on painting landscapes, but did not have much success in the South African art scene. He died in Johannesburg in 1940.

== Gallery ==
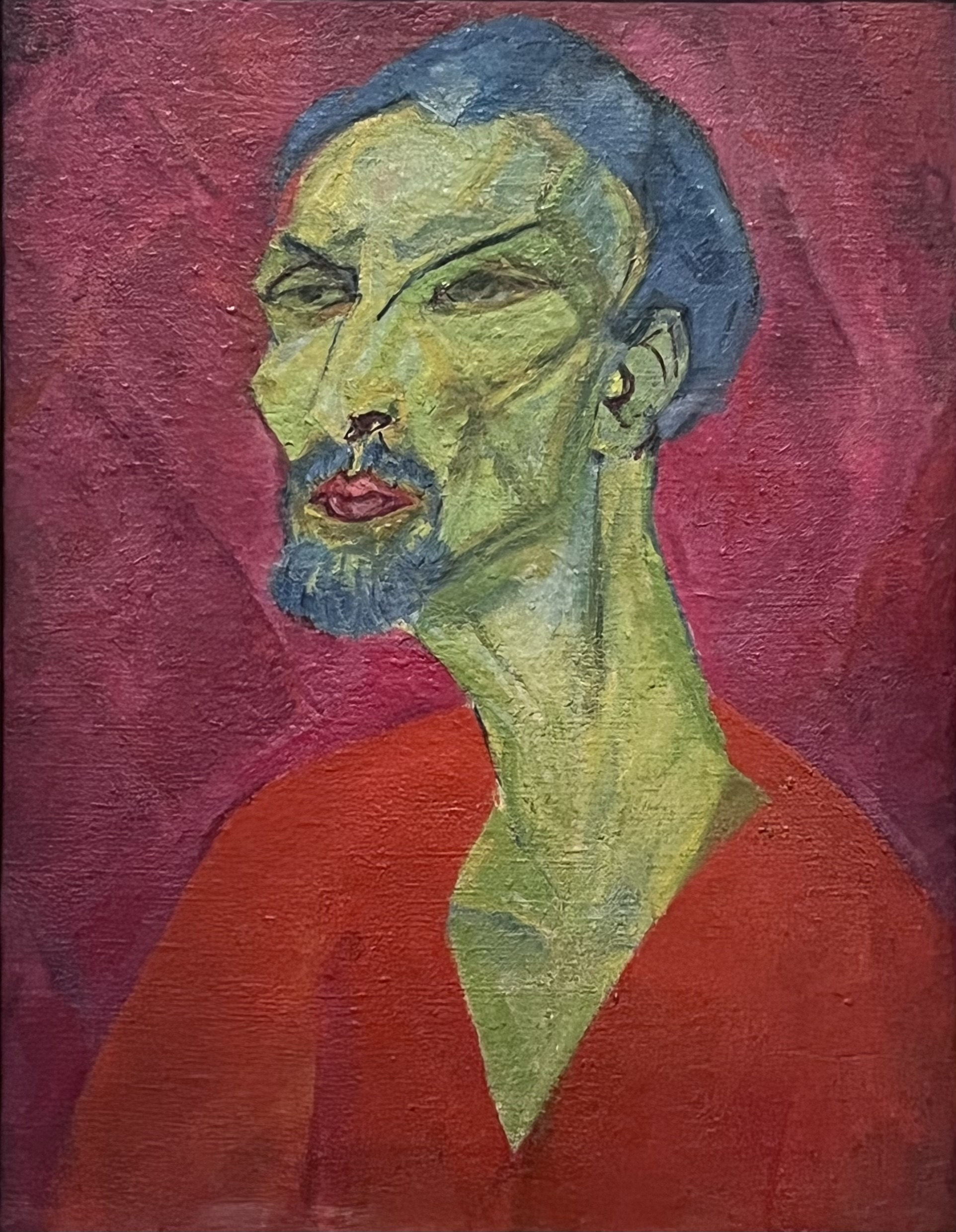
Male portrait ca.1920

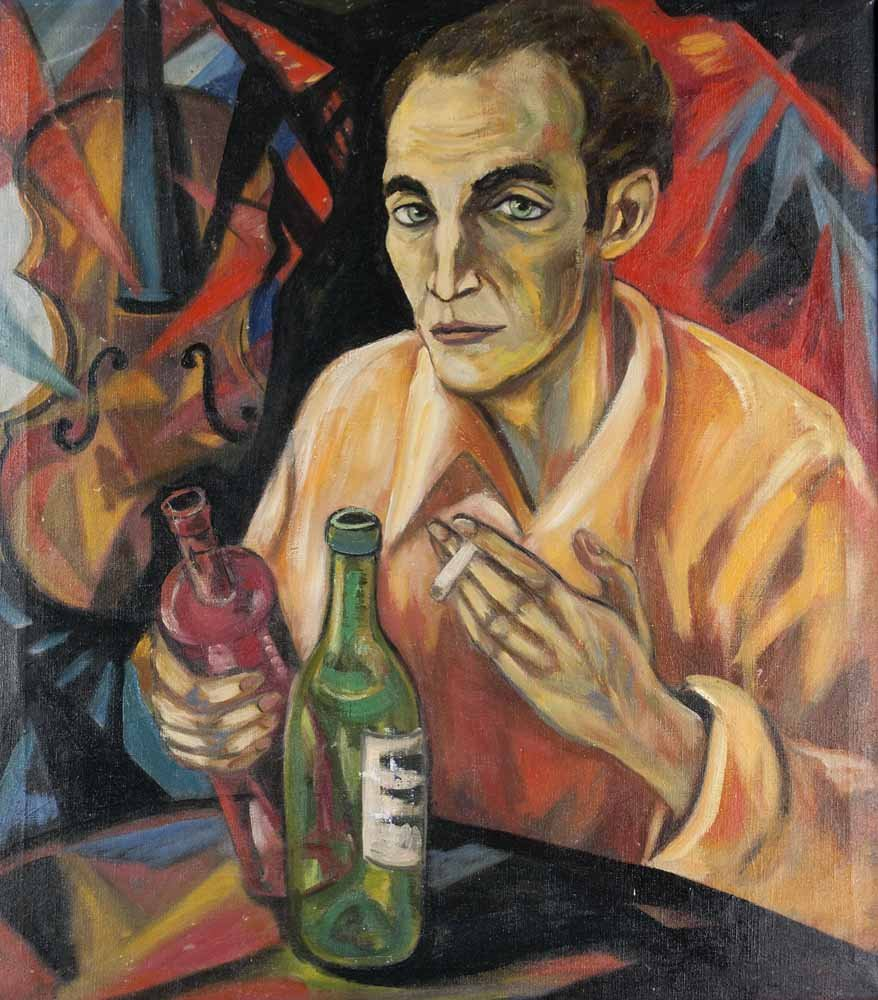
Self - Portrait with cigarette, 1930

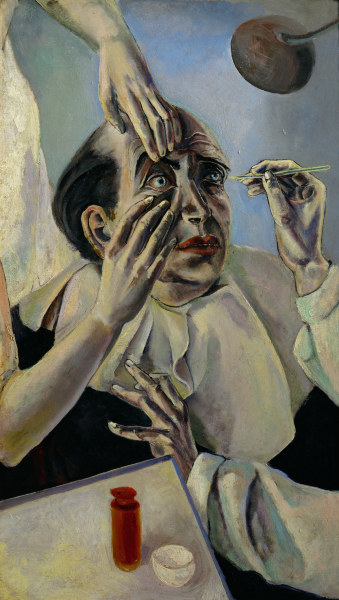
Eye surgery 1929

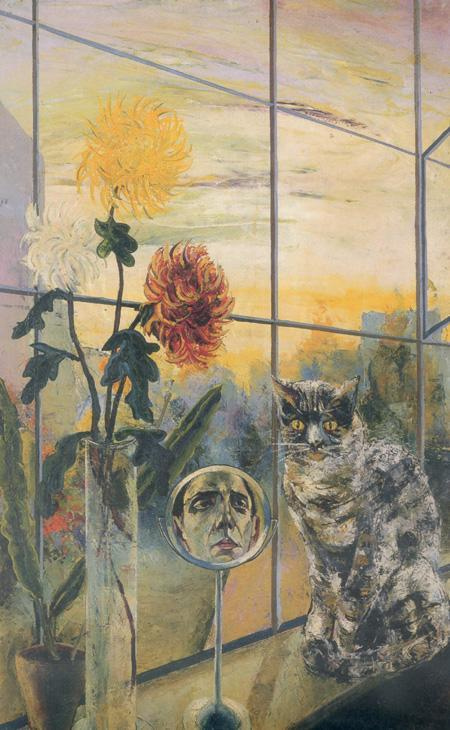
Self portrait
