= Der Neue Mensch =

Destroyed sculpture by Otto Freundlich

Der Neue Mensch reproduced on the cover of the catalogue of the Nazi Degenerate Art Exhibition, 1937

Large Head (The New Man) (German: Großer Kopf (Der Neue Mensch)) was a sculpture made by the German artist Otto Freundlich in 1912 and thought to have been destroyed in around 1941. It is now considered to be one of the most important modernist sculptures made in Germany before the First World War.

== Degenerate art ==
Freundlich was born into a Jewish family in Prussia in 1878. He decided to become an artist and moved to Paris in 1908, but he made the sculpture in Hamburg in 1912 during one of his periodic trips back to Germany. The work was made in plaster and stood 1.39 metres (4 ft 7 in) tall. Freundlich was influenced by Cubism and possibly also Rodin's 1890s bronze sculpture, Monumental Head of Iris, as well as "primitive" tribal art, like the masks in Picasso's 1907 painting Les Demoiselles d'Avignon. The work bears a resemblance to the moai stone head statues from Easter Island. He sold the work to a private collector in Hamburg soon after it was made in 1912. It was donated to the Museum für Kunst und Gewerbe Hamburg (Hamburg Museum of Arts and Crafts) in 1930.

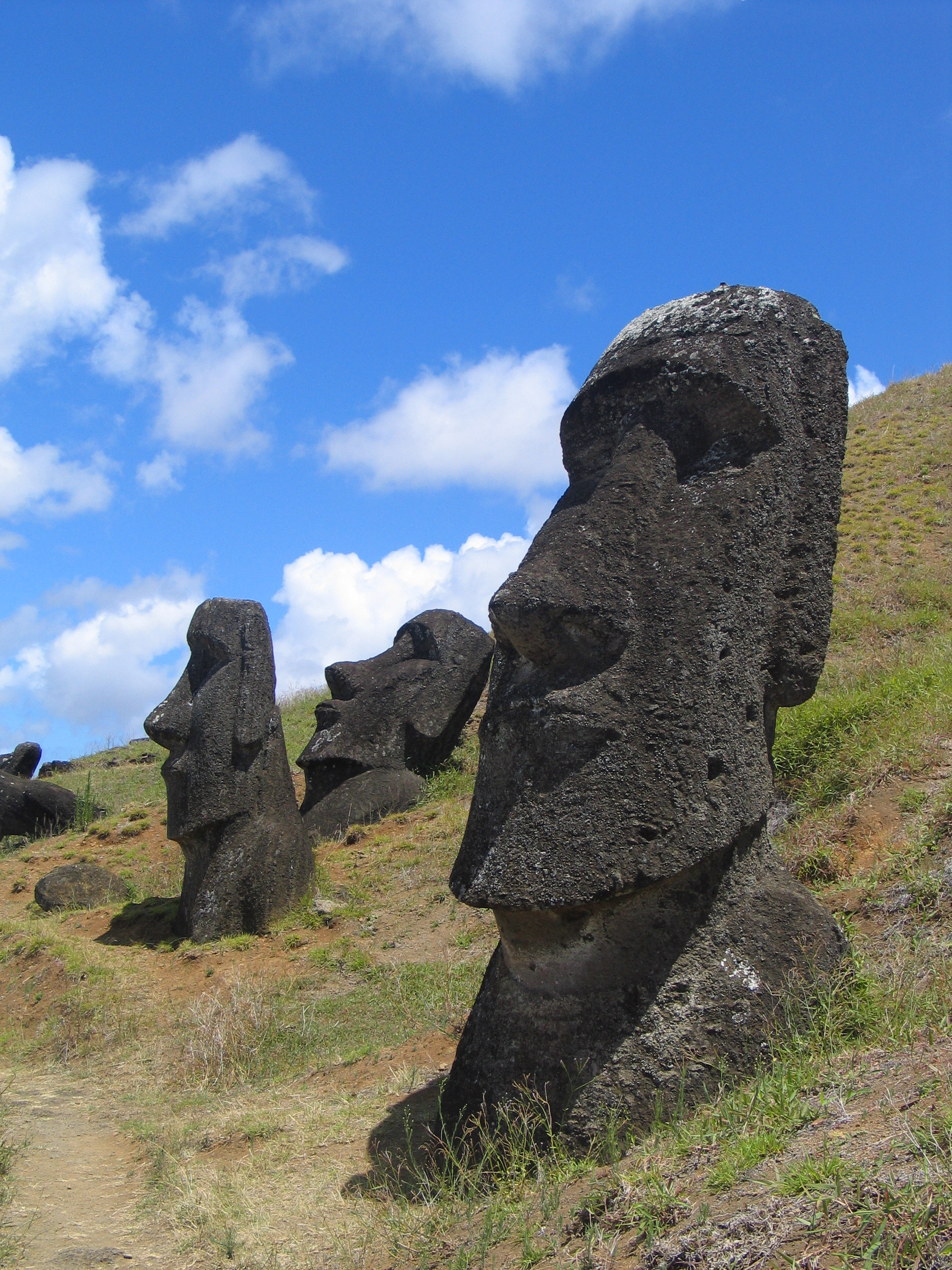
Moai set in the hillside at Rano Raraku on Easter Island

Modern artworks, particularly those influenced by primitivism, were considered Entartete Kunst (degenerate art) by the Nazi regime, and Freundlich's sculpture was withdrawn from display soon after the Nazis gained power in Germany in 1933. It was included in the Degenerate Art Exhibition (Ausstellung "Entartete Kunst") that opened in Munich in 1937, displayed in the ground floor lobby with a wooden work, Der Schmied von Hagen, by Ernst Ludwig Kirchner. It was featured on the cover of the catalogue for the exhibition, which was published in November 1937 and sold for 30 pfennigs, and also included in "Group 8" in the guide, alongside works by two other Jewish artists, a self portrait by Ludwig Meidner and a sculpture by Richard Haizmann. The exhibition went on tour, and was subsequently displayed in eleven other German and Austrian towns until 1941.

The sculpture disappeared in 1941, and it is likely that it was destroyed around that date, although a broken piece of a terracotta sculpture of a head by Freundlich that was also included in the Entartete Kunst exhibition was discovered in a Berlin basement in 2010.

Freundlich spent some years in Germany during and after the First World War, but he returned to Paris in 1925. At the start of the Second World War in 1939, he was interned by the French government as an enemy alien, but released in 1940 at the request of Picasso. He went into hiding together with his partner Jeanne Kosnick-Kloss into the Pyrenees when France was occupied by Germany, but was arrested in 1943. He was sent to Majdanek concentration camp, where he was killed on the day of his arrival on 9 March 1943.
