= Pol Cassel =

German painter (1892–1945)

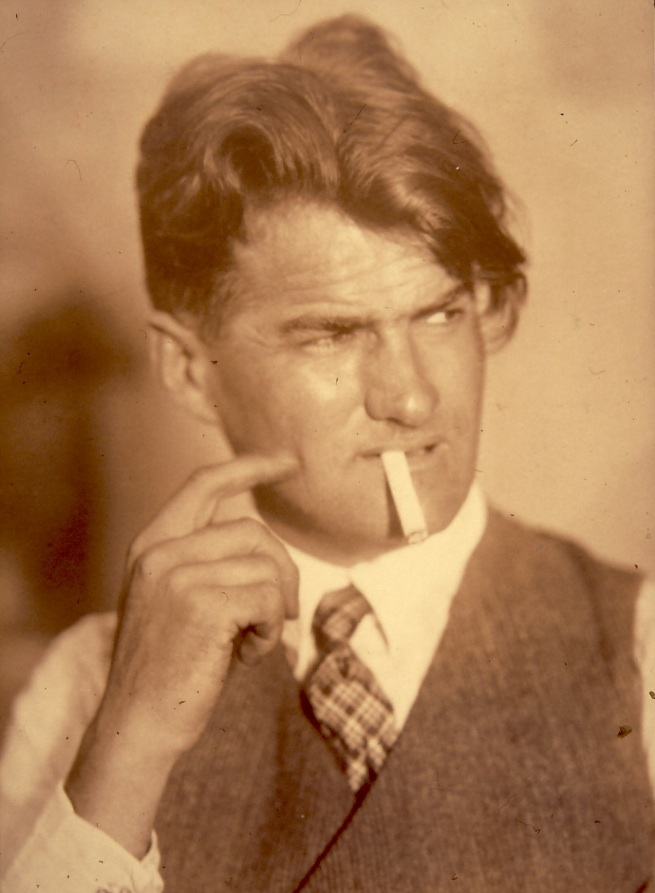
Pol Cassel (1928), photograph by Genja Jonas

Pol Cassel, originally Paul Ernst Karl Cassel (17 March 1892, Munich – 9 September 1945, Chișinău) was a German painter and graphic artist in the "Classical-Modern" style.

== Biography ==
From 1907 to 1914, he attended the arts and crafts schools in Erfurt and Dresden. After serving in the First World War, he joined the circle of artists associated with Conrad Felixmüller; which included Otto Griebel, Otto Dix and Elfriede Lohse-Wächtler. In 1921 he, his wife Susanna and son Ra moved from Dresden to Wehlen, where they lived until 1938. There, they had a second son; Constantin. He created a summer studio at an isolated quarry near Zeichen (a hamlet near Wehlen) where he painted portraits, animals, still-lifes and landscapes.

Hitler's rise to power ended Cassel's career. In 1933, his works were classified as "degenerate art". Many of his paintings were confiscated and shown at the Degenerate Art Exhibition of 1937, in Munich.

In hopes of regaining some positive recognition, he joined the Nazi Party, but the only result of this was the loss of all his friends. The hoped-for rehabilitation never came and he had to work as a manual laborer in the quarries until 1939, when he was assigned to the Hydraulic Engineering Department in Pirna. In March 1944, he was drafted and sent to the Eastern Front, but was soon taken prisoner by the Red Army. He died the following year, in Soviet captivity, in what is now Moldova.

His works were largely forgotten until after 2000. Since then, there have been two major retrospectives; at the Lindenau-Museum (2005) and the Kunsthalle im Lipsius-Bau (2011/12).

== Selected paintings ==
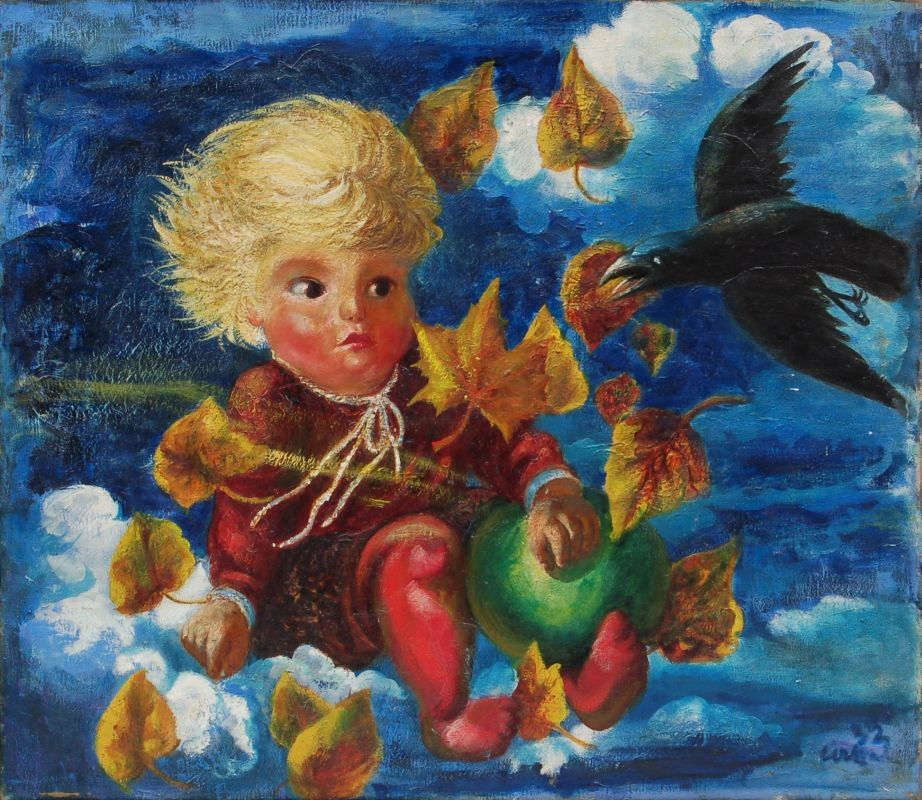
Autumn (Constantin's Dream)

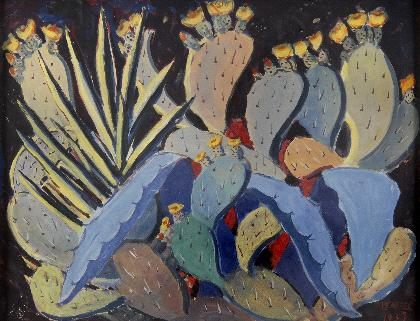
Cacti

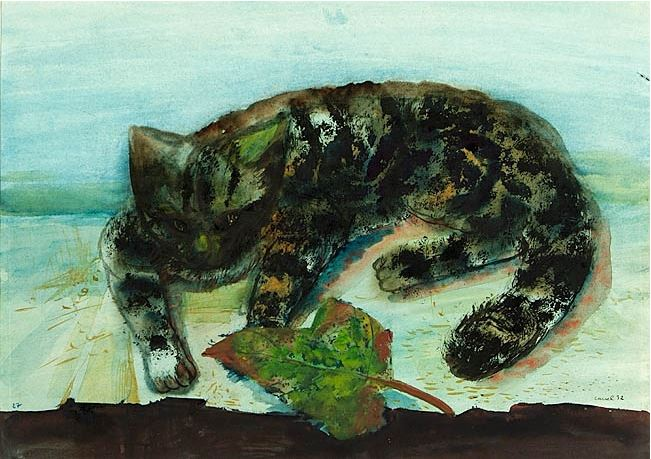
Lying Cat with Maple Leaf

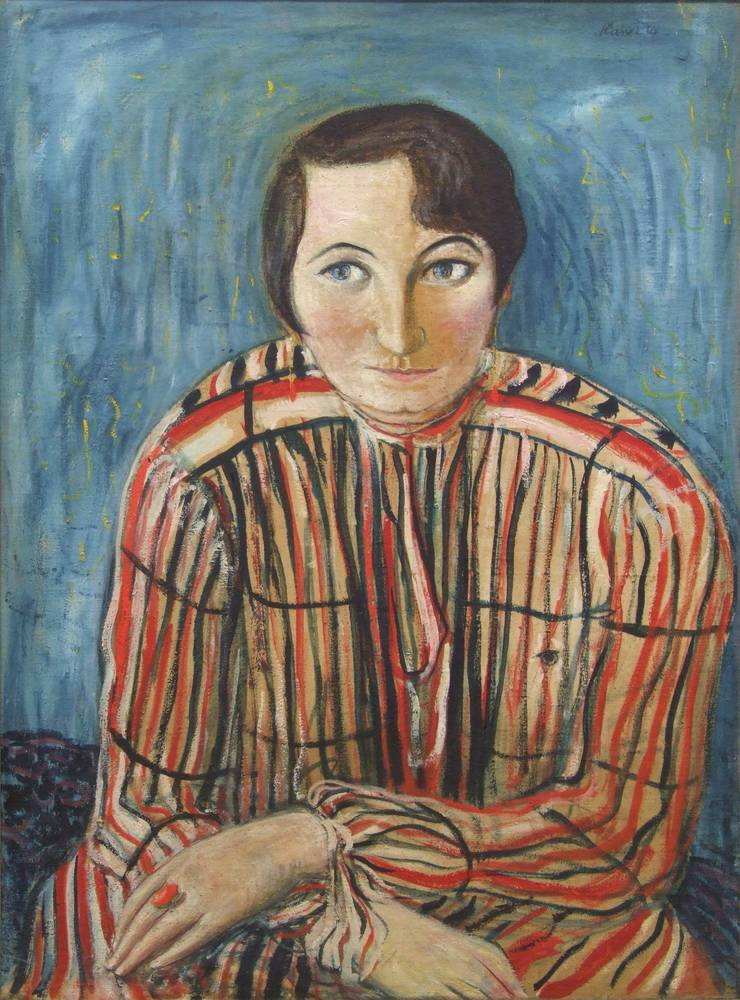
Portrait of Genja Jonas
