= Otto Freundlich =

German painter (1878–1943)

- Otto Freundlich (c. 1931)
- Born: 10 July 1878; Stolp, German Empire
- Died: 9 March 1943 (aged 64); Majdanek concentration camp, General Government (German-occupied Poland)
- Known for: Painting and sculpture

Otto Freundlich (10 July 1878 – 9 March 1943) was a German painter and sculptor of Jewish origin. One of the first generation of abstract artists, Freundlich deeply admired cubism and spent much of his life in France. He was murdered at the Majdanek concentration camp during the Holocaust.

== Life ==
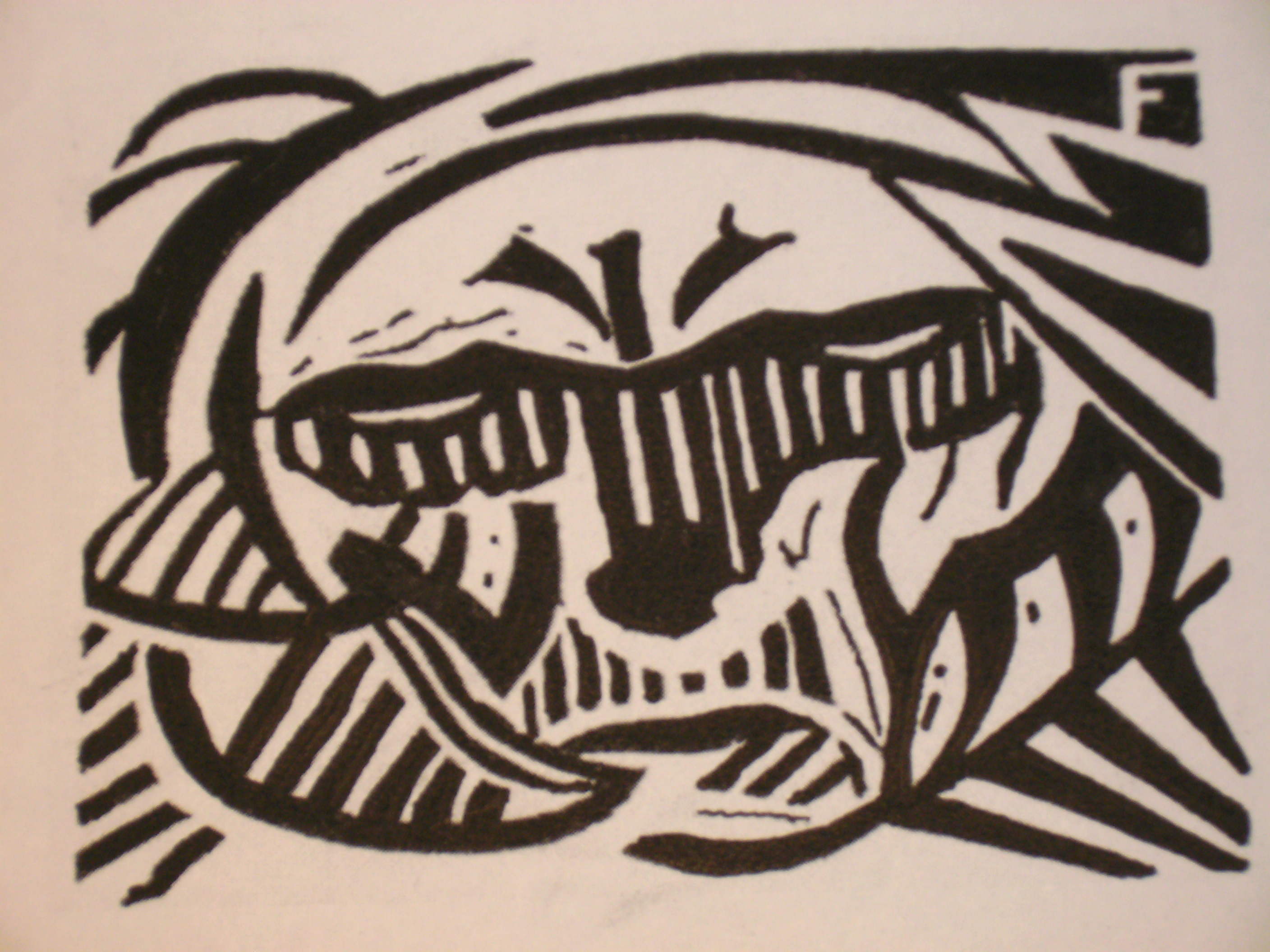
Selbstportrait (Self-portrait), 1918

Freundlich was born in Stolp, Province of Pomerania, Prussia. His mother was writer Samuel Lublinski's cousin.

Trained in dentistry, Freundlich turned to art and moved to Paris in 1908, living at the Bateau-Lavoir with Georges Braque and Pablo Picasso.

He returned to Germany in 1914. After World War I, he joined the socialist November Group. He co-organized the first Dada exhibition in Cologne (1919) with Johannes Theodor Baargeld and Max Ernst.

Freundlich returned to France in 1924 or 1925, joining Abstraction-Création. The Nazis banned his work as "degenerate art", seizing several pieces for the Degenerate Art exhibition; his monumental sculpture Der Neue Mensch (The New Human) was used mockingly as the catalogue cover. (Though now missing and likely destroyed, another of his sculptures was unearthed in 2010 during construction in Berlin and displayed at the Neues Museum.)

He joined the Union des Artistes Allemands Libres. During the occupation, he and his wife fled to the Pyrenees. Interned in Vichy France, he was briefly released through Picasso's intervention. In 1943, he was arrested and deported to the Majdanek concentration camp, where he was murdered upon arrival.

== Legacy ==
A bust honors Freundlich in his hometown, now Słupsk.

Largely neglected since Nazi persecution, his work was covered in the 2012 documentary Das Geht Nur Langsam (It Takes Time), which traces his vision of European streets lined with sculptures embodying utopian ideals.

== Gallery ==
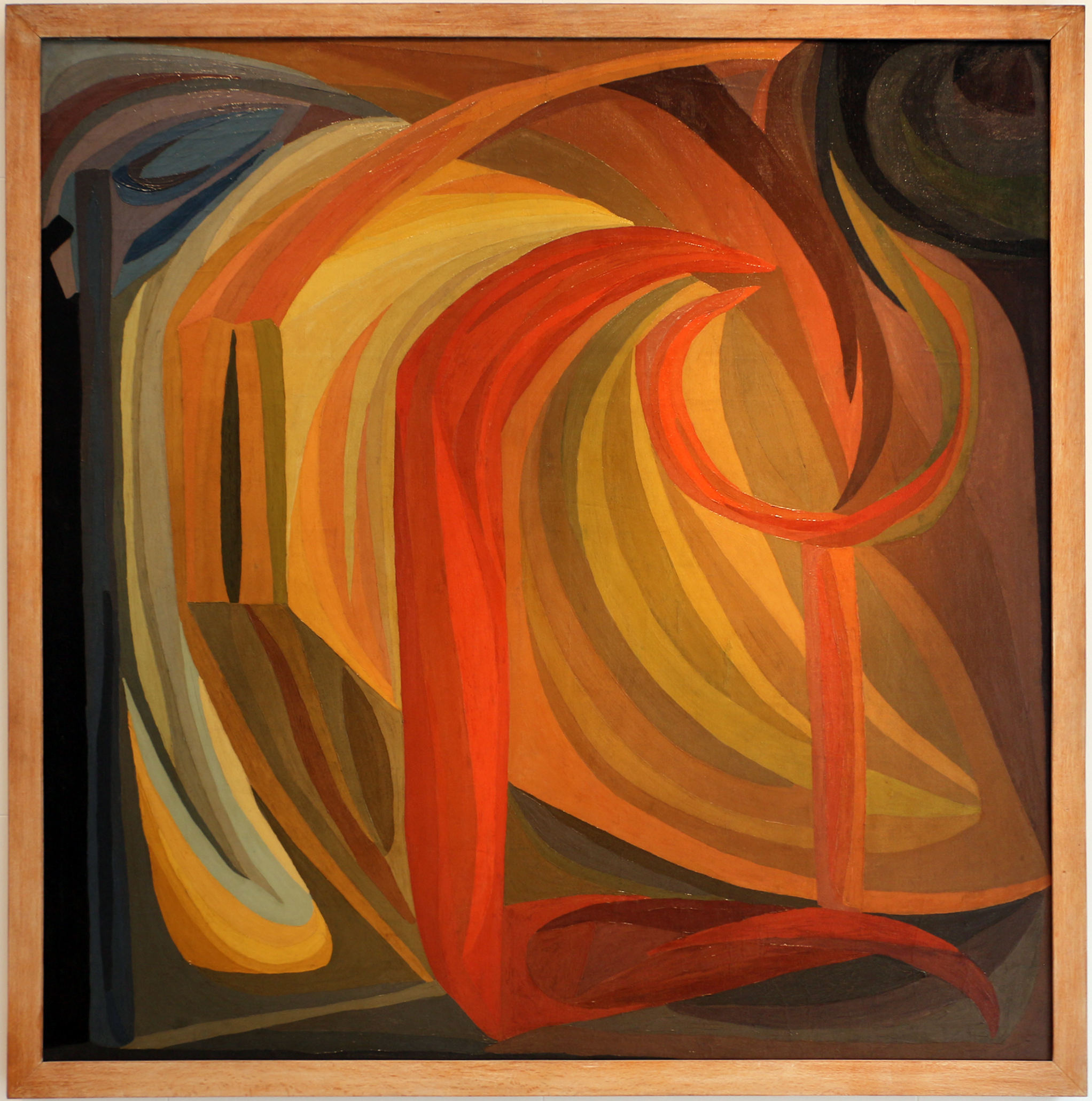
Composition (1911)

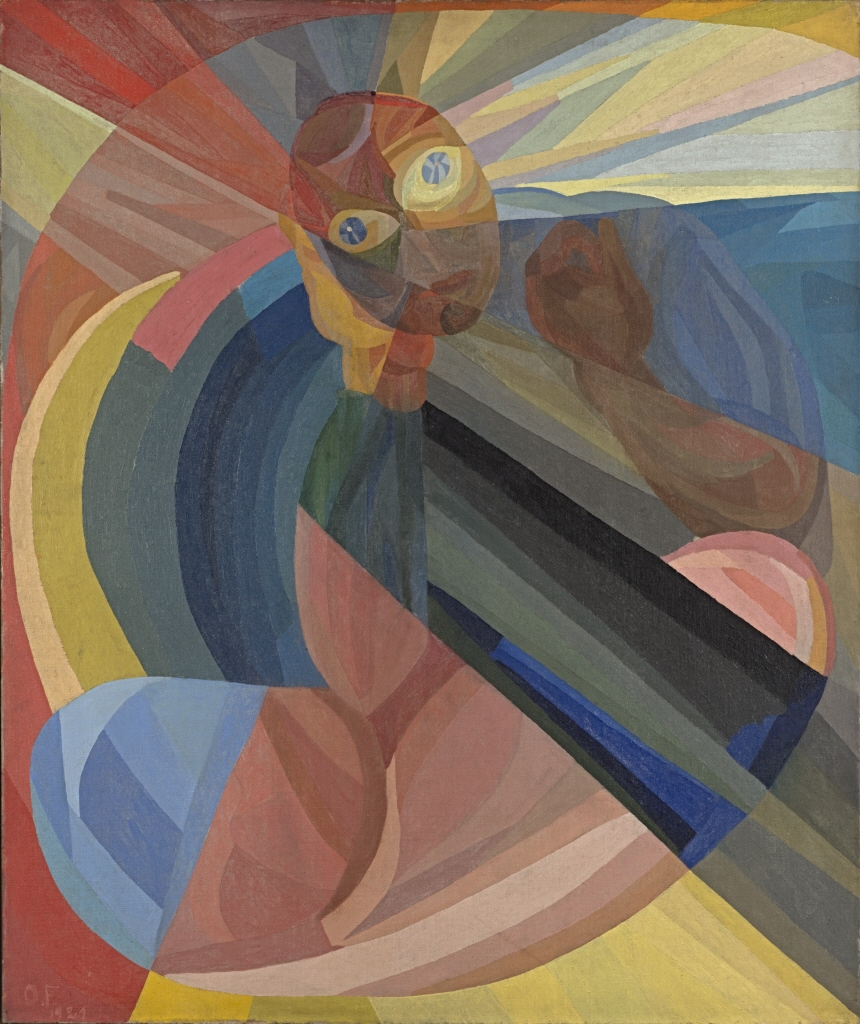
The Mother (1921)

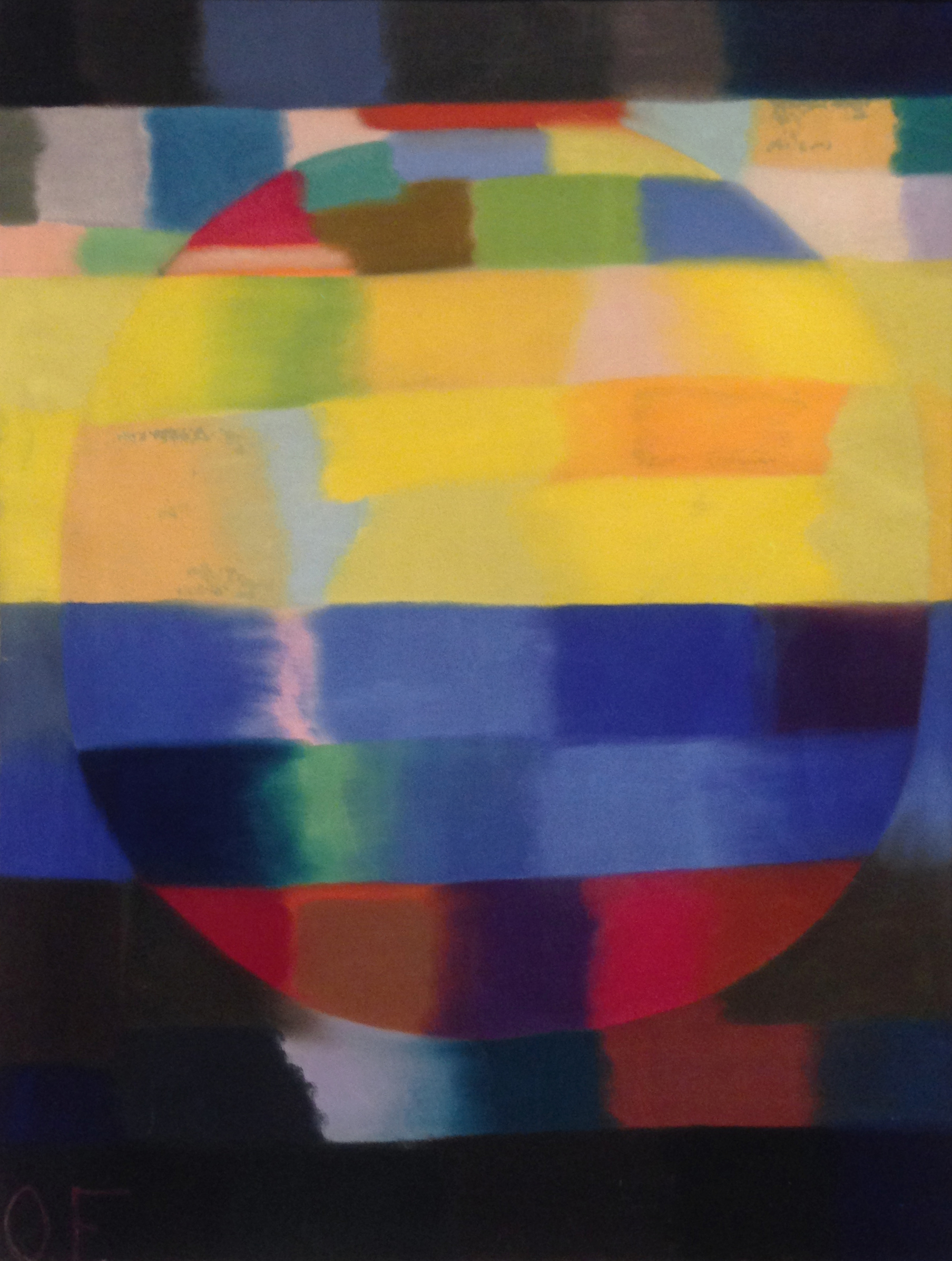
Spherical bodies (1925)

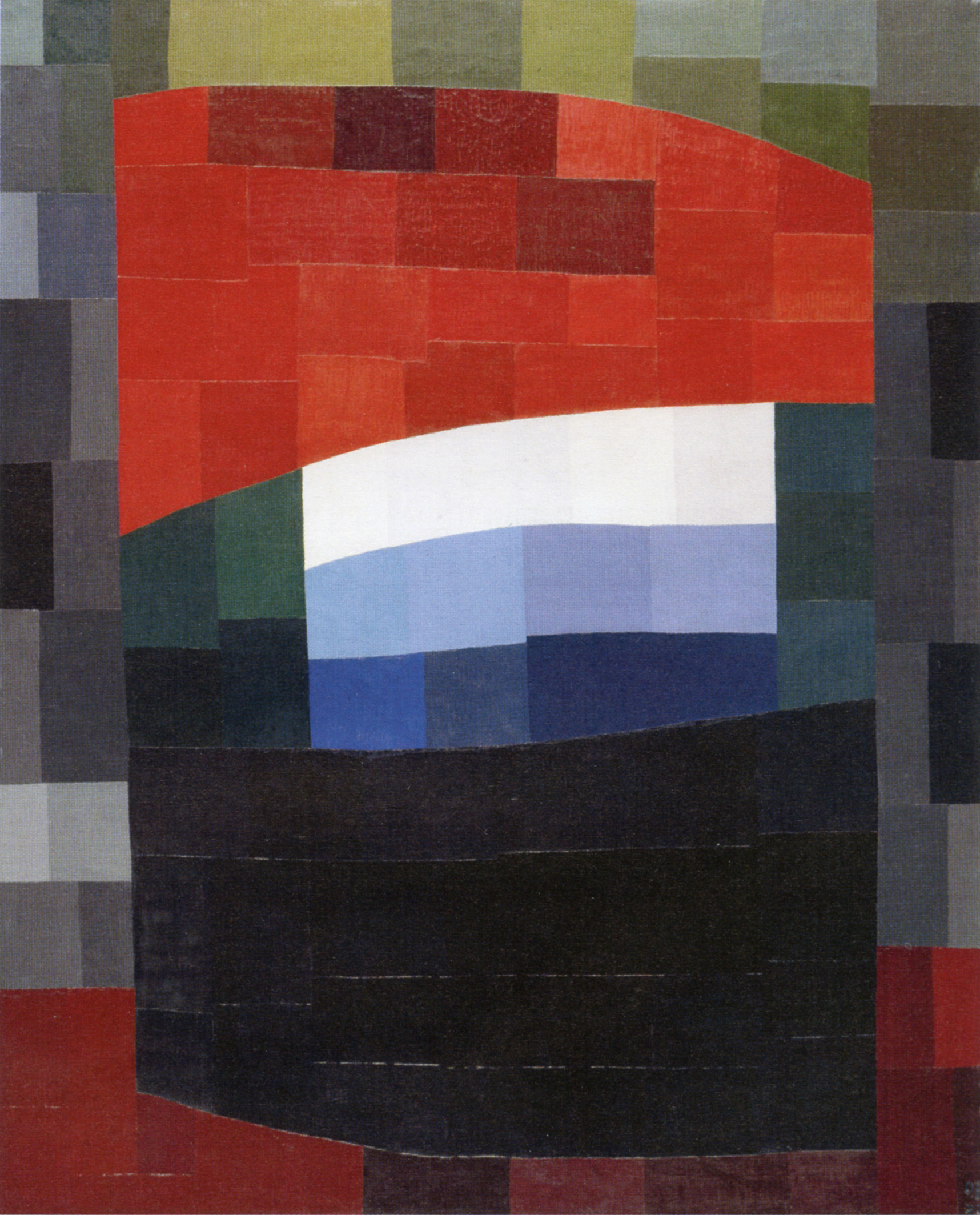
My red heaven (1932)

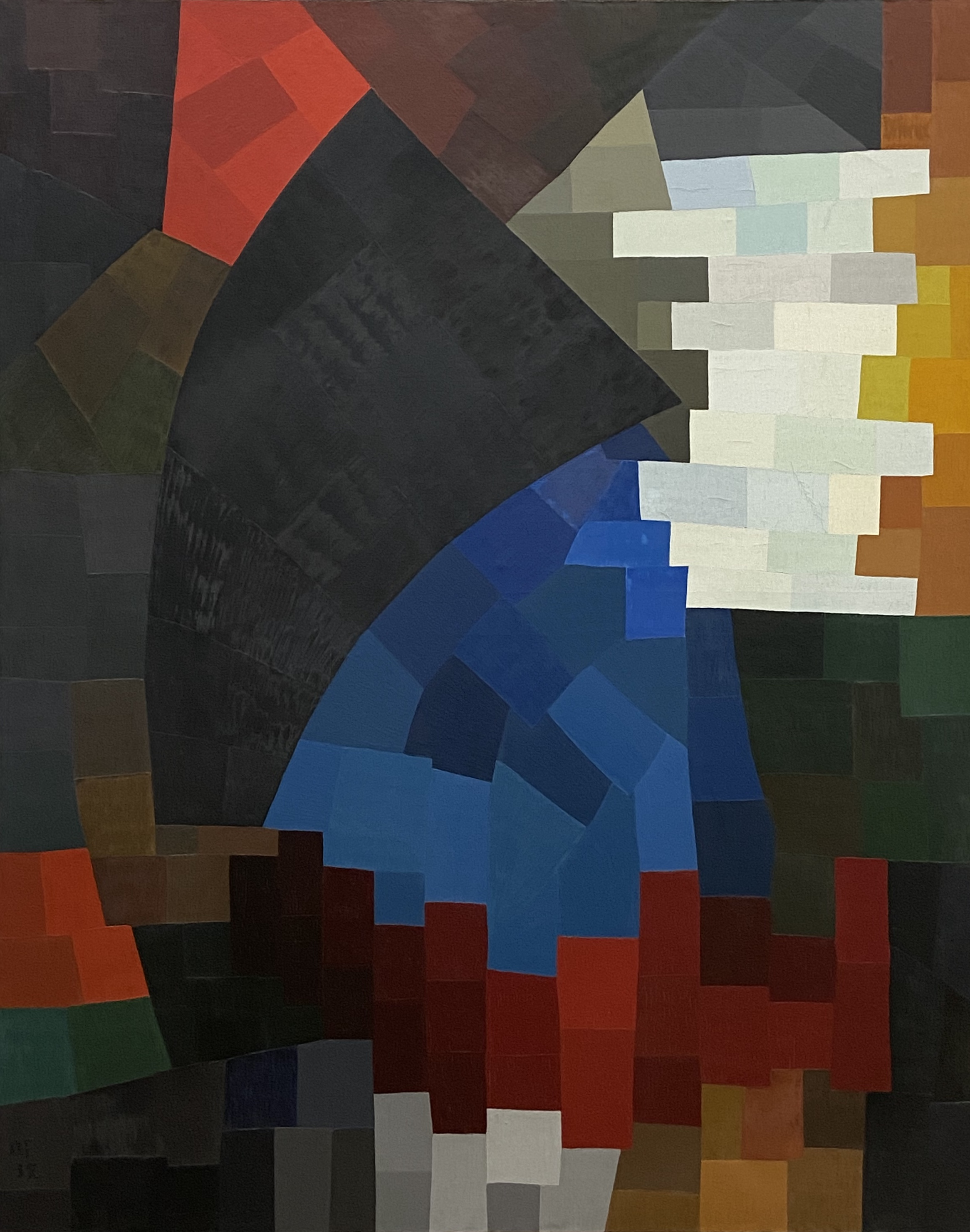
Composition (1932)

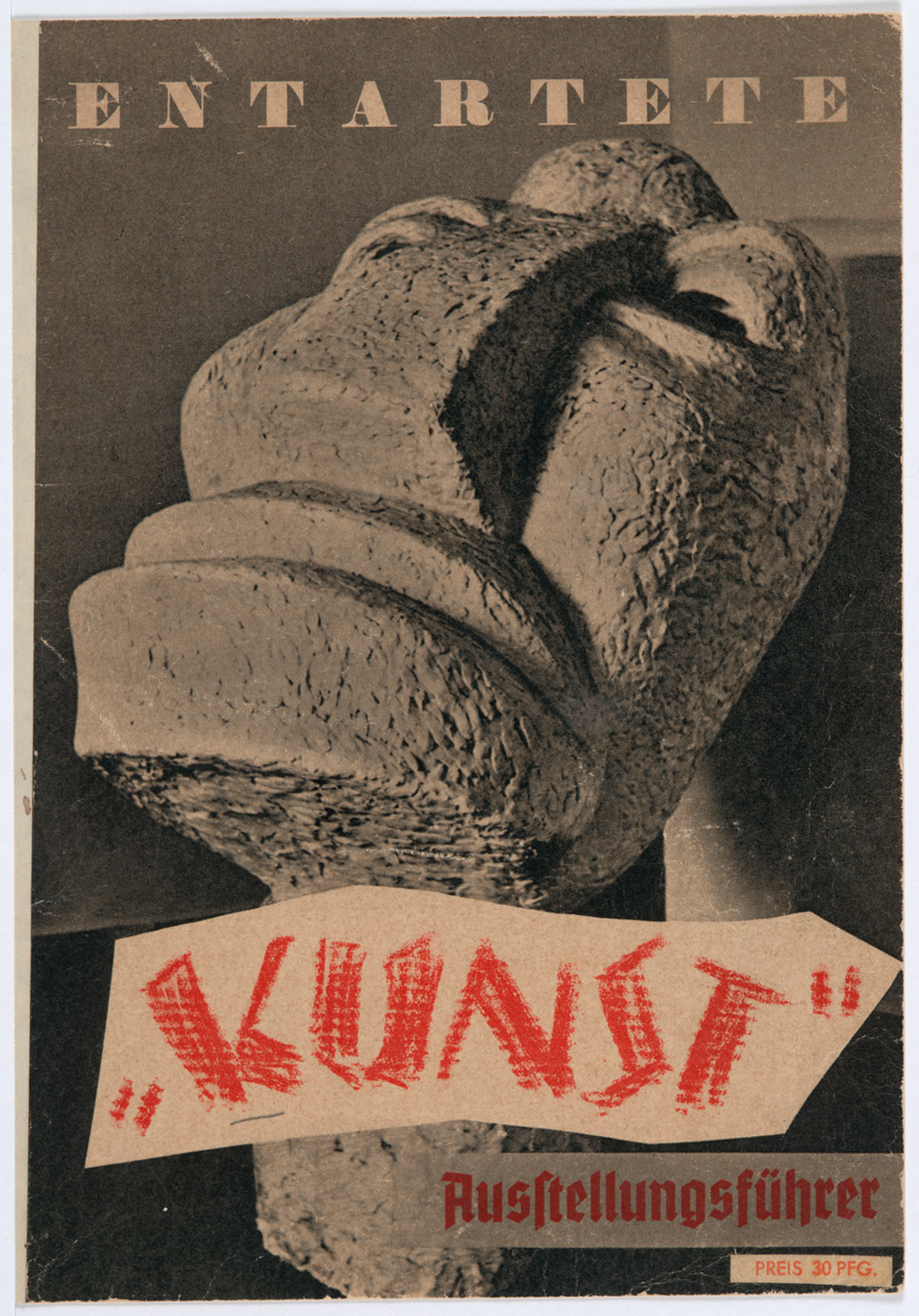
Catalogue cover for the Degenerate Art exhibition, with his sculpture Der Neue Mensch

Komposition (1933)

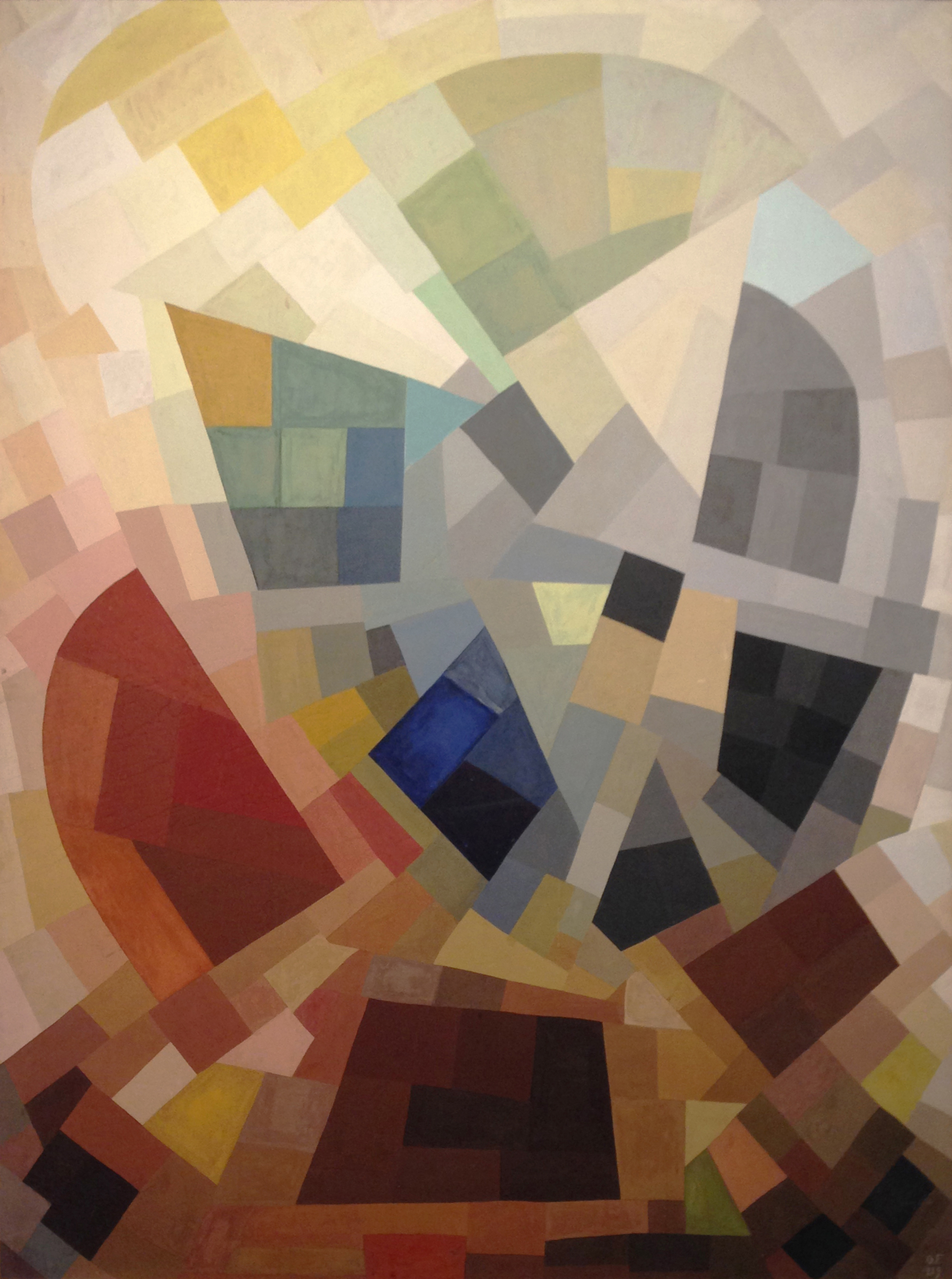
Komposition (1939)

== See also ==
- List of German painters
