= A Picasso =

Stage play by Jeffrey Hatcher

A Picasso is a two-character stage play by Jeffrey Hatcher. Originally commissioned by Philip Langner and the Theatre Guild. A Picasso received its world premier by The Philadelphia Theatre Company at Plays and Players Theater, in Philadelphia, opening on May 31, 2003.

In occupied Paris, 1941, Pablo Picasso has been summoned from his favorite cafe and taken to a storage vault for an interrogation by Miss Fischer, a "cultural attache" from Berlin. She has been ordered to authenticate three Picasso paintings recently "confiscated" by the Nazis from their Jewish owners. The Nazi Ministry of Propaganda has planned an "exhibition" to burn "degenerate art." Picasso engages Fischer in a desperate negotiation to save his work while the pair discuss art, politics, sex, and truth.

== Productions ==
The play, directed by John Tillinger, was given its world premiere by The Philadelphia Theatre Company, Philadelphia in May 2003 with Jeffrey DeMunn as Pablo Picasso and Lisa Banes as Miss Fischer. Tillinger also directed the 2004 Miami, Florida performances at the Coconut Grove Playhouse with Peter Michael Goetz as Pablo Picasso and Lucie Arnaz as Miss Fischer as well as the Manhattan Theatre Club performances in New York City with Dennis Boutsikaris as Pablo Picasso and Jill Eikenberry as Miss Fischer.

== Divadlo Ungelt ==
Directed by Jiří Svoboda. The play was presented by the Ungelt Theatre in Prague. The play was won a prize Thalia for both an actor Milan Kňažko (nominated) and Vilma Cibulková (won).

- Pablo Picasso .... Milan Kňažko
- Miss Fischer .... Vilma Cibulková
