= Eugen Hoffmann =

German sculptor and painter (1892–1955)

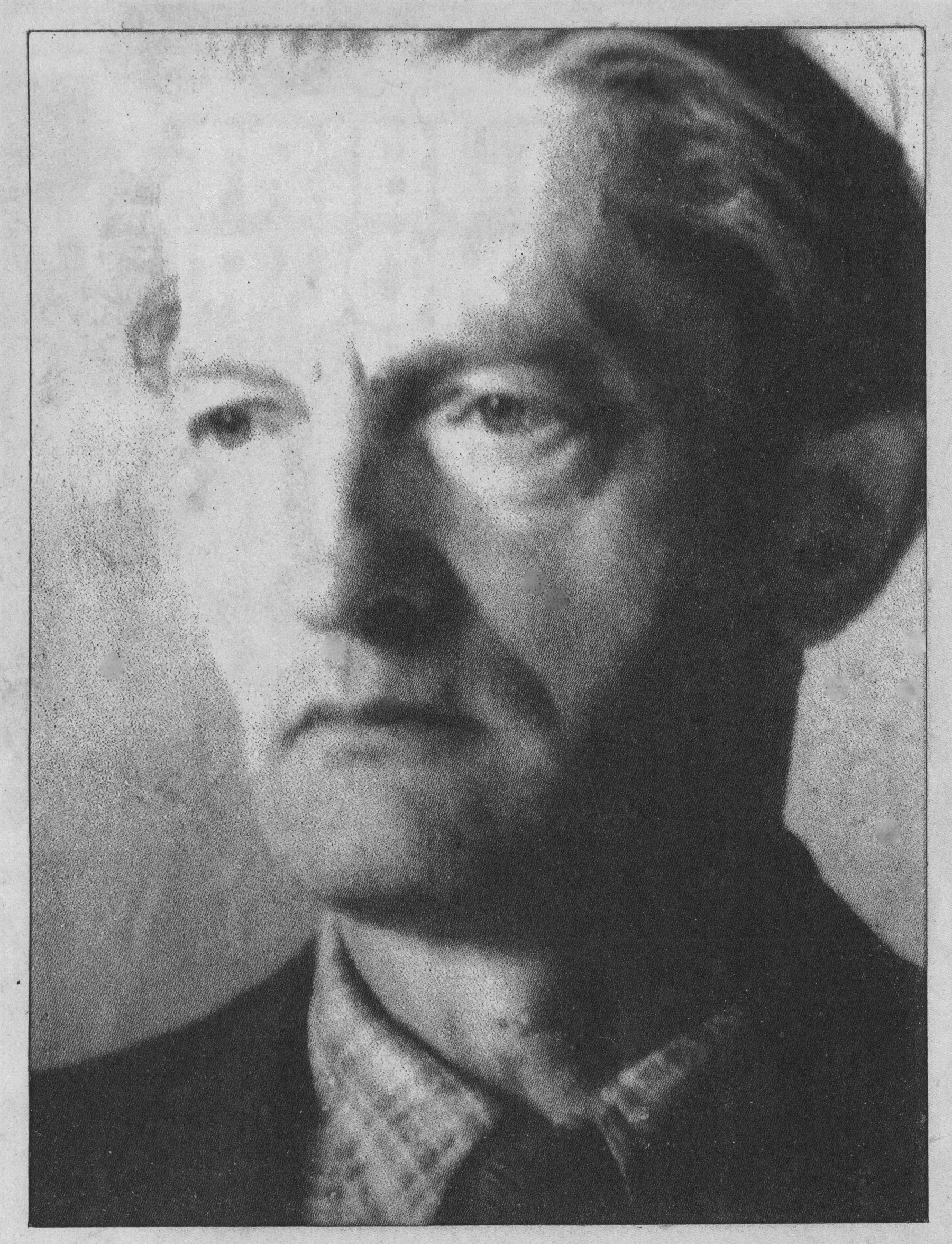
- Born: 1892; Dresden
- Died: 1955 (aged 62–63); Dresden
- Resting place: Heidefriedhof, Dresden
- Notable work: Girl with Blue Hair (Mädchen mit Blauem haar)

Eugen Hoffmann, born in Dresden on 1892, a sculptor, trained in 1919 with Karl Albiker at the Dresden Academy of Fine Arts.

He joined the Communist Party of Germany in 1933.

In 1937 his work was selected for the Degenerate Art Exhibition in 1937.

== Works in Entartete Kunst ==
Works in Entartete Kunst include:

Adam and Eve - Exhibited as Joseph and Potiphar by Christoph Voll. Destroyed.

Mädchen mit blauem Haar (Girl with blue hair) Plaster. Acquired by Stadtmuseum Dresden 1919. The replica of this work was used in the 2017 German film Never Look Away.

Weiblicher Akt (Female nude) Wood, dimensions unknown.

Nackln Web (Female nude) Etching.
