= Thalhimer Tennis Center =

Tennis facility in Richmond, Virginia

Coordinates: 37.54480°N 77.45344°W

- Interactive map of Thalhimer Tennis Center
- Full name: Thalhimer Tennis Center
- Location: Richmond, Virginia
- Owner: Virginia Commonwealth University
- Capacity: 200
- Surface: Hard court surface
- Field size: 45,441 sq ft (4,221.6 m^{2})

Construction
- Opened: 1993

Tenants
- VCU Rams men's tennis VCU Rams women's tennis

The Thalhimer Tennis Center is the intercollegiate tennis facility at Virginia Commonwealth University in Richmond, Virginia. It is home stadium and training facility for the VCU Rams women's tennis and the VCU Rams men's tennis teams.

== Facility ==
The facility is part of the VCU Athletic Village which contains the Cary Street Gym, the Cary Street Field and Sports Backers Stadium. Apart from Sports Backers, these three athletic facilities are all within a block of one another. The Thalhimer Center opened in 1993 with six tennis courts, and has bleachers to sit up to 200 people.
