= Paul Thalheimer =

German painter

Paul Thalheimer (German: [ˈpaʊl ˈtaːlhaɪmɐ]; born 25 May 1884 in Heilbronn - died 1948) was a German painter and graphic designer who was best known for his Christian motifs.

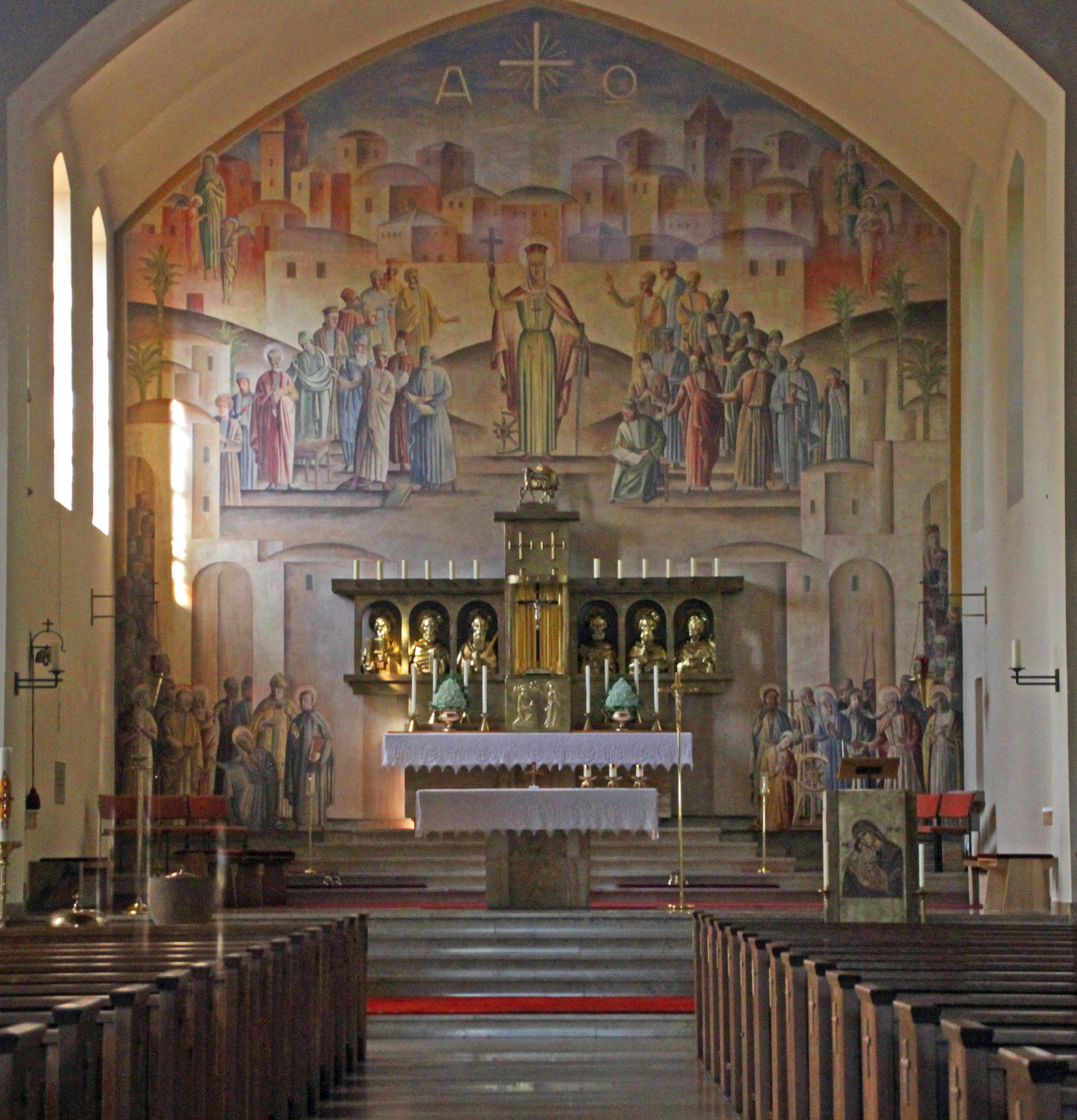
Leimen, St. Katharina

He studied art at the academies of Stuttgart and München, and settled down in München (1908) for most of his life. He was part of the Munich Secession and was a leading figure, in addition to taking part in exhibitions.

After serving in the First World War, Thalheimer contributed to many projects in church restoration, making coloured woodcuts based on Old Testament topics. He was named Professor in 1928 - and a degenerate artist in 1937. After being designated a degenerate artist, Thalheimer was forced to flee from Nazi Germany.

At the St. Karl's Church in Nürnberg, he used a thin paint containing casein to keep the structure of the stone in the walls, allowing his figures to be identifiable at the same time.
