= Werner Scholz (painter) =

German-Austrian painter (1898–1982)

Werner Scholz (born 23 October 1898, as Werner Ferdinand Ehrenfried Scholz in Berlin – 5 September 1982, Schwaz, Tyrol) was a German-Austrian painter.

Werner Scholz is a representative of the second generation of German Expressionism. As a contemporary of George Grosz and Otto Dix, he illustrated life in the city in Berlin. His pictures, painted with powerful gestures, show people in their existential loneliness and need. After having been ostracized as a "degenerate artist" by the Nazis, he moved to the Tyrolean mountain village of Alpbach in 1939, where he lived until his death.

== Early life ==
Werner Scholz, son of the architect Ehrenfried Scholz (a student of Walter Gropius) and the pianist Elisabeth, née Gollner, began studying painting at the Berlin University of the Arts in 1916. Scholz volunteered for military service in World War I. On his 19th birthday (23 October 1917) he was badly injured in Chemin des Dames in France, and subsequently lost his left forearm. In the years 1919–1920 he continued his studies in painting at the Berlin University of the Arts. In 1920 Scholz left the art school and moved into a studio on Nollendorfplatz in Berlin.

== Berlin ==
In the 1920s and 1930s, Scholz used Expressionist stylistic devices to describe the hardship and misery of the petty bourgeoisie in post-war Berlin with a powerful gesture. Alongside George Grosz, Otto Dix and Max Beckmann, Werner Scholz was a member of the second generation of German Expressionism. The oil paintings from 1919 to 1945 initially have a muted tonality, but are extremely expressive. Like Franz Frank, Albert Birkle and Otto Pankok, Werner Scholz is a representative of Expressive Realism, who doesn't embellish anything and, as in the 1933 oil painting "The Expelled", foresaw the ominous future.

For Scholz, it was not just the construction of the picture that was important, but the expressiveness of the line and the expressiveness of the color. That is why meeting Emil Nolde, who bought a picture of him at an early age, was particularly important to him. The constructive energy with which the German successor generation of the "Fauves", Franz Marc, August Macke, Karl Schmidt-Rottluff, Ernst Ludwig Kirchner, Erich Heckel and Emil Nolde, tamed the wild colors undoubtedly had an impact on Werner Scholz's generation. But Scholz goes like his contemporaries George Grosz and Otto Dixin its expressiveness far beyond the generation of its predecessors. Scholz's work gains its constructive power from the concentration on the relentlessness of a gesture in which human destiny is concentrated.
