= Die Silbergäule =

Expressionist–Dadaist German book series

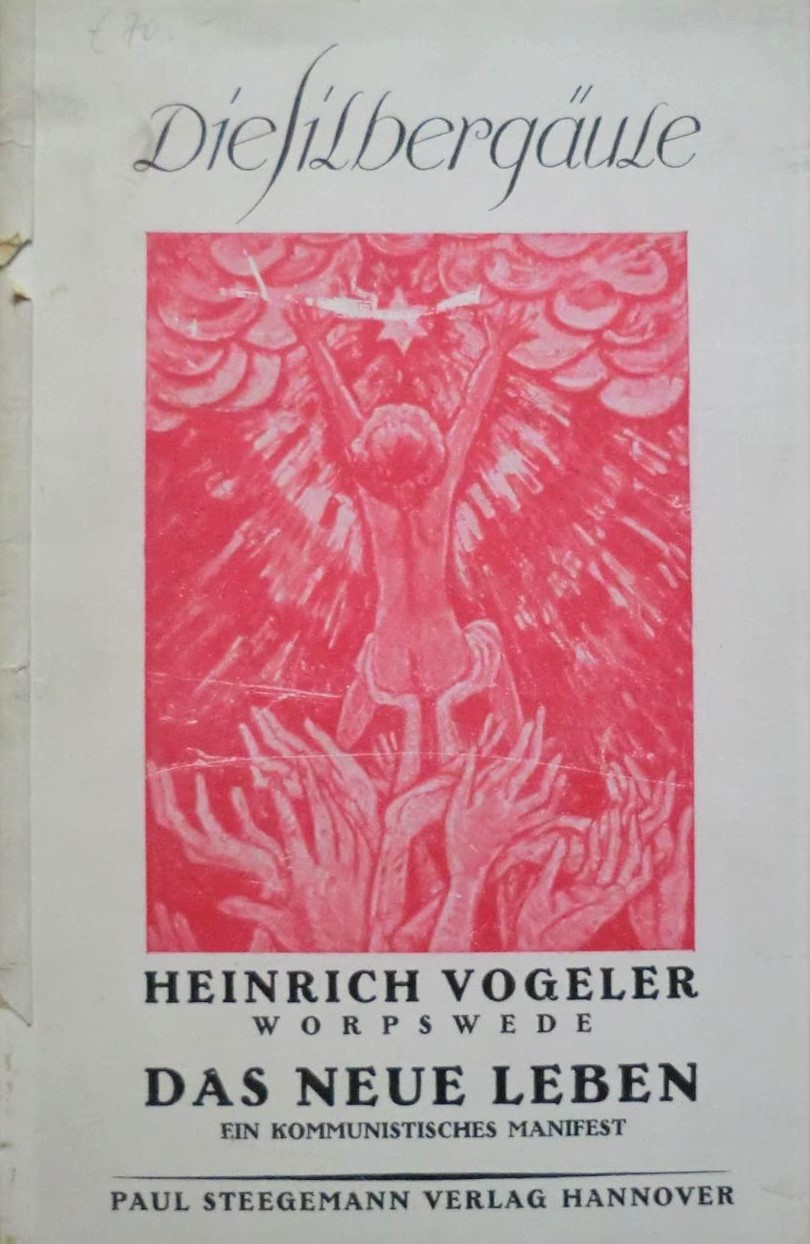
Heinrich Vogeler: Das Neue Leben. Ein kommunistisches Manifest (Die Silbergäule, vol. 19, 1919)

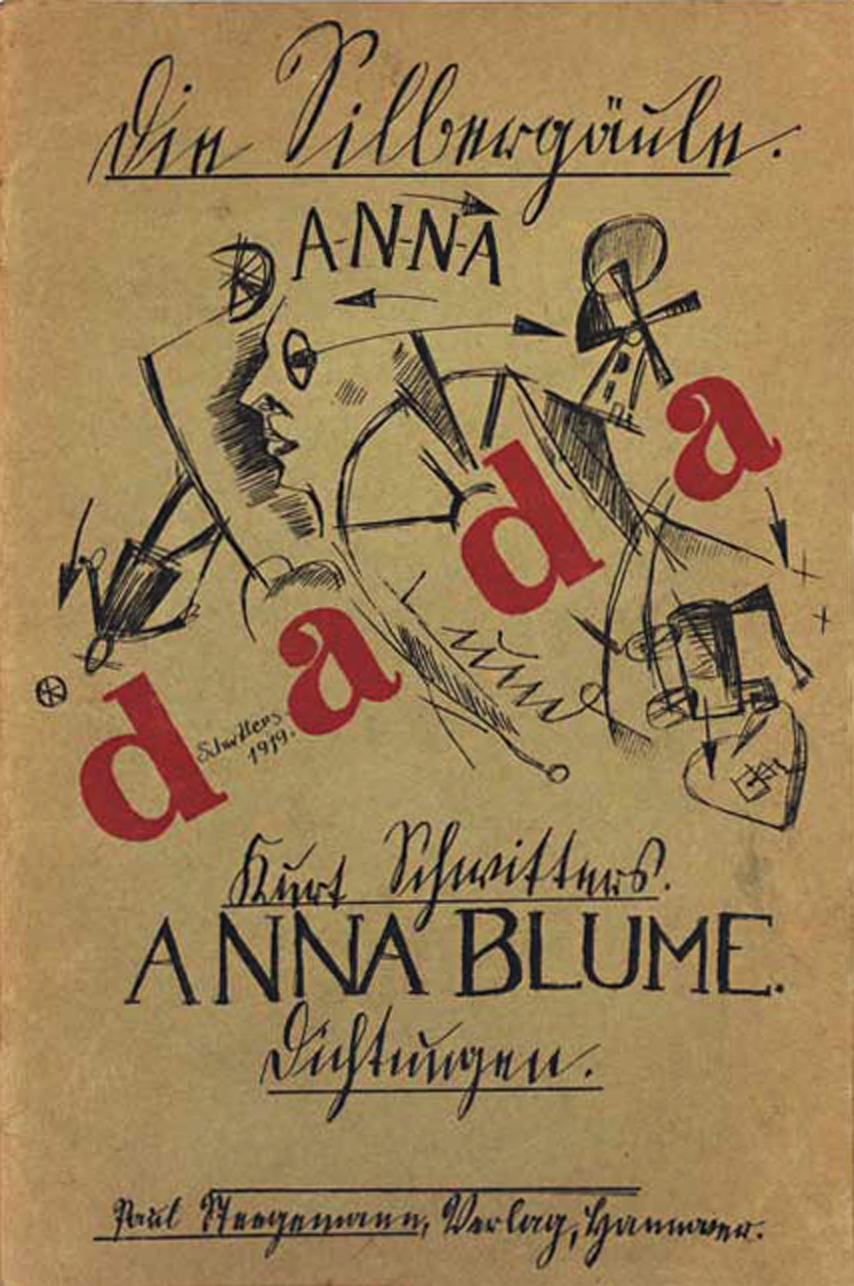
Kurt Schwitters: Anna Blume (Die Silbergäule, vol. 39/40, 1919)

Die Silbergäule (sometimes with the (German) subtitle: “a radical book series”) is a late Expressionist–Dadaist German book series published in Hanover by the Paul Steegemann Verlag from 1919 until 1922 (or 1923).

The word “Silbergaul” originates from the poem “Des Galgenbruders Gebet und Erhörung (Ein Nachtlied, im Jenseits vorzusingen)”, one of the Galgenlieder (transl. Gallows Songs), nonsensical poems by the German poet Christian Morgenstern, gathered in the famous collection.

== History ==
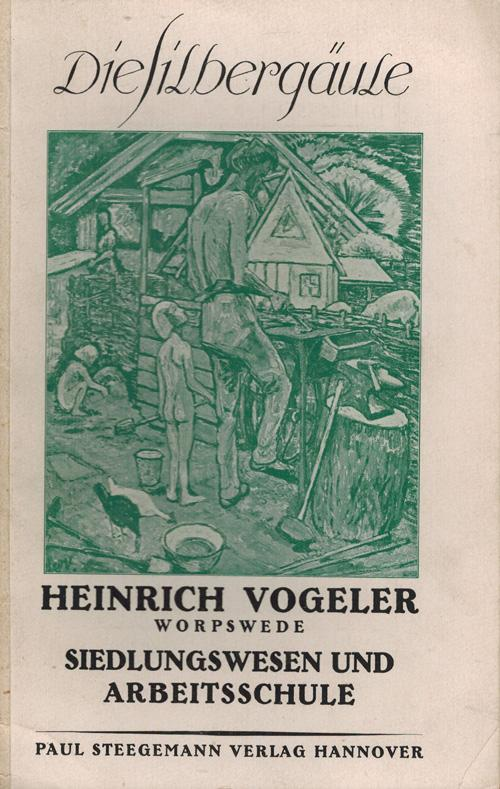
Heinrich Vogeler: Siedlungswesen und Arbeitsschule (Die Silbergäule, vol. 36, 1919)

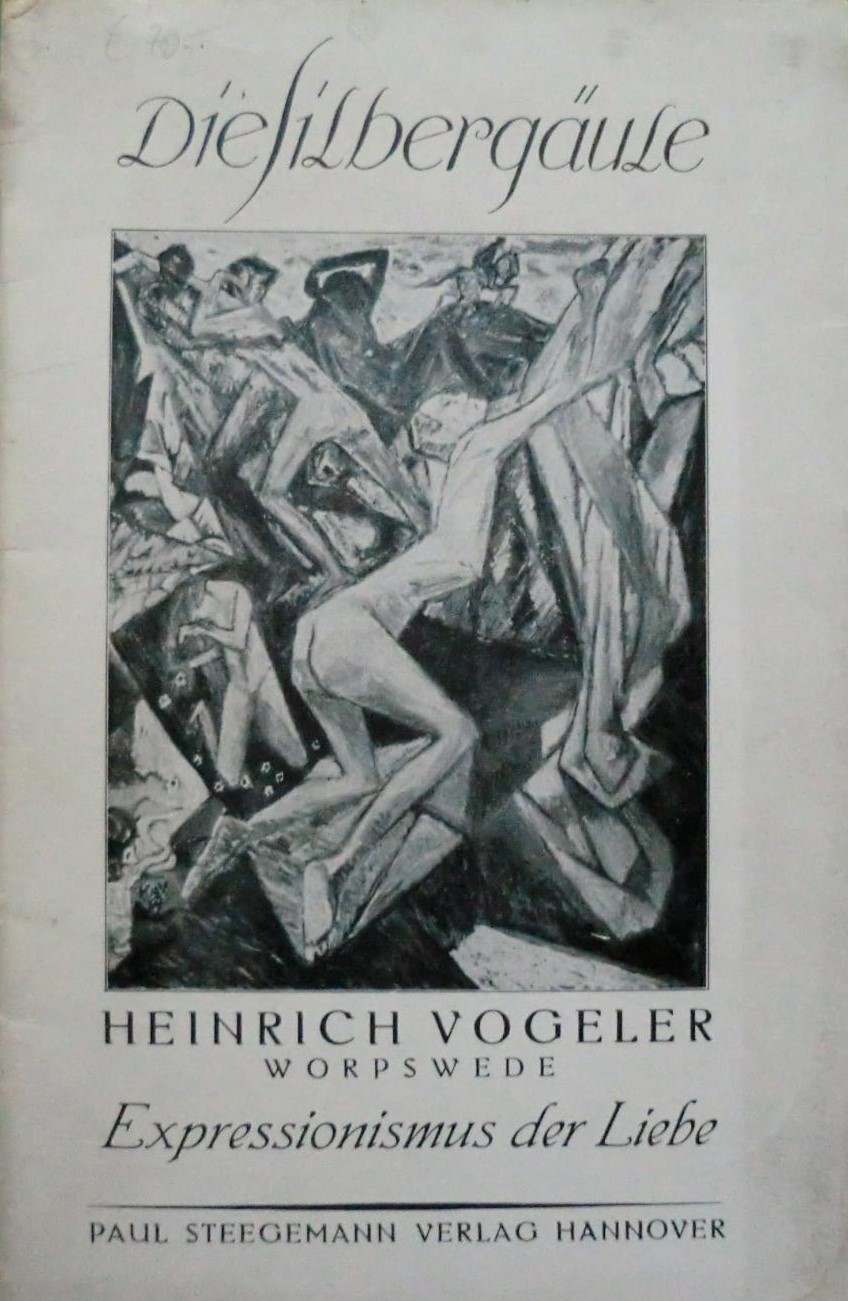
Heinrich Vogeler: Über den Expressionismus der Liebe (Die Silbergäule, vol. 12, 1919)

The Steegemann publishing house was founded in Hanover in 1919 by Paul Steegemann (1894–1956). The series Die Silbergäule was launched with publications by Expressionist authors (Rudolf Leonhard, Kasimir Edschmid, and Otto Flake). Among the authors of the first issues were also important inspirations and forerunners of Expressionism, such as Heinrich Mann and Carl Hauptmann. The series, however, gained its literary-historical significance through the publication of Dadaist texts: Kurt Schwitters’s Anna Blume and Die Kathedrale, Walter Serner’s Letzte Lockerung, Richard Huelsenbeck’s En avant dada, Hans Arp’s Wolkenpumpe, and Melchior Vischer’s Sekunde durch Hirn. Alongside the Malik-Verlag in Berlin, the Steegemann Verlag developed into the most important publisher of literary Dada productions.

One of the prominent contributors (also as illustrator) was also Heinrich Vogeler, who was represented with several volumes, for example volume 19, Das Neue Leben. Ein kommunistisches Manifest (The New Life. A Communist Manifesto), with an Expressionist cover illustration by Heinrich Vogeler, volume 12 Über den Expressionismus der Liebe (On the Expressionism of Love), and volume 36, Siedlungswesen und Arbeitsschule (Settlement Organization and Work School), a programmatic draft of a socialist commune with an associated work school, which Vogeler began to realize from 1919 onward at the Barkenhoff in Worpswede.

== Overview ==
According to the catalogue of the German National Library, the publication of the series is documented up to volume 153 and the year 1922 (here in selection):

- 1/2 Briefe an Margit: Gedichte. Leonhard, Rudolf. 1919
- 3 Der Sohn: Novelle. Mann, Heinrich. 1919
- 4 Gustav Wyneken's Erziehungslehre und der Aktivismus. Hiller, Kurt. 1919
- 5/7 Echnaton: Novelle. Habicht, Victor Curt. 1919
- 8/9 Der Emigrant: Novelle. Martens, Kurt. 1919
- 10/11 Stehe von Lichtern gestreichelt: Gedichte. Edschmid, Kasimir. 1919
- 12 Über den Expressionismus der Liebe. Vogeler, Heinrich. 1919
- 13/14 Stimmen: Gedichte. Lask, Berta. 1919
- 15 Mittelalter: 8 Steinzeichnungen. Dörries, Bernhard. [1919]
- 16 Die tausend Gelächter: Gedichte. Schnack, Anton. 1919
- 17 Wandlung: Novelle. Flake, Otto. 1919
- 18 Die Hölle: Novelle. Moreck, Curt. 1919
- 19 Das neue Leben : Ein kommunistisches Manifest. Vogeler, Heinrich. 1919
- 20 Lesseps. Hauptmann, Carl. 1919
- 21/22 Des Kaisers Liebkosende: Legende. Hauptmann, Carl. 1919
- 23/24 Der schwingende Felsen von Tandil: Legende. Hauptmann, Carl. 1919
- 25/26 Das Wesen des Kommunismus. Bäumer, Ludwig. 1919
- 27/28 Das Meer: Erzählung. Krell, Max. 1919
- 29/30 Der Triumph des Todes: ein Mysterienspiel in 3 Aufzügen. Habicht, Victor Curt. 1919
- 31/32 Himmlisches Manifest: Ein Gesicht. Weinrich, Franz Johannes. 1919
- 33/33a Essays über Gustav Landauer, Romain Rolland, Friedrich Hölderlin, die Metaphysik des Bürgers. Michel, Wilhelm. 1920
- 34/35 Der bekränzte Silen : Verse von einem tröstlichen Ufer. Weber, Carl Maria. 1919
- 36 Siedlungswesen und Arbeitsschule. Vogeler, Heinrich. 1919
- 39/40 Anna Blume. Schwitters, Kurt. 1919
- 41/42 Die Kathedrale: Merz[-Antidada] ; 8 Lithos. Schwitters, Kurt. 1920
- 43/44 Die Dämonen: 8 Steinzeichn. zu F. M. Dostojewskis Roman. Burchartz, Max. [1919]
- 45/47 Unterm Leichentuch: ein Nachtstück. Mynona. 1920
- 48/49 Jungfraun platzen männertoll: Grotesken. Wagner, Friedrich Wilhelm. 1920
- 50/51 En avant Dada: Die Geschichte des Dadaismus. Huelsenbeck, Richard. 1920
- 52/53 Die Wolkenpumpe. Arp, Hans. 1920
- 54 Proletkult: Kunst und Kultur in der Kommunistischen Gesellschaft. Vogeler, Heinrich. 1920
- 55/56 Hermaphrodit: symphonische Dichtung. Sidow, Max. 1920
- 57/58 Die grosse Hure. Brendel, Robert. 1920
- 59/61 Sekunde durch Hirn : ein unheimlich schnell rotierender Roman. Vischer, Melchior. 1920
- 62/64 Letzte Lockerung : Manifest Dada. Serner, Walter. 1920
- 65/66 Traumschutt: Gedichte. Klemm, Wilhelm. 1920
- 67/68 Spuk: Steinzeichn. Wanders, Heinz. [1920]
- 69/75 Die letzte Lust: Ein Roman. Habicht, Victor Curt. 1920

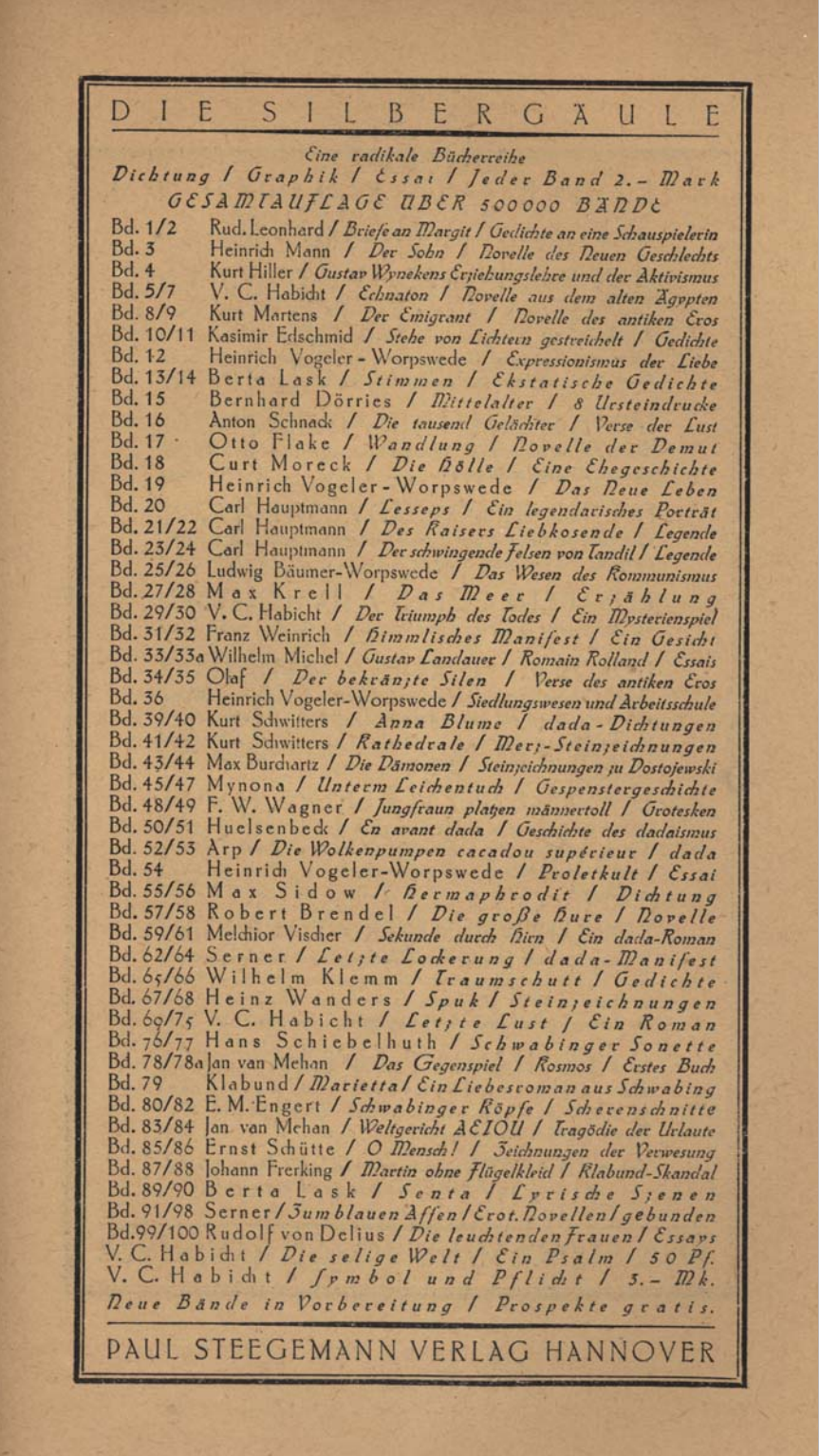
Die Silbergäule (nos. 1–100) - announcement

- (announced) 76/77 Schwabinger Sonette. Hans Schiebelhuth
- (announced) 78/78a Das Gegenspiel / Kosmos / Erstes Buch. Jan van Mehan
- 79 Marietta: [e. Liebesroman aus Schwabing]. Klabund. 1920
- 80/82 Schwabinger Köpfe: Scherenschnitte. Engert, Ernst Moritz. 1921
- 83/84 Weltgericht : Die Tragödie d. Urlaute AEIOU. Havemann, Hans. 1921
- 87/88 Martin ohne Flügelkleid. Frerking, Johann. 1920
- 89/90 Senta: Eine Lebenslinie in 8 Scenen. Lask, Berta. 1921
- 99/100 Die leuchtenden Frauen. Delius, Rudolf von. 1921
- 101/106 Der Büchernarr. Flaubert, Gustave. Mit Lithogr. v. Alfred Kubin. 1920
- 109/110 Das Buch der irdischen Mühe und des himmlischen Lohnes. Siang, Wang. 1921
- 111/112 Odysseus und die Syrenen. Habicht, Victor Curt. Hannover : Der Zweemann-Verl., 1920
- 113/118 Der Funke Gott: Gedichte. Habicht, Victor Curt. Hannover : Der Zweemann-Verl., 1919
- 119/125 Die späten Hymnen. Hölderlin, Friedrich. 1921
- 126/127 Dass ich Sebastian sei. Seidel, Alexander. 1921
- 128/131 Freundschaft: Gedichte 1914–1919. Schilling, Heinar. 1921
- 132/134 Die Dinte wider das Blut: ein Zeitroman. Sünder, Artur. 1921
- 135/136 Unsittliche Literatur und deutsche Republik. Blei, Franz. 1921
- 137/138 Wendepunkte : 4 groteske Striche. Timpe, Ferdinand. 1921
- 139/146 Vampir: Ein garantiert verwahrloser Schundroman in Lumpen, Fetzchen, Mätzchen und Unterhosen. Ewers, Hanns Heinz. 1921
- 147/151 Der weiße Knabe: Die Geschichte e. seltsamen Liebe / Münzer, Kurt. 1922
- 152 Das goldene Dresden. Kalenter, Ossip. 1922
- 153 Die Idyllen um Sylphe. Kalenter, Ossip. 1922

A few volumes had been published by the Zweemann Verlag in Hanover.

== See also ==
- Paul Steegemann (German)
- Der Zweemann (German)

== Bibliography ==
- Jochen Meyer: Der Paul Steegemann Verlag (1919-1935 und 1949-1960). Geschichte, Programm, Bibliographie. Bibliographien des Antiquariats Fritz Eggert, Band 5. Fritz Eggert, Stuttgart 1975
