= Bernhard Dörries =

German painter (1898–1978)

Bernhard Dörries ( May 26, 1898 – July 15, 1978) was a German painter and art writer.

He was born in Hanover. His father was the Protestant theologian Bernhard Dörries (1856–1934) and his older brother was the church historian Hermann Dörries (1895–1977).

In 1917 Dörries studied architecture at the Technical University of Hanover. After he met Kurt Schwitters he began painting and studied at the Art Academy in Berlin. During study visits he traveled to Italy, Spain and France. In 1919 he became a member of the Hanover Secession. From 1924 he became a member of the Kunstverein Hannover executive board. In 1933 Dörries joined the National Socialist German Workers’ Party (NSDAP). At the Paris World Exhibition of 1937 he won a Grand Prix for a portrait of a girl. After the death of Georg Schrimpf in 1938, Dörries was appointed to replace him as a professor at the Art Academy in Berlin, a position he held until the end of World War II. From 1937 to 1944, Dörries exhibited paintings in seven German art exhibitions in Munich.

After the war, Dörries lived in Langenholtensen near Northeim until 1949 and then in Hanover. From 1955 until 1967 he was again a professor at the Berlin University of the Arts. From 1973 he was a member of the German Federation of Artists.

Dörries died on July 15, 1978, in Bielefeld.
