= Merz (art style) =

Term used by Kurt Schwitters

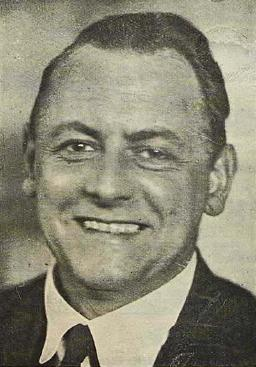
MERZ artist Kurt Schwitters

Merz (art style) is a synonym for the more common expression and term Dada, and traces back to Kurt Schwitters.

== Origin ==
Merz was conceptualized by Kurt Schwitters, who planned a Dada section in Hanover. However, upon being denied an invitation to the First International Dada Fair in Berlin in 1920, Schwitters wished to establish a subsect of the Dada movement that was tailored to his own artistic philosophies and visions. In his own words, he wished to find a "totally unique hat fitting only a single head"— his own.

== Etymology ==
The name Merz was generated by chance through a collage that incorporated the German word Kommerz (commerce). The resulting word, which was nonsensical and spontaneously generated, was similar in origin and philosophy to the title of Dada. Merz became Schwitters's synonym for his own approach to Dada.

== Characteristics ==
Like Dada, Merz was characterized by spontaneity and frequently made use of found objects. One of the most significant Merz artifacts constructed by Schwitters is the Merzbau, a tower-sized sculpture assembled from refuse and ephemera that occupied the inside of his apartment and existed from 1927 to 1943, when it was destroyed by a British air raid during World War II.

== Reception ==
Kurt Schwitters, a pioneer in fusing collage and abstraction— influenced Robert Rauschenberg, Jasper Johns, the Fluxus movement and Joseph Beuys, too.

== See also ==
- Kurt Schwitters
- Dada
- Fluxus
- Joseph Beuys
- Robert Rauschenberg
- Jasper Johns
- Louise Nevelson
