= An Anna Blume =

1919 poem by Kurt Schwitters

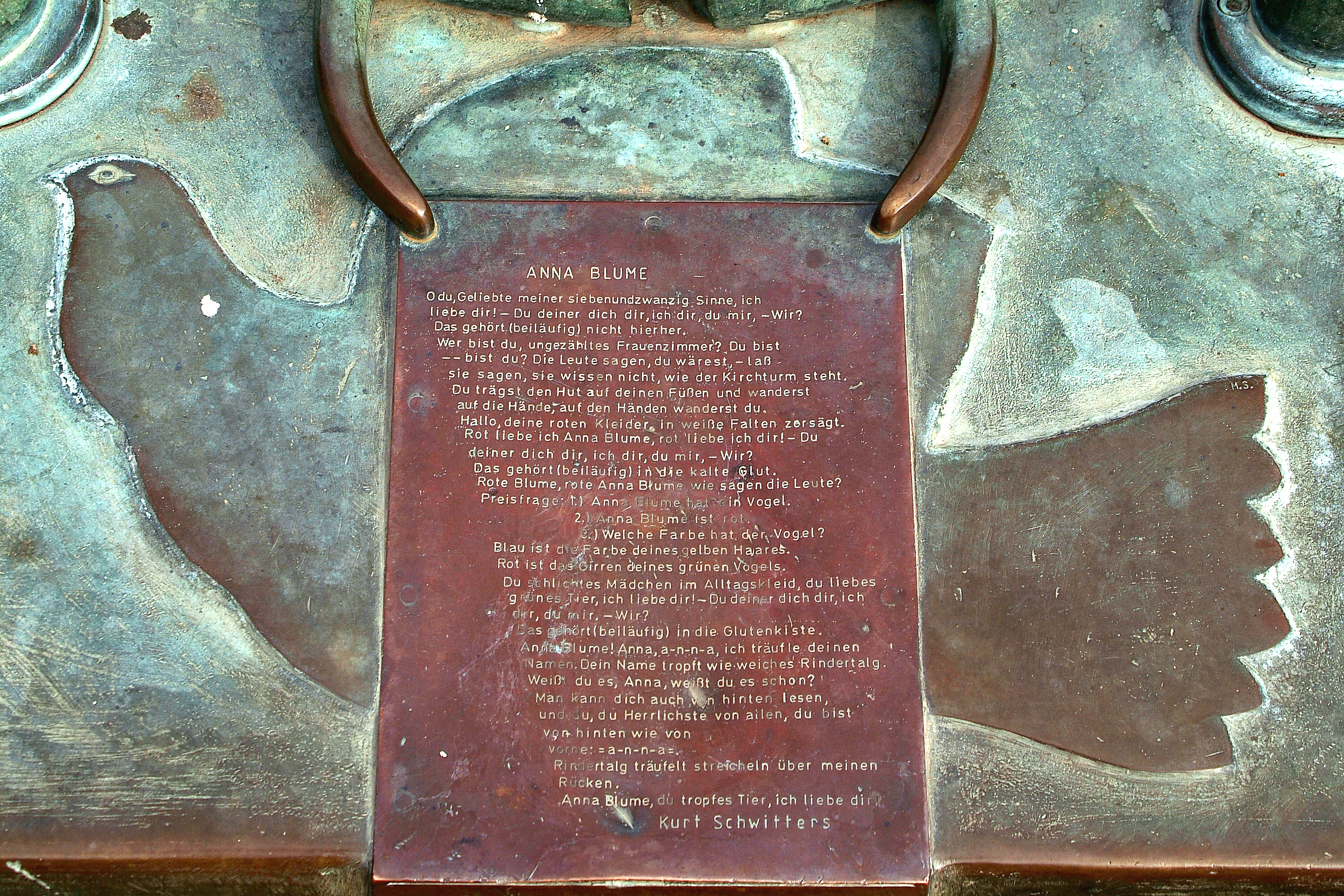
The poem on the "Anna-Blume-Brunnen" by Max Sauk at the Mühlenberger Markt, Mühlenberg (Hannover).

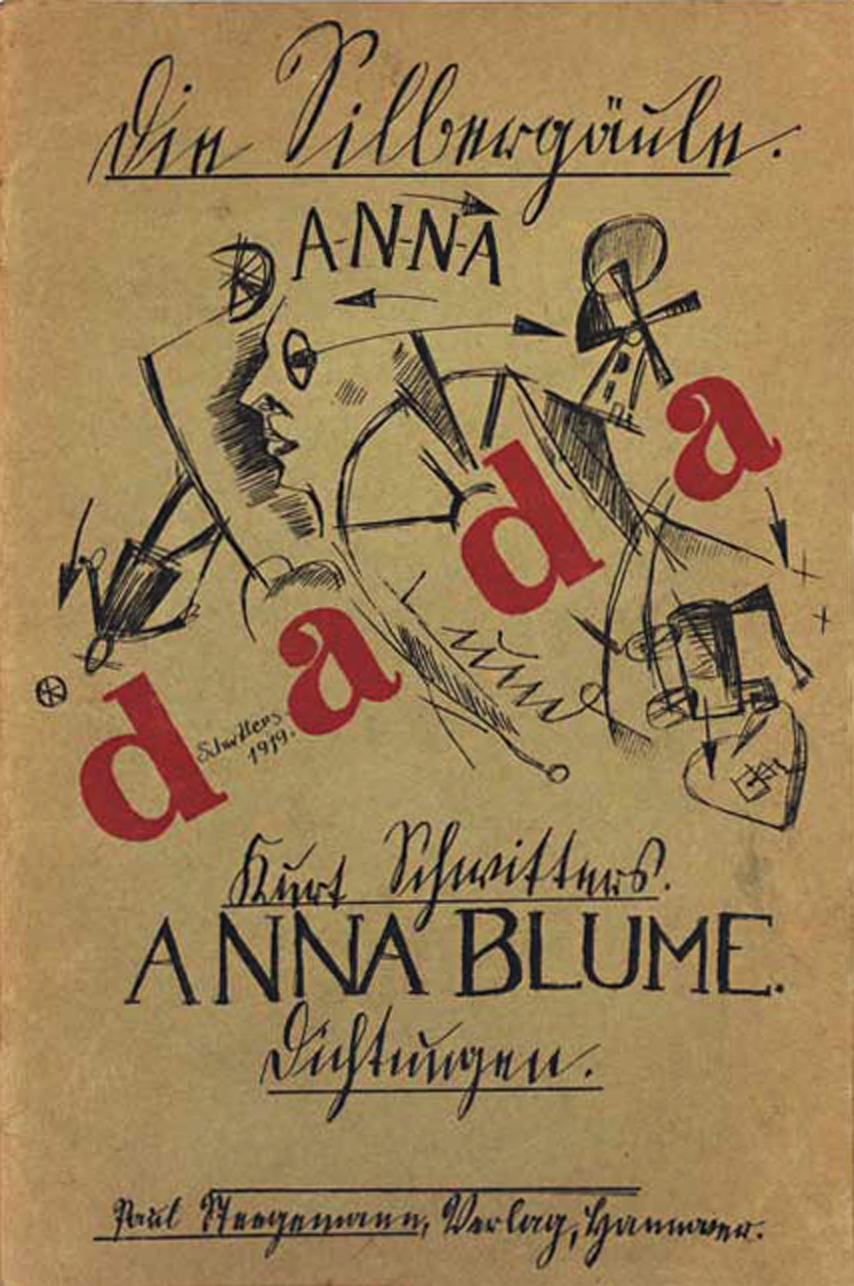
Cover of Anna Blume, Dichtungen 1919

"An Anna Blume" ("To Anna Flower" also translated as "To Eve Blossom") is a poem written by the German artist Kurt Schwitters in 1919. It has been described as a parody of a love poem, an emblem of the chaos and madness of the era, and as a harbinger of a new poetic language.

== The poem ==
Originally published in Herwarth Walden's Der Sturm magazine in August 1919, the poem made Schwitters famous almost overnight. The poem was parodied in newspapers and magazines, and strongly polarized public opinion.

Whilst Schwitters was never an official member of Berlin Dada, he was closely linked to many members of the group, in particular Raoul Hausmann and Hans Arp, and the poem is written in a dadaist style, using multiple perspectives, fragments of found text, and absurdist elements to mirror the fragmentation of the narrator's emotional state in the throes of love, or of Germany's political, military and economic collapse after the First World War.

"Elements of poetry are letters, syllables, words, sentences. Poetry arises from the interaction of those elements. Meaning is important only if it employed as one such factor. I play off sense against nonsense. I prefer nonsense, but that is a purely personal matter." Kurt Schwitters, 1920

The poem was the subject of a particularly well-orchestrated publicity campaign. Initially fly-posted in Hannover, then subject to a spoiler in Herwarth Walden's der Sturm magazine asking 'Who really is Anna Blume?' answered with 'Twited brain! He painted the image of the time and didn't know it. Now he kneels before the daisies and prays.' Christof Spengemann The publication of the poem in September, two months after Schwitters' first one-man exhibition at Walden's Gallery in Berlin, cemented his reputation as a leading experimental collagist and poet. The poem became sufficiently famous to gain an English translation in 1922. It also provoked Berlin Dada into responding by exhibiting the effigy The Death Of Anna Blume, by Rudolf Schlichter at the First International Dada Fair, Berlin 1920. Richard Huelsenbeck in particular found the poem offensively sentimental and romantic;

"Dada rejects emphatically and as a matter of principle works like the famous 'Anna Blume' of Kurt Schwitters."

== Publication of the artist's book ==
Later in the year Schwitters would publish the poem in an artist's book called Anna Blume, Dichtungen. The original book contains several poems and short stories, including Die Zwiebel (The Onion), a fairy story about the dismemberment of the narrator Alves Bäsenstiel, who, when reassembled, becomes the new King. The book also includes the poems Grünes Kind (Green Child) and Nächte (Nights).

The first edition was published by Verlag Paul Steegemann, Hannover, 1919. The second edition, published in 1920, was exactly the same but for 8 extra pages of adverts. The third edition, published in 1922, was substantially different, however. Noticeably smaller, but with more pages (88 compared to the original's 40) and a plain white sleeve with a pink border, the revised version only included nine of the original twenty pieces. The other twenty-seven pieces include English, French and Russian translations of Anna Blume, Le Grande Ardeur de Dada (Marche Funèbre), a brief critique of dada written in French ('Let me explain - dada is the great root of all the little roots...'), and a series of newer poems that would point the way toward Schwitter's later poetic style, using a dramatically reduced vocabulary with heavy repetition. Zwölf (Twelve), for instance, only uses the first eleven numerals to create an eleven-line poem. ('One Two Three Four Five / Five Four Three Two One / Two Three Four Five Six / Six Five Four Three Two / Seven Seven Seven Seven Seven......)

The same year, Schwitters also published Memoiren Anna Blumes in Bleie, a book that chronicled and parodied reactions to the original book.

== Die Kathedrale ==
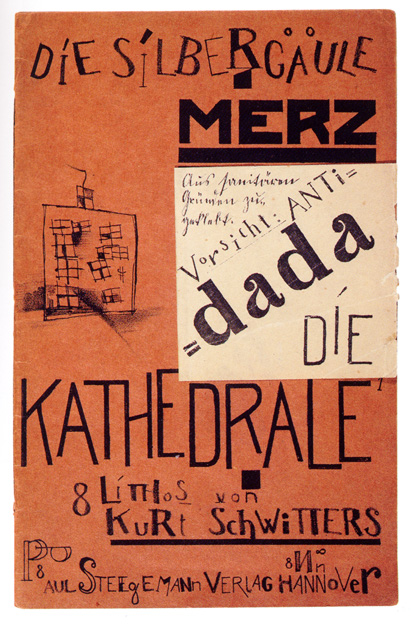
Cover of Die Kathedrale, 1920

In 1920 Schwitters published a second book in the same format, called Die Kathedrale (The cathedral). Again published by Paul Steegemann, Hannover, the work contained 8 lithographs, and was published in an edition of c. 3000. The lithographs are in the style of Schwitters' drawings of the period, using found elements, collage and stamps, along with scratchy pen and ink drawings.

The book uses the cathedral as a metaphor, a theme common amongst Expressionists such as Lyonel Feininger, and was to become a central feature of the organisation of the Bauhaus, with its system of Masters teaching 'apprentices' and 'journeymen' trades such as mural painting and weaving.

The title of Schwitters's book, Die Kathedrale, reflects the Expressionists' embrace of the Gothic cathedral as an emblem of unification in the arts. The white square of paper on the cover, part of a wraparound seal added by Schwitters, declares, "Beware: Anti-Dada."

== Constructivism: the move to periodicals ==
Schwitters' style became more constructivist after this, under the influence of El Lissitzky and De Stijl, the Dutch group co-founded by Theo van Doesburg, who was to become a close friend and collaborator. A memoir about Anna Blume (Anna Blume's Lead Memoirs in Bleie. An Easy-to-Understand Method for Everyone of How To Learn Madness) was published in 1922 with a markedly cleaner cover in a constructivist style, and this was followed by a series of periodicals, still called Merz, which continued to publish Schwitters' work, within the context of the emerging International Modernism.
