= Kasimir Edschmid =

German writer (1890–1966)

- Born: 5 October 1890; Darmstadt, Germany
- Died: 31 August 1966 (aged 75); Scuol, Switzerland
- Occupation: Writer

Kasimir Edschmid, born Eduard Hermann Wilhelm Schmid (5 October 1890 in Darmstadt – 31 August 1966 in Vulpera (Switzerland)), was a German Expressionist writer. Together with Carl Gunschmann he was one of the founders of the Darmstädter Sezession in 1919. Later he turned to realism before adopting a more visionary style. He was a very prolific author, known especially for travel writing. His work was part of the literature event in the art competition at the 1928 Summer Olympics. In 1933 some of his books, including "Westdeutsche Fahrten", were among the works burnt by the Nazis. He spent the war in a remote mountain village in Bavaria, in innere Emigration (inner emigration). After the war he became a prominent figure in West Germany's literary establishment.

== Selected works ==
- Verse. Hymnen. Gesänge. Poems. 1911
- Bilder. Lyrische Projektionen. Poems. 1913
- Die sechs Mündungen. Novellas. 1915
- Das rasende Leben. Novellas. 1915
- Timur. Novellas. 1916
- Die Karlsreis. Short story. 1918
- Die Fürstin. Short story. 1918
- Stehe von Lichtern gestreichelt. Poems. 1919
- Über den Expressionismus in der Literatur und die neue Dichtung. Literary theory. 1919
- Die achatnen Kugeln. Novel. 1920
- Die doppelköpfige Nymphe. Aufsätze über die Literatur und die Gegenwart. Essays on literary theory.. 1920
- In memoriam Lisl Steinrück. 1920
- Kean. Drama. 1921
- Das Puppenbuch. Photographs of dolls by Erna Pinner and Lotte Pritzel with text by K. E.. 1921
- Frauen. Novellas. 1922
- Hamsun. Flaubert. Talks. 1922
- Die Amazone. Short story. 1922
- Das Bücher-Dekameron. Eine Zehn-Nächte-Tour durch die europäische Gesellschaft und Literatur. Literary talks. 1922
- Die Engel mit dem Spleen. 1923
- Zur Naturgeschichte der Antilopen. 1923
- Bullis und Pekingesen. Animal sketches. 1925
- Der Russen-Zoo. Animal sketches. 1926
- Basken. Stiere. Araber. Travel, with illustrations by Erna Pinner. 1927
- Die gespenstigen Abenteuer des Hofrat Brüstlein. Novel. Vienna 1927
- Das große Reisebuch: Von Stockholm bis Korsika, von Monte Carlo bis Assisi. Travel. 1927
- Luxus-Hunde. Animal sketches. 1927
- Die neue Frau. Short stories. 1927
- Sport um Gagaly. Novel with sporting theme. Zürich 1928
- Tiere. Mädchen und Antilopenjagd am Nil. Travel, with engravings by Erna Pinner. 1928.
- Afrika: Nackt und angezogen. Travel. 1929; reissued in 1951 with extensive re-working
- Geschichte von den Suaheli-Mädchen und den schwarzen Kriegern. Story, with lithographs by Erna Pinner. 1929
- Lord Byron. Roman einer Leidenschaft. Novel. Paul Zsolnay Verlag, 1929
- Jones und die Stiere (short story) in: Neue deutsche Erzähler Bd. 1. Max Brod and others. Paul Franke, Berlin o. J. 1930
- Exotische Tiergeschichten. Animal stories. 1930
- Hallo Welt. 16 short stories. Paul Zsolnay Verlag, 1930
- Feine Leute oder Die Großen dieser Erde. Novel. Paul Zsolnay Verlag, 1931
- Glanz und Elend Südamerikas. Travel. 1931
- Indianer. Travel, with lithographs by Erna Pinner. 1931
- Deutsches Schicksal. Politics. 1932
- Zauber und Größe des Mittelmeeres. Travel. 1932
- Im Spiegel des Rheins. Westdeutsche Fahrten. Travel. 1933
- Das Südreich. Roman der Germanenzüge. Historical novel. Paul Zsolnay Verlag, Berlin/Wien/Leipzig 1933
- Westdeutsche Fahrten. Travel sketches. Frankfurt am Main 1933
- Italien. Lorbeer. Leid und Ruhm. 1935 (first part of a five-part work about Italy [Italienschrift])
- Das Drama von Panama. History of Panama Canal. 1936
  - Lesseps – Das Drama von Panama. 1937.
- Der Liebesengel. Roman einer Leidenschaft. Novel. Paul Zsolnay Verlag, 1937
- Italien. Gärten. Männer und Geschicke. Travel. 1937 (Italienschrift Part II)
- Die Eifel. Shell map of the Eifel. Rhenania-Ossag Mineralölwerke 2'1937 (text by K.E.)
- Erika. Short story. Paul Zsolnay Verlag, 1938
- Italien. Inseln. Römer und Cäsaren. Travel. 1939 (Italienschrift Part III)
- Italien. Hirten. Helden und Jahrtausende. Societäts-Verlag, Frankfurt am Main 1941 (Italienschrift Part IV)
- Das gute Recht. Autobiographical novel. Kurt Desch, 1946
- Italienische Gesänge. Poems. Darmstadt 1947
- Bunte Erde. Travel. 1948
- Im Diamantental. Four short stories. 1948
- Schatzgräber. Short stories. 1948
- Italien. Seefahrt. Palmen und Unsterblichkeit. Travel. 1948 (Italienschrift Part V)
- Der Zauberfaden. Roman einer Industrie. Novel. Kurt Desch, 1949
- Wenn es Rosen sind, werden sie blühen. Novel about Georg Büchner. 1950. New edition 1966 under the title Georg Büchner. Eine deutsche Revolution. Filmed in 1981
- Der Bauchtanz. Exotic novellas. Kurt Desch, 1952
- Das Südreich. Historical novel. 1953
- Der Hauptmann und die Furt. Short story. 1953
- Der Marschall und die Gnade. Novel about Simón Bolívar. 1954
- Frühe Manifeste. Epochen des Expressionismus. Literary history. 1957
- Drei Häuser am Meer. Novel. Kurt Desch, 1958
- Drei Kronen für Rico. Novel about the Hohenstaufen. Bertelsmann, 1958
- Stürme und Stille am Mittelmeer: ein Rundblick. Travel. Ullstein, 1959
- Tagebuch 1958–1960. Diary. 1960
- Lebendiger Expressionismus. Auseinandersetzungen. Gestalten. Erinnerungen. Literary history. 1961
- Portraits und Denksteine. Essays. 1962
- Briefe der Expressionisten. Literary history. 1964
- Die frühen Erzählungen. Early short stories. 1965
- Whisky für Algerien?. Travel. 1965
- Italien. Landschaft. Geschichte. Kultur. Travel. 1968
