= Lionel Salter =

English pianist, broadcaster and musical administrator

Lionel Salter (8 September 1914 – 1 March 2000) was an English pianist, conductor, writer and administrator who had a long association with the British Broadcasting Corporation.

== Eductation and early career ==
Born in London, Salter was a distant descendant of Salomon Sulzer, the composer cantor, a contemporary of Beethoven and Schubert. He showed promise as a pianist from an early age, making his first professional appearance aged 12 and his first recording aged 14. He studied music and modern languages at St John's College, Cambridge from 1932 to 1936 under Edward Dent and harpsichord with Boris Ord, and then at the Royal College of Music, where he studied conducting with Constant Lambert and Malcolm Sargent and piano with Arthur Benjamin and the Bach specialist James Ching.

After a brief period working at Denham Studios (London Films) with Muir Mathieson (where he edited Arthur Bliss's score for Things to Come) he joined the BBC in 1936.

== Wartime ==
During the war Salter was involved in both educational and intelligence roles, and when his duties took him to Algiers he stepped in as chief guest conductor of the Radio France Symphony Orchestra, which was based there in 1943-44. The following year he returned to the BBC, becoming assistant conductor of the BBC Theatre Orchestra.

== BBC and other activities ==
In 1948 he became music supervisor of the BBC European Service and also took on special responsibility for the Third Programme (later BBC Radio 3). His colleagues at the BBC included Leo Black, William Glock, Peter Crossley-Holland, Hans Keller and Leo Wurmser.

By 1956 he was head of music production for BBC Television, where he furthered the broadcast of concerts, ballet and opera. He is credited with establishing many of the techniques still used in music programmes today.

Salter was also a regular recitalist (harpsichord and piano) and a writer and editor for many publications, including (from 1948) frequent contributions to Gramophone and as editor of the BBC Music Guides until 1975. He composed, arranged and conducted for radio, television and films (for instance The Divorce of Lady X (1938), adjudicated at festivals, lectured and broadcast, and made over 100 opera translations. He was the author of Going to a Concert (1950), Going to the Opera (1955) and The Musician and his World (1963), all of them best sellers. A visit to interview Pablo Casals in Prades was the initial impetus in 1954 for a 26 part radio series, The Heritage of Spain, prepared with Roberto Gerhard.

His final role at the BBC (1967-1974) was as Assistant Music Controller under William Glock (and from 1972 Robert Ponsonby).

== Personal life ==
Lionel Salter married Christine Fraser in 1939. There were three sons, including Graham Salter, a professional oboist. He retired in 1974. His wife died in 1998, and Salter died two years later of cancer, in Camden Town, London at the age of 85.
