= Reunion (Uhlman novel) =

1971 novella by Fred Uhlman

- First edition
- Author: Fred Uhlman
- Language: English
- Genre: Autobiographical novel
- Publisher: Adam Books
- Publication date: 1971
- Publication place: United Kingdom
- Pages: 74
- ISBN: 0900754028

Reunion (originally written in English) is a novella by Fred Uhlman, set in 1933 in Germany. The novella was first published in 1971 in an edition of 700, plus 50 hors commerce signed and numbered by the author. The Penguin edition includes the information that the novella was written in 1960 and was Uhlman's first work of fiction. Born in Stuttgart in 1901, the author worked as a lawyer in Germany, before fleeing the Nazis in 1933, moving to France, where he was a painter, then Spain, and by 1936 settled in the United Kingdom.

== Presentation ==
The book focuses on the impossible friendship between the narrator Hans Schwarz, son of a Jewish doctor, and Konradin von Hohenfels, a young aristocrat, during the rise of the Nazi regime (in 1932) in Stuttgart, Germany. It is a short book, yet divided into nineteen numbered chapters. The opening sentence of the book immediately draws readers in to know more: "He came into my life in February 1932 and never left it again." The name of this "he" does not come until the end of chapter 1 and the narrator's name is not revealed until the middle of chapter 2.

Hans and Konradin manage to become friends despite their differences. Hans invites his friend several times to his house and is surprised that Konradin does not do the same. Finally, Konradin invites Hans to his home, but each time without the presence of his parents. Hans, annoyed, asks for an explanation. That's when Konradin tells Hans that his mother hates Jews. Hitler's rise to power causes Konradin to abandon Hans. Hans' parents, who suspect the harassment suffered by their son in high school, decide to send him to the United States to live with his grandparents, where he studies law at Harvard University in Massachusetts and becomes a lawyer. His parents commit suicide as a result of Nazi persecution. He tries to forget the hell of his past.

Long after his studies, Hans receives a letter from Germany from Karl Alexander Gymnasium, his former high school, accompanied by a booklet containing a list with all the names of former students who died in the war. He recognizes the names of former students in his class but he does not want to look at the letter H for fear of finding the name of his friend Konradin. Just before throwing the booklet away, he decides to look at the H and discovers the name of his friend, and that is when one understands the true meaning of friendship found. Indeed, his friend Konradin was executed by the Nazis after his participation in the assassination attempt against Hitler on 20 July 1944.

== Reviews ==
The novella was reviewed in The Guardian in 2016 and recommended by Persephone Books in 2018.

== Adaptations ==
The director Jerry Schatzberg made a film adaptation, released in 1989, under the same title: Reunion.
