= Leo Wurmser =

Austrian pianist, repetiteur, conductor and composer, later active in Britain

Leo Russell Wurmser (8 October 1905 – 11 May 1967) was an Austrian pianist, conductor and composer who came to live and work in England after the Anschluss in 1938.

== Early career ==
Wurmser was born in Vienna of a Scottish mother and Jewish father. He studied piano, cello, and composition at the Vienna State Academy under Franz Schmidt. He began his musical career as a repetiteur and as the assistant conductor at the Dresden Opera House under Fritz Busch and Richard Strauss, and later at the Vienna State Opera (1933-1938) under conductors such as Clemens Krauss and Bruno Walter. In 1934 Thomas Beecham first invited him to come to London to act as chief coach at Covent Garden. The links forged then helped him secure a work permit once he was forced to emigrate to Britain in 1938 following the Nazi annexation of Austria - a very traumatic experience.

== Life and work in exile ==
From then on he worked in Britain variously as a performer (including piano duets with Walter Goehr), coach, singing teacher and conductor for various opera companies, also arranging music for the theatre, film and ballet. In 1940, like other émigré musicians who settled in Britain, he was interned in Prees Heath, Shropshire and at the Hutchinson Internment Camp on the Isle of Man. A fellow inmate there was Walter Zander, who described how Wurmser "withered" during his internment, coming close to a complete breakdown.

In 1947 he was living at Herringbone Cottage, Ickford, near Aylesbury. During this period he began working for the BBC in various capacities: as coach, accompanist, conductor and producer. He was assistant to Stanford Robinson, conductor of the BBC Theatre Orchestra. From 1947 he joined the BBC's opera unit at Yalding House, working there with Peter Crossley-Holland and Lionel Salter. He also worked at the BBC with Leo Black, William Glock and Hans Keller. In 1952 he was appointed conductor of the BBC Midland Light Orchestra in Birmingham following the departure of Gilbert Vinter for the newly formed BBC Concert Orchestra - but Vinter returned to the position after only a year. When Vinter left a second time in 1955 Wurmser continued with the orchestra as deputy conductor under Gerald Gentry. While in Birmingham his address was 7 Church Avenue, Moseley.

Wurmser also worked for the publishers Kalmus. He conducted several works by his teacher Franz Schmidt in Britain, including his Variations on a Theme of Beethoven with the BBC Midland, the oratorio The Book With Seven Seals and the Fourth Symphony. Wurmser remained in Britain until his death, aged 62, in 1967. At the end of his life his address was 13 Colville Place, London, W.l.

As a composer, his works included a Clarinet Quintet, premiered at Morley College in 1944. Its first broadcast performance was in 1977. He also composed a symphony (first performed posthumously in 1968), the Romantic Variations for orchestra, two string quartets, a string sextet and many songs, settings of both German and English poetry.
