= Diana Uhlman =

English art gallery administrator

- Born: 31 March 1912; South Kensington
- Died: 14 November 1999 (aged 87); Hereford
- Employer: Artists' International Association
- Spouse: Fred Uhlman
- Children: 2

Nancy Diana Joyce Uhlman born Hon. [Nancy] Diana Joyce Croft (31 March 1912 – 14 November 1999) was an English art gallery administrator for the Artists' International Association. She saved Croft Castle from demolition.

== Life ==
Uhlman was born in South Kensington in 1912. Her conservative parents were Nancy Beatrice née Borwick and the politician Henry Page Croft, first Baron Croft. Her maternal grandfather was Robert Hudson Borwick, first Baron Borwick. She was educated at St James's School in Malvern and she was "presented at court" after attending finishing schools in Paris and Florence. Her father was a war hero and leading xenophobic politician who in 1917 had been a co-founder of the National Party which opposed German influence.

She rebelled. She went out to meet the unemployed Jarrow Marchers when they arrived in London despite her parents' wishes. She then went on holiday where she met the people fighting against the fascists in Spain during the Spanish Civil War. In Tossa de Mar, a small fishing village on the Costa Brava, she met the German emigrant, lawyer and artist, Fred Uhlman. Her parents did not want her to marry the penniless artist but that is what she did. On 3 September 1936, Fred Uhlman landed in England with no money and unable to speak the language. Two months later, on 4 November 1936, he married Diana Croft against her parents' strongest wishes.

They set up home at 47 Downshire Hill, in London's Hampstead, and it became a meeting place for refugees and exiles who had been forced to flee their homeland. She was joint secretary of the Artists' Refugee Committee who arranged for European artists, like Oskar Kokoschka, to emigrate to the United Kingdom.

Nine months after the outbreak of the Second World War, her husband, with thousands of other enemy aliens, was, in June 1940, interned by the British Government, in Hutchinson Camp on the Isle of Man. Internees were only allowed to write two letters a week so she would write letters for him when requested. Their first child, Caroline, was born while he was interned. He was released six months later and they were reunited.

In 1947 she began to administer a gallery in Soho called the Artists' International Association. She was the gallery's secretary and it notably helped the artists Edward Ardizzone and David Gentleman. She continued in this role until 1957.

The ancestral home of the Croft family was Croft Castle and it had been bought back into the Croft family in 1923 by Katherine Croft. By the 1950s it was proposed that it should be demolished, as part of the general destruction of country houses in 20th-century Britain. Diana is credited with saving the castle and in 1957 it came under the care of the National Trust. Diana worked with her brother, Michael the second Baron Croft, when she founded the Croft Trust in 1960 to assist the castle. The trust continued with other members of the Croft family including her daughter and grandson. The trust has bought paintings including one by John Constable which have been lent to the National Trust for display in the castle.

Uhlman died in Hereford in 1999.
