= Erich Kahn =

German painter

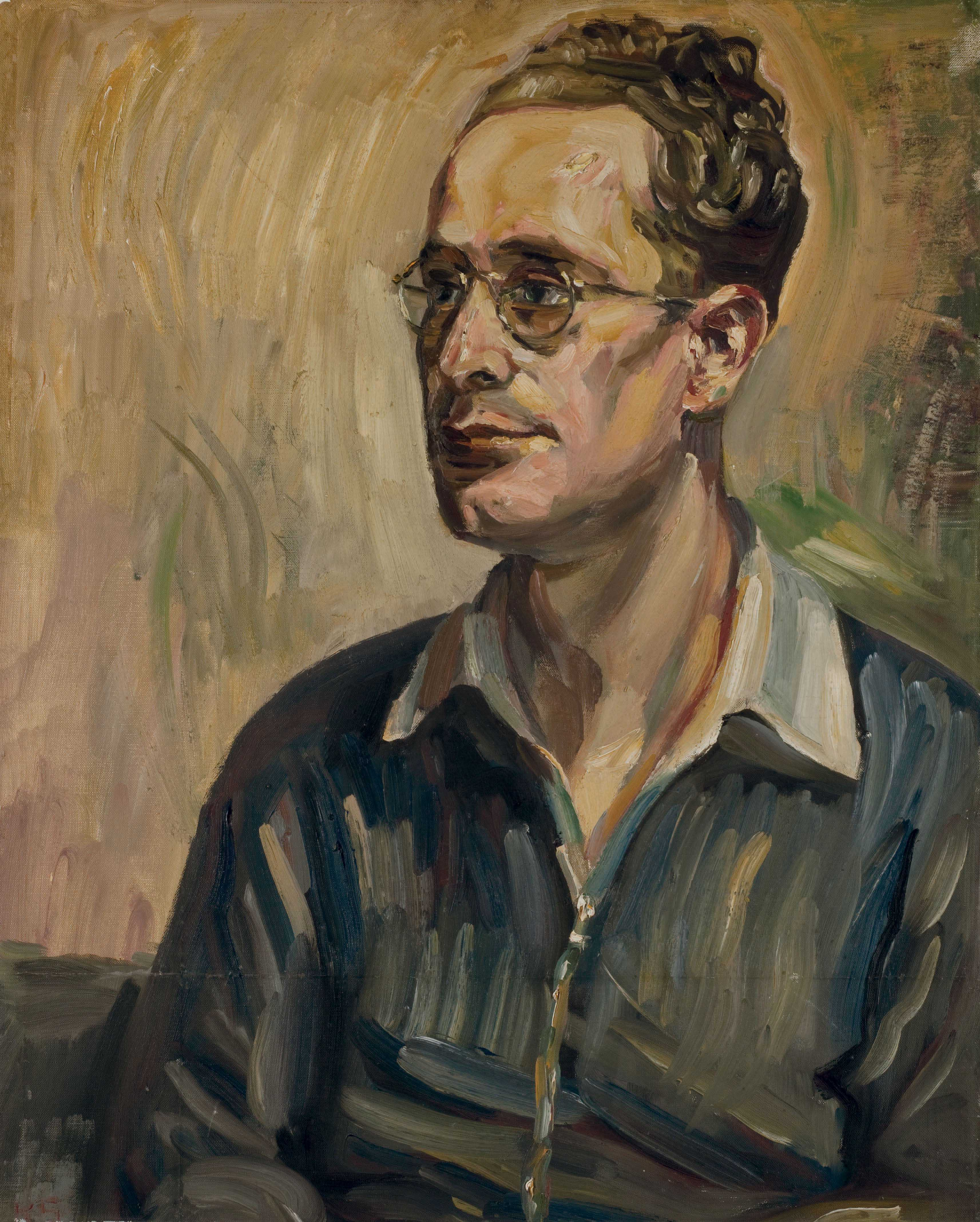
- Erich Kahn as painted by Kurt Schwitters
- Born: 1904; Stuttgart
- Died: 1971 (aged 66–67); London
- Education: State Academy of Fine Arts Stuttgart
- Known for: Painting
- Movement: Expressionism

Erich Kahn (1904–1979) was a German Expressionist, and a survivor of the Nazi persecution of Jews and Romani people during the events that led to World War II.

== Biography ==
Erich Kahn was born in Stuttgart in 1904 to a Jewish family. From 1921 to 1925, Erich Kahn pursued his studies at the State Academy of Fine Arts Stuttgart, focusing particularly on illustration and graphics under the guidance of Ernst Schneidler. Influenced by the Stuttgart Üecht group and a study trip to Paris in 1926, he developed a preference for a late expressionist style.

With the rise of the Nazi party to power in 1933, he found himself increasingly targeted for reprisals. During the November pogroms in 1938, he was detained and sent to the Welzheim protective custody camp, from which he was released on December 16, 1938. In July 1939, he successfully emigrated to Great Britain.

Following the commencement of the German western campaign in 1940, Kahn, like all enemy aliens, was interned in Great Britain. In July 1940, he arrived at Hutchinson Internment Camp, situated in Douglas on the Isle of Man, also known as the "Artists' Camp" due to the vibrant artistic and intellectual life of its internees. His circle of friends during this period included Kurt Schwitters, who made a portrait of him, as well as Paul Hamann and Klaus Hinrichsen. Kahn documented camp life through expressive drawings and graphics.

Released from the camp in February 1941, Kahn returned to London, where he actively participated in the Free German Cultural Association. In 1944, he held an exhibition at the Kulturbund premises alongside Igna Beth, René Graetz, and Dorothea Wüsten.

Despite enduring financial difficulties for an extended period, Kahn's artistic work took on an increasingly abstract character in the 1950s.

He died in London, at the age of 75.

== Work ==
Much of Kahn's work has been lost. The main reason being he belonged to what came to be known as the "Forgotten Generation" of German Jewish Expressionism-influenced artists born at the beginning of the 20th century, whose careers were hindered by the ascension of Nazism. Forced into exile to survive, they found themselves forever bereft of their identity, "caught between yesterday and tomorrow".

The Berardo Collection has acquired a large part of Erich Kahn's body of work, which testifies to the richness of a life that even surpasses the biography A Painter's Life and Time, written by Klaus E. Hinrichsen, an art historian who was his friend for many years.
