= Seer stone =

Seer stone may refer to:

- Seer stone (Latter Day Saints)
- Palantír, a crystal ball in Tolkien's legendarium

== See also ==
- The Seeing Stone, a 2000 novel by Kevin Crossley-Holland
- The Spiderwick Chronicles: The Seeing Stone, a 2003 novel by Tony DiTerlizzi and Holly Black
