= Joan Crossley-Holland =

English gallery owner and potter (1912–2005)

Joan Crossley-Holland MBE
- Born: Joan Mary Cowper; 3 April 1912; Peatling Magna, Lutterworth, Leicestershire, England
- Died: 12 January 2005 (aged 92); Bury St Edmunds, Suffolk, England
- Education: Wycombe Abbey; Central School of Arts and Crafts
- Occupations: Gallery owner; Potter
- Spouse: Peter Crossley-Holland (m. 1939; div. 1970)
- Children: 2
- Family: Kevin Crossley-Holland (son)

Joan Mary Crossley-Holland MBE (née Cowper; 3 April 1912 – 12 January 2005) was an English gallery owner and potter. Educated at the Central School of Arts and Crafts, she began a career in pottery at Royal Doulton. She took a break from work to raise her children. Therefore, Crossley-Holland was employed as a personal assistant to the Maharana of Mewar at the Lake Palace Hotel for a year. She was appointed director of Oxford's Bear Lane Gallery in 1966 but left to establish the independent Oxford Gallery in 1968 after disagreements with trustees over whether pottery was considered art. Crossley-Holland oversaw 186 exhibitions from artists by the time she retired in 1986.

== Early life ==
Crossley-Holland was born Joan Cowper at Peatling Magna, Lutterworth, Leicestershire on 3 April 1912, to the medical doctor Claude Marriott Lovell Cowper and the nurse and amateur artist Mary Bourne, née Collard. An only child, she was raised in Leicestershire and Buckinghamshire, where her father practiced his profession in Leighton Buzzard. Crossley-Holland was first taught at Plymouth Brethren Boys' School, Northfield, where she captained the first XI football team. She was later educated at Wycombe Abbey, where she learnt pottery and science. From 1931 to 1934, Crossley-Holland attended London's Central School of Arts and Crafts, taking a course in pottery. Studying opposite Dora Billington, the course gave her a life long fascination of pottery, and according to Geoffrey Findlay of The Guardian, contributed "to the general revival of the arts and crafts movement in Britain in those interwar years."

== Career ==
Following the completion of her course at the Central School of Arts and Crafts, Crossley-Holland went back to Leicestershire to do her own pottery work in an independent studio. In 1936, she was offered employment as a designer at Royal Doulton in Lambeth, where she remained until 1939, where she made full-bodied rough textured pots that were praised by connoisseurs for its "simplicity and modernity", and exhibited at Heal's and Liberty and Peter Jones. When the Second World War broke out, Crossley-Holland resigned her career to become a housewife after she got married and raised her children for the following two decades in Buckinghamshire and later Hampstead. She also worked for the Social Survey.

Through a mutual friend in the early 1960s, Crossley-Holland was offered the opportunity to work as a personal assistant to the Maharana of Mewar at the Lake Palace Hotel, Udaipur for a year. She returned to the United Kingdom in the mid-1960s, and was appointed director of the Arts Council-sponsored Bear Lane Gallery, Oxford in 1966. Crossley-Holland often disagreed with the gallery's trustees if pottery was considered art when she argued an exhibition of craftsmanship would be best suited to fill a gap in their schedule. With the intention of "if you can't join them, beat them", after she was given the response "What? Not casseroles?" by the trustees, she obtained the financial backing of 29 personal friends as shareholders and set-up the Oxford Gallery on High Street, Oxford in 1968.

As one of the first specially commercial craft and art galleries for this purpose, the Oxford Gallery under Crossley-Holland's leadership hosted 187 exhibitions involving more than 2,000 artists at the rate of one every five weeks with works of fine art such as prints, glass, pottery, engraving, jewellery, wall-hanging and the occasional painting put on display. She was one of the first to put on exhibits of John Makepeace's furniture, Lucie Rie's and Hans Coper's pottery, Wendy Ramshaw's jewellery and Peter Collingwood's weaving. Throughout the 1970s and earliy 1980s, Crossley-Holland was in a partnership with the Bradford Print Biennale, and received enough capital from garden exhibitions designed by Harold Peto in the High Walls in Headington in 1984 and 1985. She retired from the Oxford Gallery in 1986 and moved to Walsham le Willows, Suffolk. A special indoor/outdoor exhibition in honour of Crossley-Holland ran at the Barbican Conservatory in early 1986.

== Personal life ==
From 10 September 1939 to 1970, she was married to the composer Peter Crossley-Holland. They had two children, Kevin Crossley-Holland, who became a children's author and poet, and Sally. In 1983, she received the OBE for "services to the arts", becoming the first independent art gallery owner to earn the award. She died from Alzheimer's disease at Pinford End House nursing home, Bury St Edmunds, Suffolk on 12 January 2005.

== Personality and legacy ==
Marina Vaizey described Crossley-Holland as "small, bustling, and determined, rather like a fictionalised version of an inspiring but at times overwhelming sixth-form teacher" who had an "old-fashioned" appearance. She also noted her "preference for subdued colours from sludge green to rust red" and for sporting "the unexpected piece of avant garde jewellery".

Upon her retirement, the director of the Crafts Council Victor Margie labelled her a "crusader and missionary", and spoke of her "dogged persistence of a remarkable woman who chose to dedicate her working life to a better understanding of the visual arts. She has earned the respect of those of us working in the crafts." The obituarist for The Independent said that Crossley-Holland and her colleagues "quite simply changed the map of craft in Britain in the second half of the 20th century".
