= Sweet Revenge (1976 film) =

1976 film

- Film poster
- Directed by: Jerry Schatzberg
- Written by: Marilyn Goldin; B. J. Perla; Jor Van Kline
- Produced by: B. J. Perla
- Starring: Stockard Channing; Sam Waterston
- Cinematography: Vilmos Zsigmond
- Edited by: Richard Fetterman
- Music by: Paul Chihara
- Production company: Metro-Goldwyn-Mayer
- Distributed by: United Artists
- Release date: June 1976
- Running time: 90 minutes
- Country: United States
- Language: English

Sweet Revenge (also released as Dandy, the All American Girl) is a 1976 American crime film directed by Jerry Schatzberg. It was entered into the 1976 Cannes Film Festival. It was the second leading role for actress Stockard Channing in a film, following the previous year's The Fortune in which she co-starred opposite Jack Nicholson and Warren Beatty.

== Plot ==
Vurrla, also known as Dandy, is a car thief. As a public defender tries in vain to understand her, the only thing driving the young woman is to steal enough automobiles to make enough money to buy a Ferrari Dino, her dream car.

After being arrested, Vurrla fools her court-appointed lawyer, Le Clerq, into vouching for her character. He later learns that she's been arrested more than once, skips court appearances and is wanted by the law. Le Clerq is irresistibly fascinated by her, even after she abuses his trust and even makes him an unwitting accomplice in a shoplifting.

Using a scheme that involves various disguises, dialects and phony stories, Vurrla cons a number of innocent people by selling stolen vehicles to each, getting paid in cash. She betrays former boyfriend Andy in the process, causing him to be jailed and lash out at her. She also ends up costing childhood friend Edmund, another thief, his life during a police pursuit when his car plunges off a street ramp.

Finally unable to cajole her way out of trouble, Vurrla takes possession of her coveted Ferrari, goes for one fast ride in it, then sets it on fire. Presumably ready to surrender to authorities, she is asked by Le Clerq, her lawyer, "Was that absolutely necessary?"

== Cast ==
- Stockard Channing as Vurrla Kowsky
- Sam Waterston as Le Clerq
- Franklyn Ajaye as Edmund
- Jan D'Arcy as Linda
- Richard Daughty as Andy
- Norman Matlock as John
- Marvin Rosand as Policeman
- Robert Lewis-Ferguson as Policeman #2
- Betta St. George as Woman Guard
- Evan A. Lottman as Bailiff (as Evan Lottman)
- Adrian Sparks as D.A.
- Jock Dove as Judge
- Duncan Maclean
- Brooks Woolley as Ferrari Salesman
- Edmund Villa as Greg (as Ed E. Villa)
- Adele Burnett as Judge Adams

== Reception ==
MGM gave the film a very limited release with virtually no promotion. As a result, the film came and went very quickly and received few contemporary reviews. Vincent Canby did not review the film until June 26, 1981 in The New York Times, under the title Dandy, the All-American Girl. He wrote: "Dandy' is not exactly a failure, though it is easy to understand why it failed to find an audience." In critic Leonard Maltin's Movie Guide book of reviews, this film, as Sweet Revenge, is called a "turkey" and given his lowest possible rating, "BOMB."
