= Fred Uhlman =

German English writer

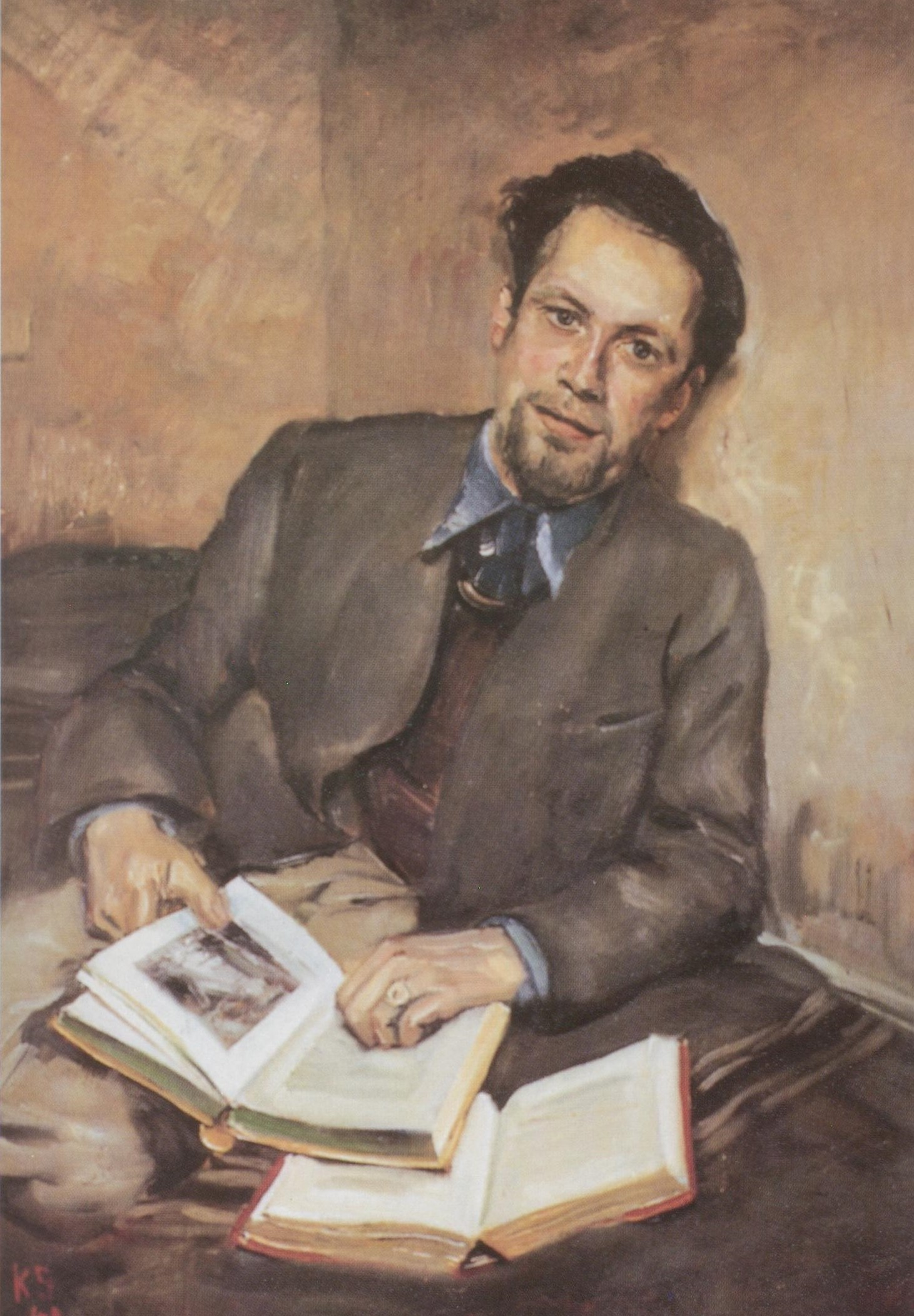
- Portrait of Fred Uhlman,1940
- Born: Manfred Uhlman; 19 January 1901; Stuttgart, Germany
- Died: 11 April 1985 (aged 84); London, England
- Spouse: Diana Croft
- Children: a daughter and a son

Fred Uhlman (19 January 1901 – 11 April 1985) was a German-English writer, painter and lawyer of Jewish origin.

== Biography ==
Fred Uhlman was born in Stuttgart, Germany, into a prosperous middle-class Jewish family. He studied at the University of Freiburg, the Ludwig-Maximilians-Universität München, and the University of Tübingen from where, in 1923, he graduated with a degree in Law followed by a Doctorate in Canon and Civil Law.

In March 1933, two months after Hitler was sworn in as Chancellor, Uhlman moved to Paris to start a new life; but, as long as he had been living in France, he encountered many difficulties; foreigners were not permitted to take paid employment, and were immediately expelled from France if caught doing so. Uhlman supported himself by drawing and painting, and selling his work privately when he could. At one stage he supplemented his income by selling tropical fish. Uhlman's star as a painter was in the ascendant, but buyers were hard to come by.

In April 1936 he moved to Tossa de Mar, a small fishing village on the Costa Brava in Spain, but shortly thereafter the Spanish Civil War broke out, and in August he decided to return to Paris, via Marseille. Here, while making a telephone call from a café to Diana Croft, a friend in London whom he had met in Tossa de Mar, his wallet, containing most of his money and his passport, was stolen from his jacket left unattended at his table. A foreigner in France without a passport effectively became a stateless person and subject to official harassment, internment and possible expulsion. Demoralised and in despair, he gave the café proprietor his Paris telephone number and continued his journey to Paris. The next day he received a telephone call at his hotel; the caller informed him that he had the wallet and passport and would mail them to Uhlman the next day, because he was a co-réligionnaire of Uhlman's, but would retain ten percent of the money in the wallet 'to cover expenses'. The wallet and passport arrived the following day. On 3 September 1936, Fred Uhlman landed in England with no money and unable to speak the language. Two months later, on 4 November 1936, he married Diana Croft, daughter of the right wing Henry Page Croft (later Lord Croft), against her parents' strongest wishes.

They set up home on Downshire Hill, in Hampstead, London, and it became a favourite cultural and artistic meeting place for the large group of refugees and exiles who, like Uhlman, had been forced to flee their homeland. He founded the Free German League of Culture, whose members included Oskar Kokoschka and Stefan Zweig, though he parted company with it when he felt it coming under Communist domination.

Nine months after the outbreak of the Second World War Uhlman, with thousands of other enemy aliens, was, in June 1940, interned by the British Government in Hutchinson Camp on the Isle of Man. Here he met the artist Kurt Schwitters, a fellow internee, who took his portrait. He was released six months later and reunited with his wife and with his daughter, Caroline, who was born while he was interned.

Uhlman had his first solo exhibition at the Galerie Le Niveau in Paris in 1935. In London, he exhibited at the Zwemmer Gallery in 1938, and from then on he exhibited regularly in one-man shows as well as mixed exhibitions throughout Britain. A retrospective exhibition of his work was held at the Leighton House Museum in London in 1968. His work is represented in many public galleries, including the Fitzwilliam Museum in Cambridge and the Victoria & Albert Museum in London.

Uhlman's memoirs, The Making of an Englishman, were published in 1960.

His novel Reunion was published in 1971. Virtually ignored when it was first published, it was re-published in 1977 to critical acclaim, drawing praise from Arthur Koestler, who wrote the introduction to this edition. Reunion is about the forces that end the friendship and childhood of Hans Schwarz, the son of a Jewish doctor in Nazi Germany, and Count Konradin von Hohenfels, an upper-class schoolmate with whom Hans becomes infatuated. The short, poetic narrative chronicles their intense, innocent friendship and concludes with a revelation that counters superficial judgements about human character.

When I first read Fred Uhlman's Reunion' some years ago, I wrote to the author (whom I only knew by reputation as a painter) and told him I considered it a minor masterpiece. The qualifying adjective needs perhaps a word of explanation. It was meant to refer to the small size of the book, and to the impression that although its theme was the ugliest tragedy in man's history, it was written in a nostalgic minor key.

– Arthur Koestler, Introduction to Reunion, 1976.

Uhlman became a collector of African sculpture, and was able to accumulate a large and important collection with modest expenditure. He donated his collection to the Hatton Gallery, Newcastle University, UK, the year before his death, where it is on permanent show.

Fred Uhlman died in London on 11 April 1985, survived by his wife and two children. He was buried in Yarpole in Herefordshire.

In 1989 the film Reunion, based on Fred Uhlman's novella, was directed by Jerry Schatzberg from a screenplay by Harold Pinter. Reunion has also been adapted for the stage by Ronan Wilmot and was premiered at the New Theatre in Dublin on 9 November 2010.

== Books by and about Fred Uhlman ==
- Captivity: twenty-four drawings by Fred Uhlman, London: Jonathan Cape, 1946.
- The Making of an Englishman, London: Victor Gollancz, 1960.
- Reunion, London: Adam Books, 1971. A print run of just 700 copies.
- Reunion, London: Collins & Harvill, 1977, a new edition with a glowing introduction by Arthur Koestler, who refers to the book as "a minor masterpiece".
- Reunion, New York: Farrar, Straus, Giroux, 1977 (identical to the above).
- Between the Lightning and the Moon. Fiction. Gerald Duckworth & Co. London: 1984.
- Anna Plodeck: The making of Fred Uhlman: life and work of the painter and writer in exile. [Dissertation, University of London (Courtauld Institute of Art), 2004]
- Czech Routes To Britain: Selected Czechoslovak artists in Britain from the Ben Uri and private collections, Ben Uri Gallery and Museum, 2019.
