= The Day the Ponies Come Back =

2000 film by Jerry Schatzberg

- French film poster
- Directed by: Jerry Schatzberg
- Written by: Bob Cea; Jerry Schatzberg
- Produced by: Alain Rocca
- Starring: Guillaume Canet; Burt Young
- Cinematography: Bruno de Keyzer
- Edited by: Sabine Hoffman
- Music by: John Hill
- Production companies: Lazennec Productions; River Quest Entertainment; TVA International
- Distributed by: Mondo Films
- Release date: August 27, 2000; (MWFF)
- Running time: 104 minutes
- Countries: France; United States
- Language: English

The Day the Ponies Come Back is a 2000 French/American drama film directed by Jerry Schatzberg.

== Synopsis ==
Brass instrument repairman Daniel Moulin goes to New York City for a business trip and takes the opportunity to try to find his father whom he never knew. The only clue in his possession is a 25-year-old piece of paper with an address in the Bronx.

== Cast ==
- Guillaume Canet as Daniel Moulin
- Burt Young as John Stoller
- Monica Trombetta as Tilly DeCruccio
- Nick Sandow as Joey
- Jay Rivera as William
- Tony Lo Bianco as Paul DeCruccio
- Norman Matlock as Cecil Perry
- Lawrence Hoffman as Cop 1
- Bob Cea as Cop #2 (as Robert Cea)
- Vincent D'Arbouze as Teen #1
- Francis Dumaurier as John in the Dumpster
- Ivan Hampden Jr. as Church Drummer
- Jamie Hector as Darryl Boyd
- Ebony Jo-Ann as Beatrice
- Marcia Jean Kurtz as Thelma
- Adriane Lenox as Reverend Grace
- P.J. Marshall as Jon #2
- Shabazz Ray as The Knife Guy (as Shabazz Richardson)
- Delissa Reynolds as Cece
- Francine Roussel as Marie Moulin
- Kevin Sibley as Craig
- Laundrea Thomas as Young Prostitute
- Cheryl Wills as News Reporter

== Release ==
The film premiered at the Montreal World Film Festival on August 27, 2000. It was later released in France on March 21, 2001.
