= At the Crossing Places =

2001 book by Kevin Crossley-Holland

- First edition
- Author: Kevin Crossley-Holland
- Genre: historical fantasy
- Publisher: Orion Publishing Group
- Publication date: 2001
- ISBN: 978-0-439-26599-7
- Preceded by: The Seeing Stone
- Followed by: King of the Middle March

At the Crossing Places is the second book in the Arthur trilogy by Kevin Crossley-Holland. It is a children's historical fantasy and an Arthurian legend, and recounts the story of the squire Arthur de Caldicot in the year 1200 after the events of The Seeing Stone. The book was also released in an audio format by Listening Library, consisting of six cassette tapes.

== Synopsis ==
Arthur is now fourteen-years-old, and has left his foster family to live with Lord Stephen de Holt as his squire in training, and is preparing to join him on the Fourth Crusade. It has also been revealed that his blood-father is his foster father's brother, mean-tempered Sir William, and his mother is still unknown, but Arthur is intent on finding her. Meanwhile, his plans to marry Grace are ruined, as she is his half-sister, so instead he wonders about courting Winnie de Verdon.

== Reception ==
Joanna Long wrote in her review for The Horn Book Magazine that this "volume is less dramatically intense than the first, and some of the crusaders ideas seem rather pacific and multicultural for their time, but Crossley-Holland once again evokes a rich and credible panoply of circumstances and characters". Sharon Rawlins of School Library Journal says the "book's length ... make for a challenging read ... and the action of the younger Arthur's life unfolds slowly ... but Crossley-Holland's writing is lively, and King Arthur fans won't be disappointed".

In her review of the novel for Booklist, Carolyn Phelan opines that readers of the first book won't be disappointed. She says the chapters are "short and satisfying", and overall the book is "fresh and dramatic". Kirkus Reviews said it is a "handsome volume with a spacious design", and also complimented the author for using page decorations based on 13th-century ornamental lettering.

Janice Del Negro wrote in her review for The Bulletin of the Center for Children's Books, that the author does a good job of interweaving the scenes of Arthur the squire and Arthur the king. She complimented Crossley-Holland for striking "an elegant balance between internal and external action; while Arthur grows in moral character there is plenty of action to keep the pages turning, from fires to murders to possible knighthood".

== Analysis ==
Connie Rockman, a children's literature consultant, wrote in Young Adult Library Services, that in order for a fantasy novel to be successful, "the setting and characters created ... must be believable". She says the titular character Arthur, has to deal with "emotional and spiritual yearnings, physical growth and maturation", and that Arthur comprehends that "evil must be fought within as well as without". She argues the fantasy novel is "not an escape" for the reader, but yet it "deepens their understanding of what it takes to become a mature and unique individual". She states that these types of books, like Crossley-Holland's trilogy, relay a message to the reader that is "subtle but clear":

- Life is difficult.
- Evil exists in the hearts of some, and its seeds are in each of us.
- Hatred is a terrible emotion and feeds on itself.
- Jealousy is poisonous.
- Cooperation wins battles of all kinds.

Rockman goes on to say that young readers will get "how complex Arthur's growth must be", and that if you are "kind and caring", and "listen to wise elders", like Arthur does, they will "point you in the right direction" in order for you to overcome the "evil forces both without and within".

== See also ==
- Historicity of King Arthur
- List of Arthurian characters
- List of works based on Arthurian legends
- Lists of fantasy novels
