= Kevin Crossley-Holland =

English translator, children's author and poet (born 1941)

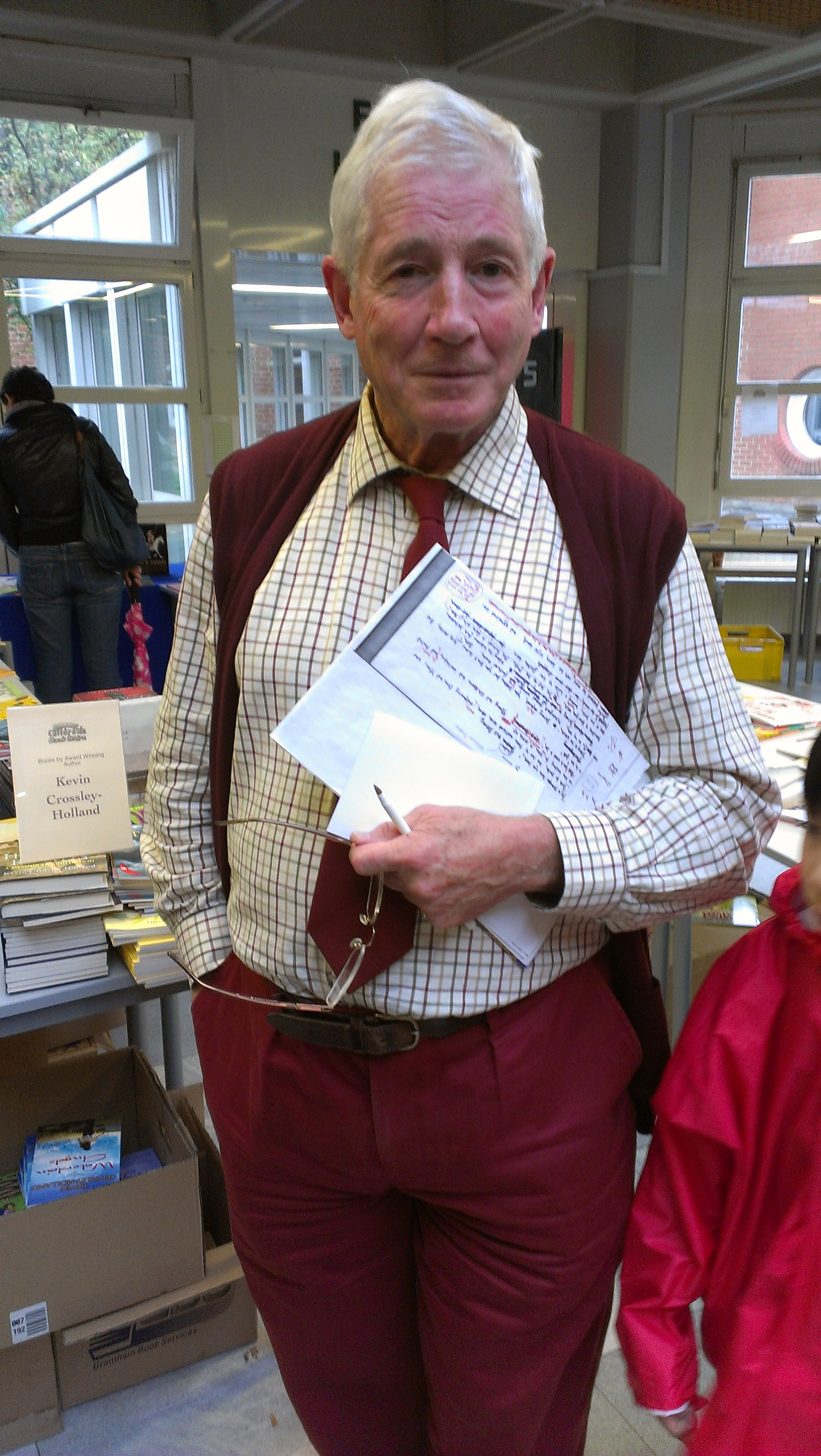
- Crossley-Holland in 2012
- Born: 7 February 1941 (age 85); Mursley, Buckinghamshire, England
- Education: St Edmund Hall, Oxford
- Occupations: Translator, poet, author
- Writing career
- Genre: Fiction
- Notable work: Arthur Trilogy
- Website: kevincrossley-holland.com

Kevin John William Crossley-Holland (born 7 February 1941) is an English translator, children's author and poet. His best known work is probably the Arthur trilogy (2000–2003), for which he won the Guardian Children's Fiction Prize and other recognition.

Crossley-Holland won the annual Carnegie Medal for his 1985 novella Storm. For the 70th anniversary of the Medal in 2007 it was named one of the top ten winning works.

== Life and career ==
Kevin Crossley-Holland was born in Mursley, north Buckinghamshire. He grew up in Whiteleaf, a village in the Chilterns. His father was Peter Crossley-Holland, a composer and ethnomusicologist; his mother was the potter and gallerist Joan Crossley-Holland (née Cowper). He attended Bryanston School in Dorset, followed by St Edmund Hall, Oxford, where after failing his first exams he discovered a passion for Anglo-Saxon literature. After graduating he became the Gregory Fellow in Poetry at the University of Leeds and from 1972 to 1977 he lectured in Anglo-Saxon for the Tufts University London programme. He taught in the midwestern United States as a Fulbright Visiting Scholar at St. Olaf College, and held an Endowed Chair in Humanities and Fine Arts at the University of St. Thomas, Minnesota.

Crossley-Holland's writing career began when he became a poetry, fiction, and children's book editor for Macmillan. He was later editorial director for Victor Gollancz. He is known for poetry, novels, story collections, and translations, including three editions of the Anglo-Saxon classic Beowulf in 1968 1973, and 1999.

Grendel reaches Heorot: Beowulf 710–714
Old English verse

Ðá cóm of móre | under misthleoþum
Grendel gongan· | godes yrre bær·
mynte se mánscaða | manna cynnes
sumne besyrwan | in sele þám héan·

Crossley-Holland, 1968

Then, under night's shroud,
Grendel walked down from the moors. He shouldered God's anger.
The evil plunderer intended to ensnare
one of the race of men in the high hall.

Some of his books, including the Arthur trilogy, reinterpret medieval legends. He writes collections of Norse myths (The Penguin Book of Norse Myths) and British and Irish folk tales (The Magic Lands: Folk Tales of Britain and Ireland). Bracelet of Bones, a Viking "saga", was published in 2011, as was The Mountains of Norfolk: New and Selected Poems. He has edited and translated the riddles included in the Anglo-Saxon Exeter Book.

Crossley-Holland has written the libretti for two operas by Nicola LeFanu, The Green Children (1966) and The Wildman (1976), and for a chamber opera about Nelson, Haydn, and Emma Hamilton. He has collaborated several times with the composers Arthur Bliss and William Mathias and has written a stage play, The Wuffings (1999).

Crossley-Holland lives on the North Norfolk coast, where he spent some of his childhood. His autobiography, The Hidden Roads: A Memoir of Childhood, was published in 2009. In 2012 he took up the honorary post of President of the School Library Association.

== Arthur trilogy ==
The Arthur trilogy comprises The Seeing Stone (2000), At the Crossing-Places (2001), and King of the Middle March (2003), published by Orion Children's Books in hardcover editions summing almost 1,100 pages. These have been published in 25 different languages and must be the author's best-known works.

Crossley-Holland takes a new look at the King Arthur legends, showing a medieval boy's development from a page to a squire and finally to a knight. Alongside this advance, the medieval Arthur faces issues such as his prospective betrothal and inheritance. Meanwhile, he has the "Seeing Stone" through which he observes the remarkably parallel early life of King Arthur, several hundred years before.

A follow-up to the trilogy was published in 2006, Gatty's Tale.

== Awards ==
Crossley-Holland was awarded the 1985 Carnegie Medal and 2007 "Anniversary Top Ten" recognition from British librarians for Storm (Heinemann, 1984).

He was elected a Fellow of the Royal Society of Literature in 1998.

For Arthur: The Seeing Stone he won the Guardian Children's Fiction Prize, a once-in-a-lifetime award judged by a panel of British children's writers and the Tir na n-Og Award from the Welsh Books Council. The two annual awards for young people's books recognise one fiction published in the U.K., written by an author who has not yet won it, and the best English-language book with "authentic Welsh background". The Seeing Stone was bronze runner-up for the Smarties Prize in age category 9–11 years and it made the 2000 Whitbread Awards shortlist.

Gatty's Tale was one of seven books on the 2008 Carnegie shortlist.

== Bibliography ==
=== Novels ===
The Arthur trilogy:

1. The Seeing Stone (2000)
2. At the Crossing Places (2001)
3. King of the Middle March (2003)

The Viking sagas:

- Bracelet of Bones (2011)
- Scramasax (2012)

Other novels:

- Gatty's Tale (2006), published in the US as Crossing to Paradise
- Waterslain Angels (2008)
- Heartsong (2015)
- Arthur, the Always King (2021)

=== Short fiction ===
- Storm (1985)

=== Collections ===
- The Penguin Book of Norse Myths (1980), published in the US as The Norse Myths
- The Dead Moon (1982)
- Tales from the Mabinogion (1984), with Margaret Jones and Gwyn Thomas
- The Old Stories: Folk Tales from East Anglia and the Fen Country (Colt Books, 1997)
- Outsiders (2005)
- Norse Myths: Tales of Odin, Thor and Loki (2017)
- Between Worlds: Folktales of Britain & Ireland (2018)
- Norse Tales: Stories from Across the Rainbow Bridge (2020), republished in 2021 as Across the Rainbow Bridge: Stories of Norse Gods and Humans

=== Poetry ===
- Selected Poems (2001)
- Moored Man: A Cycle of North Norfolk Poems (2006)
- The Breaking Hour (2015)
- Veering North-Easterly (2016)
- Seahenge: A Journey (2019)
- Gravity for Beginners (2021)
- Harald in Byzantium (2022)
- Spring (2025)

=== Non-fiction ===
- The Hidden Roads: A Memoir of Childhood (2010)

=== Translations ===
- Beowulf (1968)
- The Anglo-Saxon World: An Anthology (1982), includes Beowulf, The Battle of Maldon, The Dream of the Rood, The Wanderer and The Seafarer
