= Jerry Schatzberg =

American photographer and film director (born 1927)

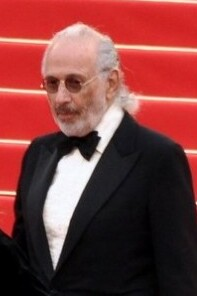
- Schatzberg at the 2011 Cannes Film Festival
- Born: Jerrold Schatzberg; June 26, 1927 (age 99); The Bronx, New York City, U.S.
- Occupations: Film director; photographer
- Website: http://www.jerryschatzberg.com/

Jerrold Schatzberg (born June 26, 1927) is an American photographer and film director. After establishing himself as a successful celebrity and fashion photographer, he transitioned to making feature films, as a part of the New Hollywood movement.

He is best known for his films The Panic in Needle Park (1971), for which he was nominated for the Palme d'Or at the 1971 Cannes Film Festival (and lead actress Kitty Winn won Best Actress); and Scarecrow (1973), which won the shared Palme d'Or at the 1973 Cannes Film Festival.

== Early life and education ==
Schatzberg was born to a Jewish family of furriers and grew up in the Bronx. His parents were not artistic, and he remarks that his only exposure to arts during his childhood was going to the movies with his father on weekends. When he was 13, his family moved to Rego Park, Queens, where he attended Forest Hills High School. He enlisted in the US Navy at the end of World War II, then continued after the war ended as a hospital corpsman for two years. After the Navy, he attended the University of Miami for a year before returning to New York City to work for his family's fur business.

His father expected him to take over his part of the family business, but Schatzberg had no interest. Instead, he started working for his uncle's diaper rental business. A promotion offered customers free pictures of their baby, and Schatzberg found himself in his first role as photographer, taking pictures of client's babies for two dollars a sitting. His first camera was a Rolleicord medium-format, twin-lens reflex camera.

== Photography career ==
Schatzberg began his photography career as an assistant to photographer William "Bill" Helburn. While working for Helburn, he enrolled in a photography course taught by designer and photographer Alexey Brodovich, whose other students included other prominent photographers Diane Arbus, Richard Avedon, Garry Winogrand, and others. At age 28 he left Helburn to start his own photography studio, moving into a space in a small, broken-down building kitty corner from Helburn's studio on 25th Street and Park Avenue South in Manhattan. Within a year, he was working for Vogue on assignments for editor-in-chief Alexander Liberman.

Throughout the 1950s and into the early 1960s, Schatzberg photographed for magazines such as Vogue, Esquire, Glamour, Town and Country, and McCalls. He photographed many of the top models of the time, including Anne St. Marie, Peggy Moffitt, Sara Thom, and Nico. Schatzberg developed and built his own signature lighting setup, which he used for many of his fashion photography sittings. He used fluorescent bulbs in large 4x8' banks, positioning two behind and two in front of the model, producing a pure white background with highlights wrapping around the subject.

In early 1959, Schatzberg was commissioned by a travel magazine to travel to Havana, Cuba to photograph Fidel Castro, just after the Cuban Revolution.

In 1962, Schatzberg was commissioned by Esquire to shoot "behind-the-scenes" at Yves Saint Laurent's debut show in Paris after leaving Dior. His photographs were a significant departure from his previous, more controlled sittings; here he took candid photographs of other photographers like Helmut Newton, Hiro, and Norman Parkinson during their sittings with various models, as well as editors Diana Vreeland and Jessica Daves mingling in the runway crowds.

Among Schatzberg's most famous photographs are the cover photo of the Bob Dylan album Blonde on Blonde, released in 1966, and the cover of The Rolling Stones single "Have You Seen Your Mother, Baby, Standing in the Shadow?" where the group is dressed in drag. Schatzberg also photographed many other musicians and celebrities throughout the 1960s, including The Beatles, Aretha Franklin, Andy Warhol, Edie Sedgwick, Diana Ross, Catherine Deneuve, Sharon Tate, and Faye Dunaway.

== Film career ==
One of Schatzberg's first film shoots was a short screen test of Edie Sedgwick in 1966, taken in his own studio.

He made his debut as a feature film director with 1970's Puzzle of a Downfall Child starring Faye Dunaway. Schatzberg worked with writer Carol Eastman, who based the script on recordings Schatzberg made during his friendship with model Anne St. Marie. Eastman also based the character of Aaron, a fashion photographer, on Schatzberg. Schatzberg and Dunaway were romantically involved before the film's production, but had split up by the time filming started.

He went on to direct The Panic in Needle Park starring Al Pacino in 1971. Schatzberg had seen Pacino on stage in a production of Israel Horovitz's The Indian Wants The Bronx and wanted him in the lead role, despite Fox Studios pushing for a younger actor. They ended up casting Pacino in his first lead role in a film.

He directed Scarecrow in 1973, starring Al Pacino and Gene Hackman. The film shared the grand prize at the 1973 Cannes Film Festival.

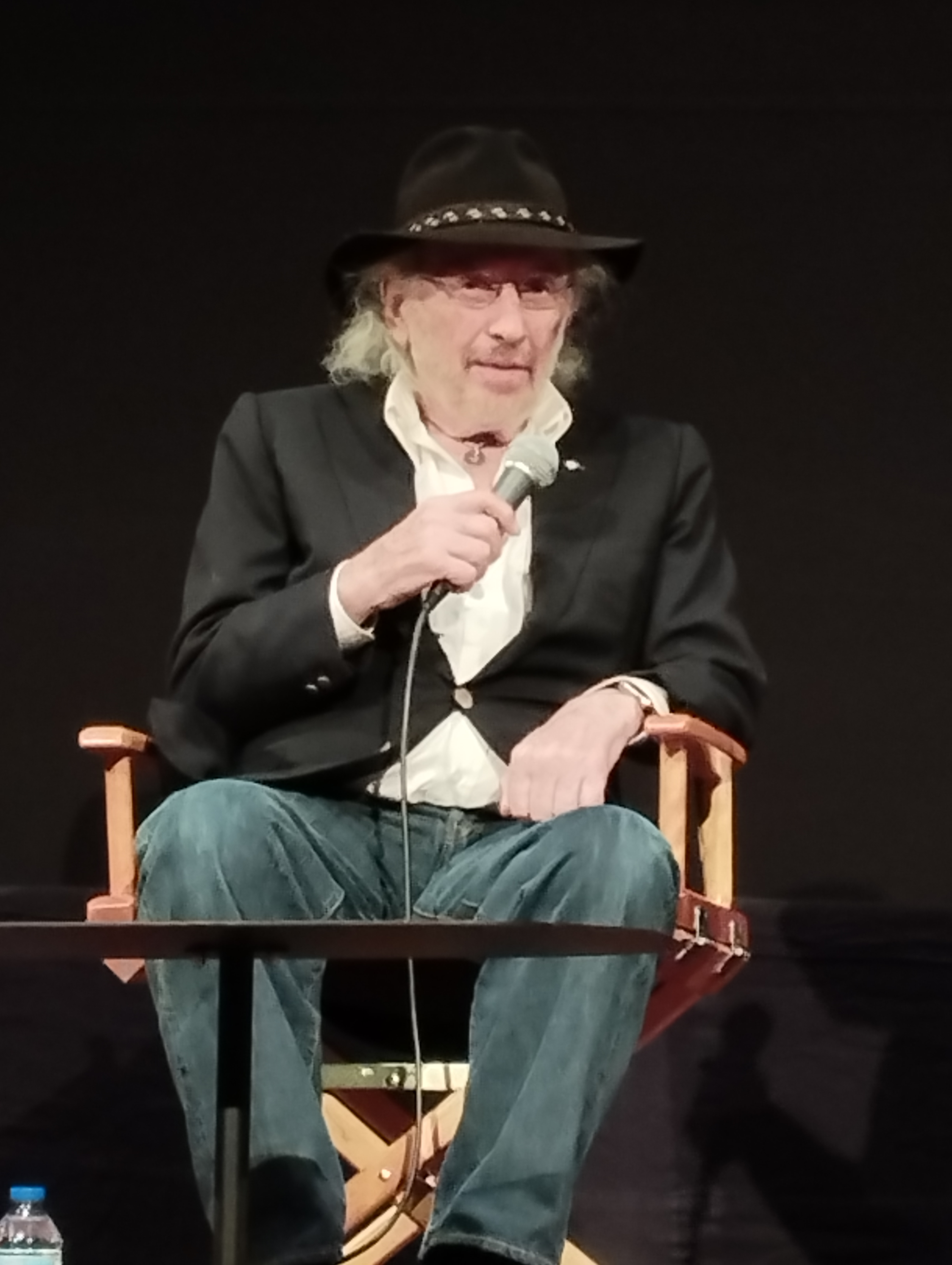
Schatzberg in 2023

Schatzberg went on to direct The Seduction of Joe Tynan with Alan Alda and Meryl Streep in 1979, Honeysuckle Rose with Willie Nelson and Dyan Cannon in 1980, Misunderstood (based on a novel by Florence Montgomery) starring Gene Hackman in 1984, No Small Affair starring Demi Moore in 1984, and Street Smart in 1987, which earned Morgan Freeman his first Oscar nomination.

In 1989, he directed Reunion, a drama based on a novel by Fred Uhlman with a screenplay by Harold Pinter. Though it was well received in France and was nominated for a Palme D'Or at the 1989 Cannes Film Festival, it received only a weekend-long release in the United States in 1991. With no home video or streaming release, it was virtually unseen until a restored version was given a two-week theatrical release by Rialto Pictures at the Film Forum in New York City in April 2026.

In 2000, he was signed to direct a remake of Fritz Lang's M (1931) for Film World, with Eric Roberts starring. No further updates emerged.

He was a member of the jury at the 2004 Cannes Film Festival.

In 2013, he was developing a Scarecrow sequel with writer Seth Cohen that was not made.

In 2021, Schatzberg revealed his intentions to make one last film, admitting that he "[doesn't] know what it is yet." He sought out and was considering adapting Atticus Lish's novel The War for Gloria.

== Personal life ==
Schatzberg married Corrine Loeb, his high-school sweetheart, at age 22. The couple had two children together. They divorced in 1968 following eleven years of separation.

At the time of the divorce, Schatzberg was engaged to Faye Dunaway. Dunaway left Schatzberg later that year for actor Marcello Mastroianni.

Schatzberg married French American actress Maureen Kerwin in 1983; they were divorced in 1998.

In the 1960's he co-owned the famous nightclub Ondine in New York City, named after his racing yacht. Opened in the mid-1960s and located on East 59th Street in Manhattan near the East River, the club hosted legendary early performances by rock bands like The Doors and Buffalo Springfield. The club was frequently visited by celebrities like Andy Warhol, Bob Dylan, and Jackie Kennedy. Later he opened another club, the Salvation.

== Filmography ==
=== Film ===
Year	Title	Notes
1970	Puzzle of a Downfall Child	Story co-written with screenwriter Adrian Joyce
1971	The Panic in Needle Park	
1973	Scarecrow	
1976	Sweet Revenge	Also producer
1979	The Seduction of Joe Tynan	
1980	Honeysuckle Rose	
1984	Misunderstood	
1984	No Small Affair	
1987	Street Smart	
1989	Reunion	
1995	Lumière and Company	Documentary
2000	The Day the Ponies Come Back	Co-written with Bob Cea

=== Television ===
Year(s)	Title	Episode	Notes
1988	Clinton and Nadine		TV film
1993	L'encyclopédie audio-visuelle	"Ben Gurion"	

== Awards and nominations ==
Institution	Year	Category	Work	Result
Bodil Awards	1974	Best English Language Film	Scarecrow	Won
Cannes Film Festival	1971	Palme d'Or	The Panic in Needle Park	Nominated
Cannes Film Festival	1973	Palme d'Or	Scarecrow	Won
Cannes Film Festival	1973	OCIC Award	Scarecrow	Won
Cannes Film Festival	1976	Palme d'Or	Sweet Revenge	Nominated
Cannes Film Festival	1989	Palme d'Or	Reunion	Nominated
David di Donatello	1990	Best International Film	Reunion	Nominated
International Istanbul Film Festival	1999	Lifetime Achievement Award	—N/a	Won
Montreal World Film Festival	2000	Grand Prix des Amériques	The Day the Ponies Come Back	Nominated
Kinema Junpo Awards	1974	Best Foreign Language Film	Scarecrow	Won

== Books ==
- Schatzberg, de la photo au cinema. Michel Ciment & Jerry Schatzberg. Chêne/Hachette, 1982. ISBN 2851083120
- Thin Wild Mercury: Touching Dylan's Edge. Jerry Schatzberg. Genesis Publications, 2006. ISBN 0904351998
- Paris, 1962: Yves Saint Laurent and Christian Dior, the Early Collections. Jerry Schatzberg & Julia Morton. Rizzoli, 2008. ISBN 0847831280
- Women Then: 1954-1969. Jerry Schatzberg & Julia Morton. Rizzoli, 2010.
- Dylan By Schatzberg. Jerry Schatzberg & Jonathan Lethem. ACC Art Books, 2018. ISBN 9781851498932
