= Reunion (1989 film) =

- Poster for Reunion 1989
- Directed by: Jerry Schatzberg
- Screenplay by: Harold Pinter
- Based on: the novel by Fred Uhlman
- Produced by: Anne Francois
- Starring: Jason Robards; Samuel West; Christien Anholt; Françoise Fabian
- Cinematography: Bruno De Keyzer
- Edited by: Martine Barraque
- Music by: Philippe Sarde
- Distributed by: Rank Film Distributors Ltd
- Release date: 6 July 1989 (UK release)
- Running time: 110 minutes
- Countries: United Kingdom; France; West Germany
- Language: English

Reunion is a 1989 British drama film based on the 1971 novel of the same name by Fred Uhlman, directed by Jerry Schatzberg from a screenplay by Harold Pinter. It stars Jason Robards. The film was released in France under the title L' Ami Retrouvé and in Germany as Der wiedergefundene Freund.

The story is centred on the "enchanted friendship" of two teenagers in 1933 English-speaking Germany. Hans Strauss (Christien Anholt) is the son of a Jewish doctor and Konradin von Lohenburg (Samuel West) is from an aristocratic family. The background is the rise of Nazism. Jason Robards plays the older Hans in the 1970s as he prepares to travel to Germany for the first time since the 1930s. The film was shot on location in Berlin, New York and Stuttgart. Reunion was nominated for a Golden Palm at the 1989 Cannes Film Festival.

A restored version of the film was given a two-week theatrical release by Rialto Pictures in April 2026 at the Film Forum in New York City.

== Plot ==
American lawyer Henry Strauss (Robards) is preparing to return to Germany for the first time since he left in 1933 following Adolf Hitler's rise to power. He is seeking to renew an "enchanting friendship" of his youth with aristocrat Konradin Von Lohenburg (West).

Strauss was the son of a Jewish doctor and the friends did not see that around them the rise of Nazism would lead to their separation. Their travels together and philosophical discussions against the elegant background of 1930s Stuttgart form the main part of the film, told in flashback.

The older Henry's search for his childhood friend leads to a startling revelation as he discovers what became of Konradin after Hitler took power.

== Cast ==
- Jason Robards as Henry (formerly Hans) Strauss, as an old man
- Christien Anholt as Hans Strauss, as a young man
- Samuel West as Count Konradin von Lohenburg
- Françoise Fabian as Countess von Lohenburg, Konradin's mother
- Jacques Brunet as Count von Lohenburg, Konradin's father
- Bert Parnaby as Dr. Jakob Strauss, Hans' father
- Barbara Jefford as Frau Strauss, Hans' mother
- Shebah Ronay as Countess Gertrud, as a young woman
- Dorothea Alexander as Countess Gertrud, as an old woman
- Maureen Kerwin as Lisa, Henry's daughter
- Frank Baker - The Zionist
- Tim Barker as Zimmermann, a teacher
- Imke Barnstedt as Girl in Tax Building
- Gideon Boulting as Prince Hubertus
- Alan Bowyer as Bollacher
- Rupert Degas as Muller
- Robert Dietl - Gardener at Old Grafin's
- Nicholas Pandolfi as Reutter
- Roland Schäfer as Judge Freisler on TV

== Reception ==
=== Box Office ===
The film was a commercial hit in France, having premiered there at the 1989 Cannes Film Festival. However, it received only a limited long-weekend release in 1991 in the United States.

=== Critical ===
The film was well received by critics. Time Out said of the film: "This moving rendition of Fred Uhlman's novel, about boyhood friendship betrayed under the destructive momentum of Nazism, shows Schatzberg at his (albeit limited) best." "Harold Pinter's tight and unobtrusive script, [Alexandre] Trauner's fine production design and Philippe Sarde's muted but expressive score ensure a feeling of all-round professionalism." The New York Times said: "'Reunion' is gratifying in the small ways most familiar from public-television's depictions of English upper-class behavior. The offhanded elegance of its settings, and the attractive crispness of its schoolboy manners ("Oh, he just rants and raves, doesn't he?" one of the film's cavalier young characters says about Hitler) are a major part of its gently decorative appeal."

Channel 4 said: "Nothing in Schatzberg's filmography makes the heart leap, but this film - adapted by Pinter from an autobiographical novel by Ulman - stands out above the rest. It's a quietly decent film that takes place primarily (via a flashback) in the early 1930s."

Upon its 2026 theatrical re-release in New York City, Talya Zax reviewed the film for The Forward. Zax described it as "almost a perfect Holocaust movie for our times — because it chronicles a moment much like our own, in which the gradual dissolution of society began to make itself known through the gradual dissolution of personal relationships."
