= The Seeing Stone =

2000 historical novel for children or young adults, written by Kevin Crossley-Holland

Arthur: The Seeing Stone
- Front cover of first edition
- Author: Kevin Crossley-Holland
- Cover artist: Marc Adams
- Language: English
- Series: Arthur trilogy
- Genre: Children's historical fantasy
- Publisher: Orion Publishing Group
- Publication date: August 2000
- Publication place: United Kingdom
- Media type: Print (hardback and paperback), audiobook (tape and CD)
- Pages: 324 pp (first edition)
- ISBN: 1-85881-397-2
- OCLC: 44915913
- LC Class: PZ7.C88284 Sf 2001
- Followed by: At the Crossing-Places

The Seeing Stone, or Arthur: The Seeing Stone, is a historical novel for children or young adults, written by Kevin Crossley-Holland and published by Orion in 2000, the first book of the Arthur trilogy (2000 to 2003). Set primarily in the March of Wales during A.D. 1199 and 1200, it features a young boy named Arthur de Caldicot who observes a secondary story in the "Seeing Stone", the early life of legendary King Arthur. Crossley-Holland and The Seeing Stone won the annual Guardian Prize and Tir na n-Og Award.

The trilogy is a contemporary retelling of Arthurian legend, told by Arthur de Caldicot as a first-person narrative, where both the primary and secondary settings contribute to the retelling.

== Plot ==
=== Plot in The Real World ===
The story begins in the year 1199, just before the beginning of the Fourth Crusade. Young Arthur de Caldicot, thirteen years of age at the time, is the second son of a knight living in Caldicot manor in the "Middle Marches" of the March of Wales. Most of the first book deals with the stresses associated with medieval life. Most important to Arthur is the fact that he is Sir John's second son, and thus ineligible to inherit land. To have a life of his own, he must become a squire and then a knight, and create his own manor and farmland. One challenge to overcome is his inadequate "yard-skills", especially jousting and swordplay. He is left-handed, considered a dangerous oddity in those days, but he must joust and fence with his off-hand. Another challenge is that his father would make him a scribe for his skill reading and writing. The obstacles disappear when he learns on his fourteenth birthday that his "uncle" Sir William de Gortanore is really his father; he becomes heir to a large manor. Unfortunately, it seems that his mother's husband was murdered by Sir William, who was jealous of him. And the revelation terminates the betrothal of Arthur and Grace, Sir William's daughter; as Grace is Arthur's half-sister they cannot marry. The novel ends with Arthur accepted as squire to the Lord of the Middle Marches, Stephen de Holt.

=== Plot in The Seeing Stone ===
The Seeing Stone (2006 paperback)

The wizard Merlin gives Arthur de Caldicot the "Seeing Stone" early in the story, along with the warning it will cease to work if anyone else shares in its knowledge. Through the stone Arthur observes the life of legendary King Arthur until his rise to power as King of Britain. It begins with the marriage of King Uther and Ygerna. They conceive a child, who is named Arthur and is taken by Merlin to a foster family. Years later, when King Uther dies, Arthur comes to be king. Many specific people look similar to or exactly like people in Arthur's life. The most notable resemblance is between Arthur and young King Arthur himself, which leads de Caldicot to suppose that Arthur in the stone is himself in the near future. This belief is only accentuated when he learns on his birthday that his parents are only foster parents, as for young King Arthur. Eventually it becomes clear that King Arthur inhabits a parallel universe, with events in both worlds reflecting each other.

== Awards ==
Crossley-Holland won the annual Guardian Children's Fiction Prize, a once-in-a-lifetime book award judged by a panel of British children's writers, recognising the best children's book by an author who has not yet won it. Exceptionally the 2001 Prize covered new publications during 21 months 2000–2001 as the schedule was re-aligned with the preceding school year rather than calendar year.

The Welsh Tir na n-Og Award recognised The Seeing Stone as the year's best English-language book for young people with "authentic Welsh background".

The Seeing Stone was bronze runner up for the Smarties Prize in ages category 9–11 years and it made the 2000 Whitbread Awards children's book shortlist. In 2001, it was a finalist for the Los Angeles Times Book Prize for Young Adult Literature.

== Series ==
The Arthur trilogy comprises The Seeing Stone and two sequels, summing about 1100 pages in their first editions (hardcover).

- The Seeing Stone. Orion. August 2000. ISBN 1-85881-397-2.
- At the Crossing-Places. Orion. August 2001. ISBN 1-85881-398-0.
- King of the Middle March. Orion. October 2003. ISBN 1-84255-060-8.

In the UK, the first book was published in print and audio tape editions. A paperback edition followed in June 2001, and an audio CD in July 2003. There was another paperback edition in September 2006 with new cover art (see image).

Scholastic published the first US edition in 2001 under its imprint Arthur A. Levine Books. There were Danish, Finnish, German, Spanish, and Norwegian-language translations that year; Catalan, French, and Italian in 2002; Hebrew 2004, Serbian 2006, Romanian 2008.
