= Hutchinson Internment Camp =

World War II internment camp in Douglas, Isle of Man

Coordinates: 54°09′37″N 4°28′48″W

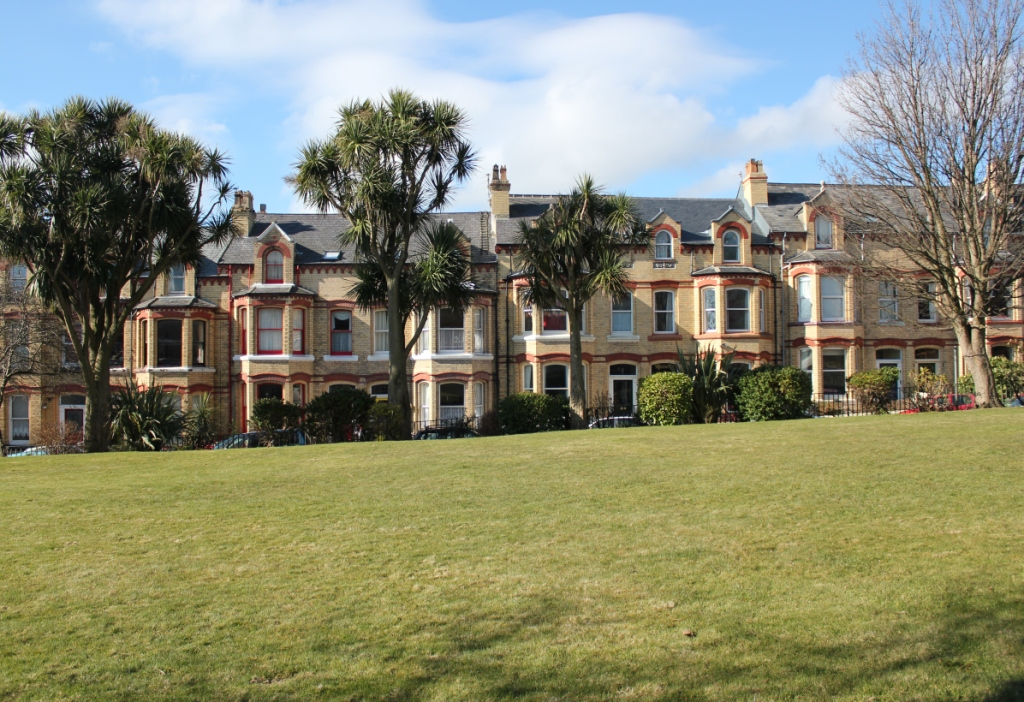
The houses on the South side of Hutchinson Square

Hutchinson Internment Camp was a World War II internment camp in Douglas, Isle of Man, particularly noted as "the artists' camp" due to the thriving artistic and intellectual life of its internees.

== Location and structure ==
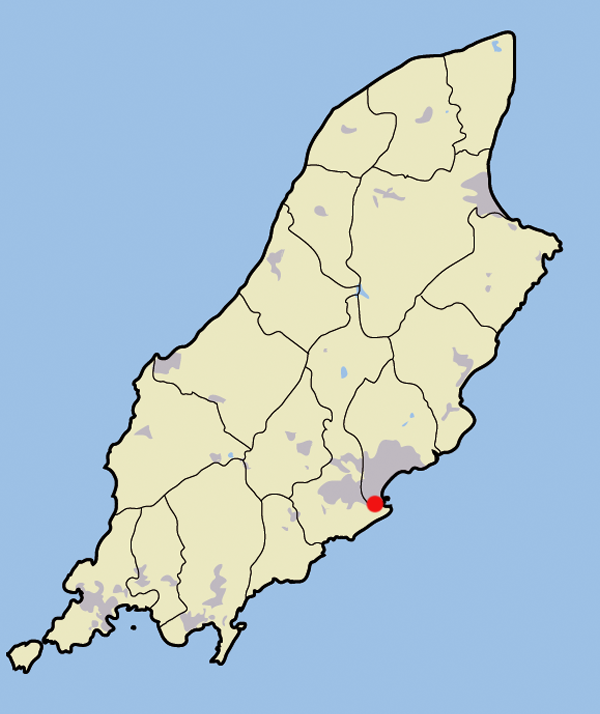
Douglas, Isle of Man, the location of Hutchinson Camp

The camp consisted of 39 houses around Hutchinson Square close to Broadway in Douglas on the Isle of Man. Because of the large number of people interned in the relatively small number of houses, internees were required to share beds. One of these houses, Arrandale, came to be used as the camp's sick bay. Major H. O. Daniel was in command of the camp until he was promoted elsewhere. He was a popular leader and was responsible for enabling much of the creative activities of the camp.

== History ==
Following the compulsory evictions of tenants in the properties and the erection of two barbed wire fences around the perimeter (in the manner of Mooragh Camp in Ramsey, opened in May), Hutchinson Camp opened in the second week of July 1940. It initially had only 415 internees but by the end of July this figure had risen to 1,205 internees, almost all of whom were German and Austrian.

Numbers fell from September 1940 when the internees who posed no threat to Britain began to be released. This was particularly marked in Hutchinson Camp, where there was an unusually high proportion of Jewish and anti-Nazi internees.

The camp closed during March 1944, when its 228 inmates transferred to Peveril Camp in Peel in order to clear Hutchinson Camp ready for use as a prisoner of war camp.

== Camp life ==
A collection of over 150 photos, taken c. 1940/1 mostly by Major H. O. Daniel, preserved by Klaus Hinrichsen and now freely accessible in the Tate Archive, gives a vivid impression of the Camp facilities, Camp life and art, and of individual internees.

=== Duties ===
The houses of the camp formed separate administrative units, wherein the internees took up positions such as of leader, kitchen staff, cleaners, orderlies and cooks. Although these positions were created along military lines by the British guard in charge, Hutchinson Camp was unique on the island in rejecting the military association by replacing the proposed "Camp Captain" title with that of "Camp Leader" or "Camp Father". The role of cook was sometimes taken up by professional chefs within the camp, when available. It was then the role of the other internees only to prepare the fresh local produce ready for cooking. It was through the locally sourced produce that the internees came to enjoy the local Manx speciality of kippers, which were known by some within the camp as "Yom Kippur".

=== Employment ===
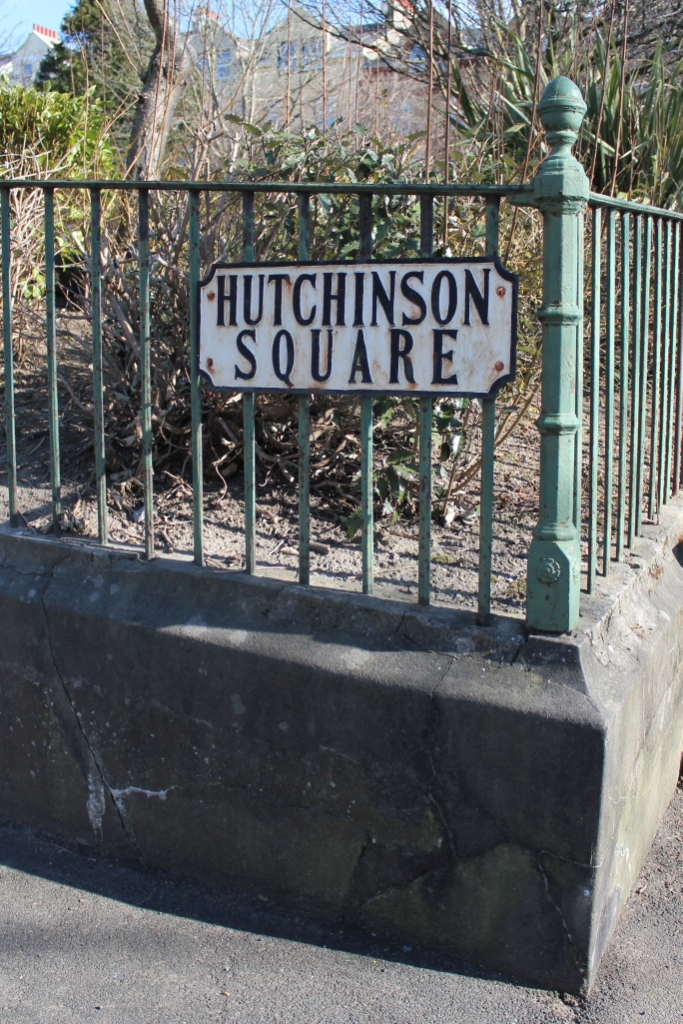
Hutchinson Square

After an initial period of official mistrust at the beginning of the war, internees were permitted to apply to work outside of the camp, predominantly on local farms. In addition to this the internees carried out professional activities within the camp, taking up again their professions from prior to internment. Besides the professions such as tailors and barbers, a notable case was of a Viennese baker who made cakes to be sold in the "artists' cafe" set up in a laundry room of one of the houses. Artists also charged for their works, offering portraits and other pieces at a price.

=== Sport ===
As was the case in the other camps on the island, internees often occupied themselves through sport. There was an inter-camp football league in which Hutchinson competed, though their games were generally played at Onchan Camp, which had a pitch inside the grounds. The internees were also permitted walks under guard outside of the camp and trips to Douglas Bay in order to swim. On such trips the guard gave special attention to one of the few British-born Italian internees, who had competed in the 1936 Berlin Olympics for Britain. He had brought his singlet with him to the island and wore it defiantly around the camp as a protest against his internment. Another sporting activity reported from within Hutchinson was the playing of boules on the green at the centre of the camp, although they had to use the brass balls from the camp's bedsteads for want of actual boules balls.

=== Morale ===
The internees gave a strong appearance of making the most of and even enjoying their internment in Hutchinson Camp. However, this was often just a show in order to hide their more basic sense of depression. Helmuth Weissenborn was to comment later that: "internment was a continuous torment." This feeling was created by a sense of frustration at being interned, helplessness with regards to the term of their internment and outrage at its injustice. The last of these points was particularly pointed for those internees, Jewish or otherwise, who had suffered in Nazi concentration camps before fleeing to Britain.

This latent depression was shown perhaps most clearly in the case of Kurt Schwitters. Many believed he was having a wonderful time, but in the privacy of his room he would reveal to his son his true sense of depression. Indeed, his mental state even brought out an epileptic condition which had not surfaced since his childhood:

For the outside world he always tried to put up a good show, but in the quietness of the room I shared with him [...], his painful disillusion was clearly revealed to me. [...] Kurt Schwitters worked with more concentration than ever during internment to stave off bitterness and hopelessness.

== Creative activities ==
=== University ===
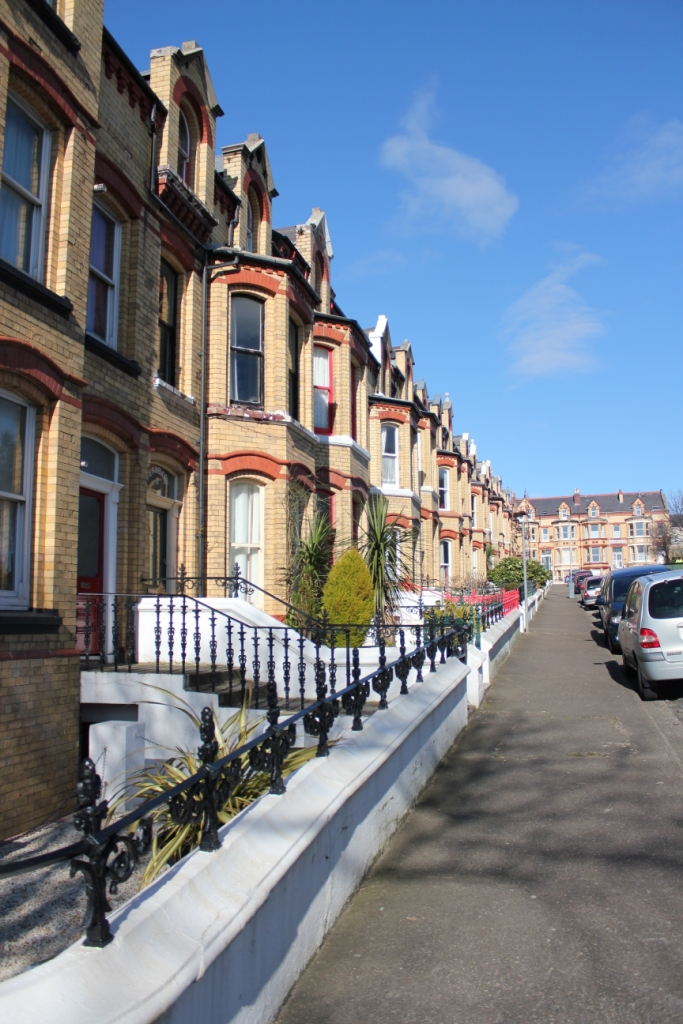
Street on the South side of Hutchinson Square

The camp was blessed with an abundance of academic and creative talent, which was only too willing to teach and learn in the camp environment where they had little else with which to fill their time. Within weeks of the camp opening, having already set up such institutions in their previous transit camps, the internees set up the camp 'university'. This operated in a building on the north side of the square, marked as 'lecture house' in a map of the camp published in an edition of The Camp. Lectures were also held on the lawn in good weather or in people's individual rooms for smaller classes.

The university utilised the talent of scientists, mathematicians, lawyers, philosophers, writers, artists, linguists and much else besides. This was in addition to the artists and musicians who offered lessons to individual students in their rooms or studios. To this list of the more formal lecturers can be added some other more unusual characters, such as:

a lion tamer who was unlucky to be born in Germany while the circus was over in that country. He was one of the first to be released, as his wife could not handle the lions by herself. [...] He always carried a small lasso and for a party trick he used to pick flowers with that lasso. His talks were always well attended as he had been out to Africa to capture the animals before actually training them.

The positive spirit of learning is well described by Fred Uhlman in his memoir:

Every evening one could see the same procession of hundreds of internees, each carrying his chair to one of the lectures, and the memory of all these men in pursuit of knowledge is one of the most moving and encouraging that I brought back from the strange microcosm in which I lived for so many months.

=== The Camp newspaper ===
Hutchinson Camp produced its own newspaper, The Camp. The paper was written in English by and for the internees. It contained reviews and stories, as well as editorial pieces and news from within and outside of the camp. Its first edition was printed on 21 September 1940. Despite the wealth of artistic talent present in the camp, the paper contained no illustrations, unlike the Onchan Pioneer which was produced in Onchan Camp further north around Douglas Bay.

There were other ad hoc publications of the work of internees. One example of this was Kurt Schwitters' short story, "The Flat and the Round Painter", which was published and distributed in an English translation made by a fellow internee within the camp.

=== Art ===
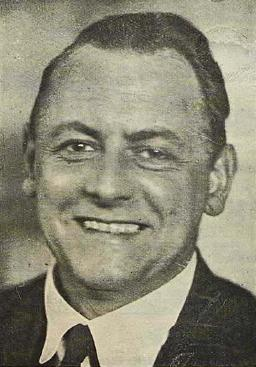
Kurt Schwitters, interned in Hutchinson Camp, 17 July 1940 to 21 November 1941

Hutchinson Camp was renowned for its thriving artistic life, not least because of its wealth of highly significant and renowned artists. The art created within the camp ranged across a wide variety of media and genres: figurative sculptures, new objectivity painting, Graphic art, Expressionism, Dadaism, Naïve art and engraving. Klaus Hinrichsen, who occupied the position of head of the cultural department within the camp, was later to comment that the camp represented nearly all of the styles that were being suppressed within the Third Reich at the time.

An art exhibition was held in a building within the camp within a month of its opening. The success of this led to a second exhibition taking place in November 1940, in which artists such as Kurt Schwitters displayed their work, often in the hope of them being sold for a relatively modest fee to other internees. This suggests the pace of artistic production by internees, with people such as Fred Uhlman, a self-taught naive artist, creating almost one piece of art a day. Kurt Schwitters, perhaps the most significant artist in the camp, produced over 200 works during his 16 months of internment, including more portraits than at any other time in his career.

This sort of creativity put pressure on the facilities of the camp and caused a drastic shortage of art supplies, at least in the early days of the camp. This led to much resourcefulness, such as: mixing brick dust with the oil from sardine cans in order to make paint, digging up clay when out on walks for sculpture, and ripping up the lino floors to make cuttings which they then pressed through the clothes mangle to create linocut prints. In addition to this there was a ravenous use of materials such as brown paper from parcels, government issue toilet paper, wall paper torn from the walls, and also the resultant blank spaces on the walls now ripe for murals. The engraver, Hellmuth Weissenborn, started a craze within the camp by engraving images in the dark blue paint on the windows, which had been put in place to act as air-raid blackouts in the absence of other materials at that stage of the war. The images created by Weissenborn and then others included landscapes, flowers and erotic depictions of women. Schwitters' extended the resourcefulness of the other internees by making sculptures in porridge:

The room stank. A musty, sour, indescribable stink which came from three Dada sculptures which he had created from porridge, no plaster of Paris being available. The porridge had developed mildew and the statues were covered with greenish hair and bluish excrements of an unknown type of bacteria.

Conditions were later made much more conducive to artists through the understanding attitude of the camp commandant, Major H.O. Daniel, who obtained a supply of materials for the internees as well as allocating some studio space to individuals such as Kurt Schwitters and Paul Harmann. It was in such spaces that the artists were able to take on students who benefited greatly from the close and intense contact they had with such leading artists.

=== Music ===
Major Daniel was also influential in encouraging music to flourish within the camp, as it was through him that instruments for the internees were obtained. A camp orchestra soon formed, led by Professor Kästner, reputedly a nephew of Thomas Mann. Works by composers such as Bach, Mozart, Schubert, Beethoven and Brahms were especially popular.

One of the most famous musicians in the camp was the concert pianist, Marjan Rawicz. Like other artists and musicians in the camp, Rawicz would give performances. There is a story that in preparation for one such concert Rawicz tried out each of the eleven pianos that were in the houses of Hutchinson Camp. Upon trying a particular one of them, the piano broke and literally fell apart. The piano was then leapt upon by the other inmates who "cannibalized" it for other purposes: artists took the wood for material to paint on, the metal strings were taken by the technical department for electrical wiring, and the ivory keys were taken by a dentist as material for false teeth.

=== Theatre and performance ===
Theatre also flourished in the camp, with productions taking place in whatever spaces were available. Reports exist of a production of John Steinbeck's Of Mice and Men being performed to twenty people tightly packed into a bedroom, and of skits such as a version of Shakespeare's Romeo and Juliet, but concerning a homosexual relationship between "Romeo and Julian".

The camp also saw performances of what is seen by many as one of the earliest examples of performance art, Kurt Schwitters' Ursonate, a pre-linguistic sound poem lasting up to forty minutes in performance. The piece proved sufficiently popular amongst some of the internees that its refrains were adopted for a time as greetings within the camp. Schwitters was also responsible for other Dadaist readings and performances, ranging from formal poetry readings through to his penchant for sleeping under his bed and of periodically barking like a dog.

== POW camp ==
After Hutchinson Camp closed as an internment camp in March 1944, it was then prepared to house prisoners of war. Preparation took a long time because the original furnishings of the houses were no longer to be used, but new furniture was to be created for the purpose, with the original furniture being moved out into storage. In addition to this, the barbed wire fencing was strengthened, watch towers were erected and the guard increased.

On 22 November 1944, around 5,000 German prisoners of war arrived on the island, many of whom were allocated to Hutchinson Camp. This was the first batch of many more for the camps on the Island, now collectively known as 171 POW Camp.

The prisoners had vacated the camp again by 4 August 1945. By 24 November, the tenants and owners of the houses in Hutchinson, Onchan and Mooragh camps had received notice that their property had been de-requisitioned and they were free to move back in.

== Prominent internees ==
- Bruno Ahrends, architect from Berlin
- Gerhard Bersu, prehistoric archaeologist and former director of the German Archaeological Institute at Frankfurt.
- Carl Ludwig Franck, architect from Berlin
- Hans G. Furth, psychology professor from Vienna
- Paul Hamann, Sculptor from Hamburg
- Klaus Hinrichsen, artist from Lübeck
- Erich Kahn, graphic artist and expressionist from Stuttgart
- Arthur Koestler, writer from Budapest
- Walter Landauer, pianist from Vienna
- Rudolf Olden, journalist from Stettin/Szczecin
- Marjan Rawicz, pianist from Poland
- Kurt Schwitters, artist (dadaist) from Hanover
- Fred Uhlman, writer and painter from Stuttgart
- Egon Wellesz, composer and musicologist from Austria
- Leo Wurmser, pianist and conductor from Austria
- Günther Zuntz, Classical Scholar from Berlin

== In popular culture ==
A lightly fictionalised version of Hutchinson features in the Scottish author Ali Smith's 2020 novel Summer, published by Penguin.

Hutchinson is the subject of the non-fiction book The Island of Extraordinary Captives by the British writer and journalist Simon Parkin. The book, which won the 2023 Wingate Prize, follows the story of the artist Peter Midgley RA (née Fleischmann), who was interned at the camp at the age of seventeen, and received training from the established artists, including Kurt Schwitters.

== See also ==
- Category: People interned in the Isle of Man during World War II
