= Kulturbund =

Kulturbund may refer to:

- Kulturbund (East Germany)
- Kulturbund (Yugoslavia)
- Jüdischer Kulturbund
