= William Glock =

British music critic and BBC administrator (1908–2000)

Sir William Frederick Glock, CBE (3 May 1908 – 28 June 2000) was a British music critic and musical administrator who was instrumental in introducing the Continental avant-garde, notably promoting the career of Pierre Boulez.

== Biography ==
Glock was born in on 3 May 1908, in London. He attended Christ's Hospital before reading history at Gonville and Caius College, Cambridge, where he was an organ scholar. He studied piano with Artur Schnabel in Berlin from 1930 to 1933.

Before becoming controller of music at the BBC in 1959, Glock had a career as a music critic. He was music critic of the Daily Telegraph in 1934, and then of The Observer (1934–1945). He served in the Royal Air Force during World War II. In 1949, he founded the music journal The Score, and served as its editor until 1961. He was music critic at the New Statesman, from 1958 to 1959.

Glock became the first director of the Bryanston Summer School of Music in 1948. On the encouragement of Schnabel, he founded the Dartington International Summer School in 1953, and was its director until 1979. The summer school put on performances of works by contemporary composers and courses for musicians. Notable participants included the Amadeus Quartet, Nadia Boulanger, Paul Hindemith, Igor Stravinsky, Boris Blacher and George Enescu.

William Glock served as BBC Controller of Music from 1959 to 1972. From 1960 to 1973, he was also Controller of The Proms, and took over personal single leadership of The Proms whereas formerly a committee had been in charge of them. During his tenure, Glock arranged performances and commissions of works by many contemporary composers, such as Arnold, Berio, Harrison Birtwistle, Boulez, Carter, Dallapiccola, Peter Maxwell Davies, Gerhard, Henze, Ligeti, Lutosławski, Lutyens, Maw, Messiaen, Nono, Stockhausen, and Tippett. Davies dedicated three works to Glock: Symphony No. 1 (1976), Unbroken Circle (1984) and Mishkenot (1988). In Proms programmes Glock expanded as well the presence of Early Music by composers such as Purcell, Cavalli, Monteverdi, Byrd, Palestrina, Dufay, Dunstaple and Machaut, as well as less-often performed works of Bach and Haydn.

A supporter of modernism, Glock was accused of discouraging performances of new music written in a traditional, tonal style. Petroc Trelawny noted, "Rumour has long had it that he held a 'blacklist' of banned composers; musicians who didn't fit his ideals. Arnold Bax, Aaron Copland, Edmund Rubbra and Karol Szymanowski loom large on this supposed list."

He served as Director of the Bath Festival from 1976 to 1984. In 1984, he was awarded an Honorary Degree (Doctor of Letters) by the University of Bath. He continued to curate concert series into his eighties, including a 1993 series of Franz Schubert concerts at the South Bank Centre. In 1994, one of the concerts in the Proms was programmed as a tribute to him.

In 1997, when invited by The Sunday Times to contribute to the partwork 1000 Makers of Music, Glock chose to write appraisals of his mentor and his protégé. Aged 22, Glock had been a pupil of the first, Artur Schnabel, who maintained that "the years 1919–24 were his most stimulating when composing and the search for a new individual language filled his thoughts". The second was composer and conductor Pierre Boulez. Glock wrote: “Remarkable is his compulsion to rewrite so many of his works, to make them richer and more striking... [However] during the past 20 years a second Boulez has adopted a more sensual language, yet without a moment's retreat from ceaseless invention."

Glock was married twice, first to the painter Clemency Davenport (née Hale) (1913–56), with whom he had a daughter, Oriel, who died in 1980. Following a divorce Glock wed Anne Geoffroy-Dechaume in 1952, who died in 1995.

Glock died in Brightwell-cum-Sotwell, Oxfordshire, on 28 June 2000.

== Honours ==
He was appointed a Commander of the Order of the British Empire (CBE) in 1964 and knighted in 1970 for his services to musical life.

== Bibliography ==
Glock published a memoir, Notes in Advance, in 1991.
