= Peter Crossley-Holland =

English musicologist and composer (1916–2002)

Peter Crossley-Holland

Peter Crossley-Holland (28 January 1916 – 27 April 2001) was a composer and ethnomusicologist. He wrote several books on the music of Tibetan Buddhism and composed music in ethnic styles including Celtic.

== Early life and education ==
Born in London, Crossley-Holland attended Abbotsholme School. Although he was a keen pianist, he studied medicine not music at St John's College, Oxford, when he matriculated in 1933. However, his composition "Fantasy Quintet" for piano and strings enjoyed a professional performance in Sheffield by George Linstead. Further his "Violin Sonata" and "Suite No. 1 for strings", both composed in 1938, won him a composition scholarship at the Royal College of Music, where he was taught by John Ireland. He later he returned to Oxford for a B. Mus. degree. His graduating piece was in the celtic style, "A Song of Saint Columba". He later studied privately with Mátyás Seiber, Edmund Rubbra and Julius Harrison.

== Career ==
From 1948, he was a producer for the BBC Radio classical music station Third Programme, until he moved to Germany from 1964 to 1966 where he was assistant director of the State Institute for Music Research in Berlin. After teaching assignments in Illinois and Hawaii universities, he was appointed Professor of Music (Ethnomusicology) at the University of California, Los Angeles (UCLA) in 1969. He retired in 1983 and moved to Wales.

== Compositions ==
In 1983, Robert Stevenson of UCLA listed 92 performed compositions by Crossley-Holland in Selected Reports in Ethnomusicology, Volume IV: Essays in Honour of Peter Crossley-Holland on his Sixty-Fifth Birthday:

- 1933–1937 (14 works)
- 1938–1943 (15)
- 1943–1947 (16)
- 1948–1960 (49)

After the publication of this Festschrift and his retirement from UCLA, he completed and performed an additional 16 works.

=== Selected works ===
Orchestral

- Suite for Strings (1939)
- Maguire’s Lamentation for strings (1944)
- Ulick, and Soracha, suite for chamber orchestra (1956)
- The Land Beyond for small orcheatra (1988)
- Symphonic Adventure (1989)
- Pilgrimage (1989, 2nd mvt. of the Symphony)
- The Golden Pathway (1990)
- Symphony (1994)

Chamber

- Romance for cello and piano (1937)
- Violin Sonata (1938)
- Trio for two violins and viola (1939)
- Trio for Flute, Oboe, and Viola (1940)
- A Little Suite for descant Recorder and piano (1957)
- Irish Tunes for descant and two treble recorders (1957)
- Albion for descant, treble, tenor (alto, bass) recorders and harpsichord (1959)
- Breton Tunes for descant recorder and piano (1960)
- Invocation at Midsummer for tenor recorder (1993)
- Tribute to Manannan for treble recorder (alto, bass) and piano (1999)

Keyboard

- Piano Sonata (1940)
- The Distant Isle for piano (1946)
- Introit for organ (1996)

Vocal

- Songs of Evening, song cycle (1941)
- Two Mystical Songs for baritone and orchestra (1945)
- The Sacred Dance, cantata for baritone, chorus and orchestra (1952)
- Six carols for sundry seasons for soloists and chorus (1952)
- Des Puys d’Amors, song-cycle for baritone and string orchestra (1956)
- The Visions of Saint Godric, cantata for soprano, alto, baritone, chorus, and orchestra (1959)
- Ubi caritas, anthem for chorus and organ (1995)
- Missa Brevis for chorus and organ (1997)
- Collected Songs (1998)

Dramatic

- Incidental music for five radio plays (1951–59)

=== Symphony in D ===
The Symphony in D was composed over the period 1988 to 1994. There are four named movements: 'Vision', 'Pilgrimage', 'In the Stream of Life' and 'Offering'. It has been recorded by the Royal Scottish National Orchestra, conducted by Martin Yates. Writing for AllMusic, James Leonard criticised it saying "...though well-composed and effectively orchestrated, lacks drive and cogency. Each movement rolls forward without going anywhere in particular..." Greenfield and Layton, writing in The Penguin Guide, note that "...the ideas unfolding inevitably and organically. The idiom is distinctly diatonic but there is a real sense of purpose. He writes well for the orchestra and always holds the listener." For MusicWeb International, Rob Barnett has described it as "a fine reflective symphony [which] ends with the confidence of serenity matched up against patent dramatics".

== Personal life ==
He married Joan Mary Cowper in 1939. They had two children, Kevin and Sally. He set some of his son's poems to music; his final work, the song "The Philosopher Bird" has words by his son Kevin and is dedicated to his daughter Sally. He and his wife were divorced in 1970. He subsequently married Dr. Nicole Crossley-Holland (née Marzac), a French medieval historian who taught at Aberystwyth University. He died in London of a heart attack on 27 April 2001, age 85.
